= Basic writing =

Basic writing, or developmental writing, is a subdiscipline of composition studies which focuses on the writing of students sometimes otherwise called "remedial" or "underprepared", usually freshman college students.

== Definition ==
Sometimes called "remedial" or "developmental" writing, basic writing (BW) was developed in the 1970s in response to open admissions policies. BW can refer to both a type of composition course and a field of study. The term "basic writing" was coined by Mina Shaughnessy, a pioneer in the field, to distinguish it from previous terms like "bonehead" or "remedial". BW courses are designed to teach formal written standard English to students deemed un(der)prepared for first-year composition. Despite documented concerns about the ability of multiple-choice and impromptu timed-writing examinations to predict performance on authentic writing tasks, institutions of higher education typically enroll students in BW courses based on standardized or placement test scores, with standards varying by institution.

In the early work of Mina Shaugnessy, BW is traditionally characterized by texts that demonstrates a lack of understanding of the rules of formal written English, specifically within the context of academic discourse, which may manifest as nonstandard syntax, grammar, spelling, punctuation, usage, mechanics, organization, and clarity. However, BW has shifted its focus from error correction to other composition interests, including the writing process, rhetoric, development, and diversity. Nonetheless, the curriculum is inconsistently designed and implemented.

BW as a field of study tends to resist narrowly defining basic writers. Shaughnessy characterized basic writers as "those that had been left so far behind the others in their formal education that they appeared to have little chance of catching up, students whose difficulty with the written language seemed of a different order from those of the other groups, as if they had come, you might say, from a different country, or at least through different schools, where even modest standards of high-school literacy had not been met." Students who are first-generation, non-traditional, English language learners, racial minorities, or members of disadvantaged socioeconomic groups have been more likely to be placed into basic writing courses, in part because writing assessments have privileged students' abilities to write using standard academic written English. In the mid-1980s, researchers Martinez and Martinez demonstrated that students characterized as basic writers are not basic thinker. Subsequent movements with writing studies have called for curriculum and instruction in basic writing courses that introduces students to the conventions and expectations of analytical and research writing tasks more like those in college credit writing courses.

Researchers in the field have advocated for the educational and socio-political status of students who are placed in basic writing courses. Deborah Mutnick asserts that basic writing "signifies struggles for inclusion, diversity and equal opportunity; debates over standards and linguistic hegemony." Theorists like Jerome Bruner and Lev Vygotsky have shaped more modern understandings of basic writing as sites where students are introduced to complex tasks that challenge them to develop previously unfamiliar cognitive and rhetorical tasks.

Since the mid-2000s, scholars from both writing studies, education, and other fields have sought to complicate the knowledge and practices of basic writing, calling into question the distinction between "basic" and "college-ready" writing and writers. Reform efforts in the last decade have blurred what once was a bold distinction between the two groups.

== History ==
Early versions of basic writing instruction in the United States started at Harvard between 1890 and 1910, when college enrollments nearly doubled. Modern basic writing originated in the 1970s when the City University of New York (CUNY) instituted an open admission policy for all New York City residents. In 1966, prior to open admissions, CUNY had instituted the SEEK program (Search for Education, Elevation, and Knowledge) which was designed as a pre-collegiate program that was meant to prepare students who were not yet ready to enter the university for full admission. As the open admissions policy caused college enrollments to nearly double at CUNY, Mina Shaughnessy headed the basic writing program to meet the demand for more writing instruction for under-prepared students. Since the late 1970s, many colleges and universities have created open admissions policies, and have in turn created BW programs across the country.

From its inception, basic writing has faced political and institutional opposition. Some saw open admissions as a way to overwhelm colleges with the "wrong kind of students", and others, including the famous editorial "Why Johnny Can't Write", criticized what they saw as the lowering standard of writing instruction. In 1976 CUNY cut the budget for the basic writing program and started charging tuition for open admissions students, measures that had dramatic negative effects on both students and educators in the basic writing program. Similar efforts to reduce or eliminate BW courses were revived in the 1990s and have continued to the present day.

== Major theorists ==
=== Mina P. Shaughnessy ===
Mina P. Shaughnessy is arguably the most prominent name in the field of BW. She helped create the atmosphere of academic respectability BW needed to become recognized as a legitimate scholarly field. Her 1977 book, Errors and Expectations, set the tone for much (if not all) of the BW scholarship that followed. BW scholars, whether they agree with Shaughnessy or not, are still responding to her. She resolutely held that such students could be taught how to effectively write. It is teachers of BW and not BW students that need to radically alter their views toward the teaching and learning of writing. In her 1976 speech, "Diving In: An Introduction to Basic Writing", she asserted that "teachers (need to) realize and accept the need to remediate themselves regarding the needs and learning styles of basic writers."

=== David Bartholomae ===
David Bartholomae was a professor of English and chair of the English Department at the University of Pittsburgh. Bartholomae's most-referenced publication about BW is the book chapter "Inventing the University", in which he unpacks the audience and purpose of writing for the academy, particularly from the perspective of students new to this discourse community. Bartholomae writes: "Every time a student sits down to write for us, he has to invent the university for the occasion--invent the university, that is, or a branch of it, like history or anthropology or economics or English. The student has to learn to speak our language, to speak as we do, to try on the peculiar ways of knowing, selecting, evaluating, reporting, concluding, and arguing that define the discourse of our community."

=== Mike Rose ===
Mike Rose was professor of social research methodology at UCLA, best known in the BW community for his part autobiographical, part pedagogically-philosophical book Lives on the Boundary. Rose's main interests in the study of thinking and learning included the "study of the factors – cognitive, linguistic, socio-historical, and cultural – that enhance or limit people's engagement with written language." As well as, "The development of pedagogies and materials to enhance critical reading and writing, particularly at the secondary and post-secondary level, and particularly with 'underprepared' or 'at risk' populations."

Additionally, Rose has argued for the term basic writing as opposed to the terms "developmental" or "remedial" which have the connotations of medical terminology.

=== Kelly Ritter ===
Kelly Ritter is professor and associate dean of curricula and academic policy and professor of English and writing studies in the College of Liberal Arts and Sciences and is best known for her historical work on basic writing in college. In her landmark book, Before Shaughnessy: Basic Writing at Yale and Harvard, 1920–1960, Ritter asks readers to reconceptualize the sorting phenomenon that frames basic writing as a course, phenomenon or identity that emerges with the notable work of Mina Shaughnessey actually reflects a much longer history of "social sorting" that has existed not just in open-access institutions but in the most selective of colleges. By examining the history of Yale students who were assigned to take courses—colloquially called the "Awkward Squad", Ritter aims to help scholars develop a "better, more historically informed schemata for first-year writing programs, one that is cognizant of the role that local values play in shaping definition."

== Reform efforts ==
Remedial education came under national scrutiny in the early 2000s as organizations like Achieving the Dream turned their attention to improving community college success rates. Reports from the Community College Research Center showed that under 50% of students entering developmental sequences completed them, with even fewer successfully completing the college-level gateway course. Complete College America's report "Remediation: Higher Education's Bridge to Nowhere" targeted each state in the US, showing data on success rates for two and four year colleges and advocating placement into college-level courses with co-requisite support.

Reform efforts nationally have taken the form of many different interventions, some of them originating from faculty, and others imposed from legislative mandates at the state level. These efforts focus on reducing the amount of pre-college or remedial coursework that students are required to complete prior to taking degree-credit courses, responding to research suggesting that students who take remedial coursework are less likely to be retained to college.

The Accelerated Learning Program, developed by faculty at the Community College of Baltimore County, is a faculty-driven model that moved students assessed as needing remedial coursework into a college-credit writing course with co-requisite support in the form of class time and more intensive small group instruction. Earlier faculty-led efforts include stretch courses, which extend a college-level course over two semesters; and the writing studio model, a less-structured precursor to co-requisite courses.

In some states, legislation and other mandates from governing entities have driven basic writing reform. For instance, California's AB 705 "clarif[ies] existing regulation and ensure[s] that students are not placed into remedial courses that may delay or deter their educational progress unless evidence suggests they are highly unlikely to succeed in the college-level course." Community college teachers and administrators have sought to adjust their curriculum and placement mechanisms to respond to the legislation.

Often reform efforts start with legislative or board mandates, but implementation is designed by faculty: the California Acceleration Project is "a faculty-led network that supports California's 116 community colleges to transform English and math programs"; public institutions in Idaho collaborated to respond to state board mandates to eliminate remedial courses while "retaining agency and individuality of institutions...while still working from common frameworks with shared goals rooted in disciplinary expertise and practice."

== Critiques of basic writing ==
Critiques of basic writing and some of its major theorists have been plentiful and ongoing for decades. Min Zhan Lu, for example, problematized Shaugnessy's essentialist view of language, expectation that basic writers adjust to mainstream linguistic standards, and failed to acknowledge political, economic, and institutional contexts that shape the designation of basic writers and basic writing. Other notable scholars of basic writing, however, like Laura Gray-Rosendale have claimed that such critiques of Shaughnessy do not hold much critical weight. "Shaughnessy's works," themselves, she claims, "render ambiguous if not outright defy many such negative characterizations."

In 1992, the Fourth National Basic Writing Conference saw vigorous debate on the definition and very existence of basic writing. In 1993 the Journal of Basic Writing published some key talks from the conference. David Bartholomae argued basic writing as a program was a form of maintaining the status quo and that the purpose and definition of basic writing should be a continually contested term. Peter Adams released preliminary data showing students placed into basic writing courses at the Community College of Baltimore County had extremely low success rates. Adams later led the testing and implementation of the Accelerated Learning Program.

Ira Shor called basic writing "Our Apartheid" in 1997, noting its effects on both students (adding more layers to "gateway" courses, segregating students, and slowing progress to degree and thus economic improvements) and faculty (basic writing often taught by part-time adjunct faculty). Shor positions basic writing and declining labor conditions for those teaching it as a kind of conservative backlash to the open-access, but is careful to critique the system rather than colleagues.

More recent critiques of basic writing have framed its inception and founders (including Shaughnessy) as a "pedagogical white backlash to integration" and claimed that part of the reason reform efforts have been slow is due to "white innocence." Carmen Kynard, like Lu, critiqued Shaughnessy's essentialist view of language, and re-framed the traditional story of basic writing by considering it in context of HBCUs and Black teaching practices. Vershawn Ashanti Young cast the insistence on a single standard "academic" English in written and oral communication as requiring Black students to code switch, which Young links to W.E.B. Du Bois' concept of double consciousness and the "separate but equal" logic of Jim Crow laws. Molloy and Bennett call for the field to end basic writing and the paradigm of deeming some entering college students "basic" writers.

== See also ==
- Composition studies
- Cooling out
- First-year composition
- Literacy
- Theories of rhetoric and composition pedagogy
