= Rhetorical listening =

Rhetorical listening is a theoretical model for translating listening into language and action, developed by feminist Rhetoric and Composition scholar Krista Ratcliffe. Within academic fields of Rhetoric, Composition, and Writing Studies, Ratcliffe changed the understanding of listening. Rhetorical listening is defined as "a trope for interpretive invention" and "a code for cross-cultural conduct" which seeks to restore listening to equal status with the tropes of reading, writing, and speaking. The theory was articulated in response to Jacqueline Jones Royster's 1995 Conference on College Composition and Communication chair address, which called for new models for effective cross-cultural communication, particularly across racial and ethnic differences. Rhetorical listening has been applied as an analytic to a variety of topics and practices including ethics, teaching, tutoring, political analysis and debate, literary and rhetorical criticism, and language research and advocacy.

Rhetorical listening requires attentive consideration of individuals' intentions with the goal of understanding, a posture which surpasses passive listening. Shari Stenberg extends this framework to classroom pedagogy arguing that a learned tendency toward critiquing texts can lead students to evaluate them too quickly or dismiss them before coming to an understanding of the cultural logics that shape them. Drawing on Ratcliffe's metaphor of "standing under," Stenberg describes rhetorical listening as a practice through which readers allow discourses to inform their politics and ethics rather than defaulting to an agonistic stance against others' ideas. "Standing under," thus, grants access to a comprehensive view of various perspectives and allow for (re)conceptualization of one's own commitments. Instead of merely accumulating others' ideas, people are open to being changed by them, potentially shifting how they understand the various identities and cultural logics that undergird rhetorical acts.

== Background and development ==
Krista Ratcliffe contended that much literacy teaching in the U.S. emphasizes classical Western rhetorical theory that foregrounds speaking and writing but ignores listening. These theories mainly focus on how the rhetor's speech or writing can persuade the audience. The goal of classical rhetoric studies was to address what the audience should listen for, rather than how to listen.

Ratcliffe wrote of her work as expanding on Kenneth Burke's rhetorical theory of identification, which Burke argued was critical for persuasion. Noting that identification with the Other is often troubled by systemic barriers resulting from unjust historical realities, power dynamics, and human ignorance, Ratcliffe sought to investigate how rhetorical listening might be used to foster "conscious identifications with gender and whiteness" that could facilitate more effective cross-cultural communication.

Drawing on Gemma Corradi Fiumara's concept of a "divided logos," Ratcliffe described a split in Western rhetorical traditions that privileges speaking, argument, and production over listening. This division resulted in separation of logos from receptive and interpretive practices within the field of Rhetoric and Composition and led to an emphasis on writing, argumentation, reason, and persuasion.

Ratcliffe and Stenberg contrast this to a "restored logos," which (re)shapes the functions and outcomes of listening. In the divided logos, the receiver takes in the argument while simultaneously judging it and anticipating how they will respond to the speaker or writer. In contrast, the restored logos treats listening not as passive reception or a pause before responding but as an active rhetorical practice that requires reflecting on the limits of the listener or reader's own assumptions and making meaning by attuning empathetically to the experiences of the Other before responding.

Aristotle's classical work, Rhetoric, serves as an example of divided logos, according to Ratcliffe. Although instruction in oral discourse—the dominant rhetorical mode that Aristotle taught—required attunement to one's audience's beliefs and values in order to produce and analyze enthymemes, listening was still displaced and diminished. In this reading, Aristotle's rhetoric was oriented towards persuasion, with listening functioning primarily as a tool for producing better speech rather than as a reciprocal practice for increasing understanding across difference.

Stenberg argues the attention given to speaking without listening "perpetuates a homogenized mode of speech based on competition rather than dialogue." Ratcliffe attributed this listening neglect to several Western cultural biases: speaking being gendered as masculine while listening is understood as feminine; racialized expectations in the United States that have historically privileged white people while people of color have been expected to listen; and a Western cultural preference for sight over sound as its primary interpretive trope. In naming these first two Western cultural biases, Ratcliffe acknowledges a common power imbalance also described by Rosina Lippi-Green between interlocutors in communicative interactions where one participant in expected to listen more while the other is granted more agency to speak, thus sharing the communicative burden unequally.

Ratcliffe adds that we have drawn on Western Rhetorical theories and have implemented those into writing practices. She argues that the practice of listening is not implemented in writing compared to oral discourse, to which it is commonly associated. The second bias of theories included is that it traditionally slighted listening. The aim of these rhetorical practices is to persuade, not necessarily listening.

Ratcliffe encourages language scholars to adopt listening as a novel ethical strategy for co-constituting meaning and comprehending discourses related not only to race but also to gender and other modes of difference. Understanding rhetorical listening as a technique for creative interpretation, she argues it originates from a space within language where listeners can employ an agency characterized by capacity and willingness. This approach utilizes listening as a tool to gain insight into the perspectives and voices of others, promoting interpretation, reflection, and the co-creation between writer and reader/listener of fresh significance. To this end, Ratcliffe asserted that rhetorical listening embodies a "stance of openness that a person may choose to assume in relation to any person, text, or culture." The integration of this practice of rhetoric will encourage students to, "move away from dysfunctional silence or unproductive stances," as well as talking past one another in group settings. As an outcome of this openness, Ratcliffe claimed that rhetorical listening cultivates conscious willingness to engage in good faith, thereby fostering effective communication, particularly in cross-cultural settings.

=== Video narrative ===
Wenqi Cui examines another form of rhetorical listening through video narratives. Cui suggests that platforms which integrate text, images, and video can support communication. The theory focuses on how rhetorical listening can be practiced through multimodal tools and how such tools may facilitate engagement with marginalized voices.

== Practical applications ==
In her book, Ratcliffe theorizes rhetorical listening as a practice that can be used to listen to public debates and everyday interactions, where differences in identity and perception can shape how speakers are understood or misinterpreted. The practice can also be used to listen to scholarly discussions, what Ratcliffe calls "eavesdropping" and to student resistance in the classroom (or pedagogical listening).

Paula Tompkins applies rhetorical listening to communication ethics beyond the classroom by arguing that it can cultivate moral sensitivity through helping readers or listeners recognize people whose presence has been obscured. Drawing on written records from the Tuskegee Syphilis Study in the mid-20th century United States, she invites readers to notice how the researchers used scientific and bureaucratic language to obscure the humanity of the research subjects, rendering them objects of study rather than individuals embedded in families and communities, who are absent in the text. Rhetorical listening for absences in this way, Tompkins argues, remedies the inadequacy of good character, ethical codes, or moral reasoning, and allows people to perceive how the Other is affected by harm.

=== Classroom applications ===
Shari Stenberg addresses why listening has been devalued and not taught explicitly in the classroom. She notes that students are taught to read sources as a part of entering a scholarly conversation, but they tend to read in order to accumulate knowledge or demonstrate their mastery over the material. As a result, academic discourse has prioritized agonistic competition rather than dialogue while also excluding the voices of groups and individuals that have traditionally held less social power.

Wayne Booth's concept of "rhetoric of assent" and Peter Elbow's work on playing the "believing game" parallel Ratcliffe and Stenberg's attempt to interrupt the academic habit of jumping to critique before sitting with a text long enough to understand it. Echoing Booth and Elbow, Stenberg argues that academic discourse often prioritizes the question of how to change others' minds over the question of when one's own mind should change. She stresses that effective communication requires not only strategies for persuasion or refutation but also the capacity to listen to opposing viewpoints and consider where assent may be warranted.

In Wendy Wolters Hindshaw's approach incorporating feminist pedagogy, highlights the role of open communication between students and teachers. She suggests that classrooms should place a greater emphasis on listening as an active process, which can promote comfortability in classrooms.

Linda Bannister presents another strategy for teachers to practice rhetorical listening and improve cultural sensitivity in the classroom by applying practices from Deaf Studies. This kind of listening pedagogy requires students (1) to be attentive and reduce distracting noises; (2) share their story, including their cultural background, so that classmates can be familiar with their perspective; (3) engage in "critical dialogue" in order to understand others; and (4) pay attention to their classmates' body language and the messages it sends.

Alli Tharp and Emily Johnston proposed a listening-oriented curriculum built upon rhetorical listening and integrated the practice in their classrooms. Their methods for including listening practices consist of aiming to shift students' focus from striving to win arguments to exploring their own beliefs as well as others. Within their own classrooms they introduce students to a wide range of ideologies, to allow them to explore different perspectives. In implementing this practice, they found that it helps students become, "flexible, introspective communicators adept at addressing the needs of diverse audiences and contexts and helping instructors develop pedagogical agency." They further include the possible repercussions of not implementing the practice of listening within the curriculum. They suggest that "a failure to listen or an internalized belief that listening has no place in writing can lead to a lack of authentic engagement with difference."

Rhetorical listening in the classroom can also be used to shed more light onto why students are silent. Janice Cools discusses several reasons for silence in the ESL/ELL composition classroom, such as students holding back their wisdom on purpose to avoid being harassed by peers and instructors for giving a wrong answer. The fear and doubt that can result from this type of response might lead to feelings of incompetence and discomfort in an individual and cause them to continue in silence in the classroom. Classroom applications of rhetorical listening have been developed through Sketch Noting, a framework that encourages student participation, values the sharing of insights, and recognizes silence as a meaningful component of communication.

A further reason why students may choose to remain in silence, according to Cools, is that they have been taught to assume such a posture, especially at the secondary school level in some cultural contexts (e.g. Puerto Rico.) In classroom settings with mixed English-language learners or other primary languages, the interpretation of silence requires patience and contextual understanding.

Rhetorical listening is challenging in politics because it is intended for, "learning and connection," but also for "challenge, conflict, dissonance and persuasion." Political debate often involves disagreement and rhetorical listening is a method of maintaining dialogue across differences. Rhetorical listening in politics has an "aim to maintain connections that enable shared action despite deep inequalities and unavoidable conflicts." It also challenges debaters to, "not simply allow another to speak, but rather foreground interaction, exchange and interdependence. "Marginalized voices are included in the conversation and this practice allows unrepresented voices to be heard."

=== Research ===
Rhetorical Listening can be a tool for navigating controversial conversations. Researchers found that students paid increased attention to social justice issues following their classroom debates.

Other scholars have also taken up rhetorical listening for other applications. Meagan Rodgers developed the intent/effect tactic as one way for students to practice rhetorical listening in the English composition classroom. The application of this tool is meant to disrupt racially discriminatory stereotypes and utterances. Rodgers found in her research that even if a person does not perceive themselves to be racist, racism or racial stereotypes are subconsciously perpetuated when a member of the majority or dominant group points out racial differences of a minority group member. Rather than confronting students and jeopardizing their willingness to participate in classroom discussions, the intent/effect strategy invites students to (1) consider numerous perspectives about a statement, and (2) understand that well-meant comments (intent) can be perceived as having a deleterious effect.

Cools suggests asking students in writing why they are or are not silent in their classes, "how [they] interpret other students' silences [...] and what a professor should infer from [students'] silence." She reports that students have told her that silence can be beneficial as it shows their focus on the material, gives them an opportunity to get to know a different perspective while listening to their peers, and allows them to reflect and process questions. Moreover, discussions can be perceived as interruption because classmates do not have expert knowledge. Cools concludes that silence in the classroom should be appreciated and respected.

== Critical reception ==
In a review of Ratcliffe's book in the Kenneth Burke Journal, Steven Pedersen highlights the negative impact of stereotypes and prejudices on communication, noting that they can foster dis-identification and complicate or short-circuit cross-cultural exchange. Conversely, rhetorical listening promotes cross-cultural understanding and allows students and teachers to disrupt the common loop of reciprocal resistance—defensiveness and pushback that results when an instructor presents material that challenges' students in relation to gender, whiteness, power or other topics they may find uncomfortable.

While he does not reject the concept of rhetorical listening itself, Louis Maraj raises concerns that whiteness-centered antiracist frameworks within Rhetoric and Composition have centered the work of white scholars, such as Ratcliffe and Robin DiAngelo, rather than highlighting the work of Black scholars like Ibrahim X. Kendi, bell hooks, or Carmen Kynard.

== See also ==
- Active listening
- Dialogic listening
- Empathetic listening
- Feminist rhetoric
- Krista Ratcliffe
- Listening
- Silence
