= Carmen Kynard =

American academic

- Known for: Antiracism, black culture, language, literacy
- Awards: Richard C. Ohmann Outstanding Article Award (2023), 2015 James M. Britton Award

Academic work
- Institutions: Texas Christian University

Carmen Kynard is the Lillian Radford Chair in Rhetoric and Composition and a Professor of English at Texas Christian University. Before that, she worked at John Jay College of Criminal Justice and the Graduate Center of the City University of New York. Her research focuses on race, Black feminism, AfroDigital/Black languages and cultures, and schooling dynamics, particularly in composition, rhetoric, and literacy studies.

She has taught in New York City's public schools and in teacher education. Her research has appeared in Harvard Educational Review, Changing English, College English, Reading Research Quarterly, College Composition and Communication, and Literacy and Composition Studies.

Kynard is the author of Vernacular Insurrections: Race, Black Protest, and the New Century in Composition-Literacy Studies, which won the 2015 James N. Britton Award presented by the National Council of Teachers of English (NCTE). In 2023, Kynard was honored with the Richard C. Ohmann Outstanding Article Award for scholarship published in the academic journal College English.

== Critical race literacy ==
=== Vernacular insurrections ===
In Vernacular Insurrections, Kynard defines "vernacular insurrections" as Black communities using their literary and cultural practices, linguistics, and political resistance to challenge oppressive academic influence and standards. During the 1970s, the American curriculum taught writing as a universal process where one formula fits all. Kynard argued this Eurocentric educational norms failed to recognize cultural linguistic practices and discriminated against BIPOC students. Instead, she advocates for implementing anti-racist and Black historical context within composition and rhetoric pedagogy, similar to the modern idea of Critical race theory. She argues that the 1980s “post-process,” or academic institutions' revelation that writing and rhetoric is tied deeply to culture and background, is nothing new. Instead, writing has been used as a political tool by Black students and activists since the 1920s. Kynard claims activists such as black students during the 1924-25 Fisk University Protests and the Black Caucus of the National Council of Teachers of English (NCTE) were key catalysts integrating Black history and acknowledgment of black community protest within U.S English curriculum.

=== SRTOL ===
Kynard argues the Black Power movement was crucial in implementing Black studies programs. Student-led protests for Black studies and arts created spaces in predominantly white universities and HBCUs where AAVE and Black language became accepted. In her research on composition studies, Carmen Kynard reframes the Conference on College Composition and Communication’s (CCCC) 1974 policy Students’ Right to Their Own Language (SRTOL), a policy that challenged linguistic diversity and non-mainstream dialects' stigmatization. However, Kynard argues that this policy was not a result of simple academic progression towards racial equity and inclusion of BIPOC students. Rather than an isolated policy, she views that SRTOL was enacted as a main result of the Black Power movement during the 1960s and Black student resistance.

=== Script-flipping and code-meshing ===
In her writing, Kynard actively criticizes writing norms in the way she writes. She uses a rhetorical practice that professor David F. Green calls "script-flipping." It is a blend of using Black language and "White Mainstream English," also commonly referred to as code-meshing. Unlike code-switching, which deliberately switches from different dialects or linguistics depending on the audience, Kynard's writing changes between the two diction styles organically. Following in the footsteps of Black studies and literacy scholars such as Geneva Smitherman and Jacqueline Royster, Kynard uses script-flipping to combat White Mainstream English and linguistic racism by illustrating that Black language is a valid academic writing technique.

== Awards and Accolades ==
- 2026 American Educational Research Association (AERA)'s Special Interest Group: Critical Examination of Race, Ethnicity, Class, and Gender - Senior Scholar Award
- 2015 Parlor Press, The Best of Independent Composition and Rhetoric Journals' “Best Article” Award - Teaching While Black: Racial Violence and the Landscapes of Disciplinary Whiteness
- 2006 Cultural Diversity Award, NCTE’s Conference on English Education for “The Skin I’m In’: Using voice Scholarship and Young Adult Literature about youth of Color to Transform Urban Teacher Curriculum”
