= Virginia M. Burke =

American scholar and teacher (1916–1978)

Virginia M. Burke (May 19, 1916 – 1978) was a pioneering scholar of composition and Black literature at the University of Wisconsin-Milwaukee. She was a previous president of the Wisconsin Council of Teachers of English.

== Biography ==
Virginia Marie Burke was born in Hopedale, Massachusetts in 1916. She obtained her bachelor's degree from Worcester State College in 1938. From 1938 to 1946, she taught high school English and foreign languages. She achieved her master's degree from Boston University in 1942, and her Ed.D. from Columbia University in 1956. She began working at the University of Wisconsin-Milwaukee in 1956. She served as the president of the Wisconsin Council of Teachers of English in 1964. From 1959 to 1962, she served on the National Council of Teachers of English Committee on Convention Newsletters. In 1964 she began a project on the rhetorician Fred Newton Scott, which remains unpublished. Burke expressed She served on the advisory board of the Black American Literature Forum. She supported the Conference on College Composition and Communication's statement "Students' Right to Their Own Language." She died in 1978. The Virginia Burke Award at the University of Wisconsin-Milwaukee is named in her honor.

== Works ==
Burke was an early member of the Conference on College Composition and Communication. She published on several topics of interest in the early days of composition studies, including the relationship of rhetoric to composition ("The Composition-Rhetoric Pyramid," The New Century: Composition-Rhetoric), professional writing (Newsletter Writing and Publishing: A Practical Guide), and paragraph theory ("The Paragraph: Dancer in Chains," The Paragraph in Context). She also published one of the first articles on multimodal composing ("Why Not Try Collage?") and works on writing program administration (The Lay Reader Program in Action, The Lay Reader Program: Backgrounds and Procedures, "A Candid Opinion on Lay Readers").

Because English teachers were often charged with teaching dialect to minorities in the 1950s, Burke also engaged in work respecting African-American Vernacular English. These works include Burke's co-authored "Research Critiques: Review of Problems in Oral English," reviews on dialectology books, and A Various Language: Perspectives on American Dialects (co-written with Juanita V. Williamson).

Burke also promoted diversifying the readings students were exposed to in literature courses. Her articles on the subject include "Pupils and Books," "Black Literature for Whom?", "Mummy Didn't Mean No Harm," and "The Veil and the Vision." She also encouraged studies of Zora Neale Hurston. See "Zora Neale Hurston and Fannie Hurst as They Saw Each Other" and her review of Robert Hemenway and Alice Walker's Zora Neale Hurston: A Literary Biography).
