= W. Ross Winterowd =

American rhetorician (1930–2011)

- Born: 24 January 1930; Salt Lake City, Utah
- Died: 21 January 2011 (aged 80); Los Angeles, California
- Occupations: Professor of English and rhetoric at USC and a scholar and writer in the fields of rhetoric and composition.
- Known for: Rhetoric, Composition Studies, Writing Pedagogy

Academic background
- Education: Utah State University (B.A.), University of Utah (Ph.D.)

Academic work
- Discipline: Rhetoric, Composition, Literary Theory
- Notable works: The Rhetoric of the "Other" Literature,*Writing and Teaching Writing

W. Ross Winterowd (January 24, 1930 – January 21, 2011) was an American rhetorician and literary theorist from the United States. His focus as an academic was interdisciplinary connections between rhetoric, linguistics, and education.

== Education ==
He earned his B.S. from Utah State University in 1952. During his undergraduate years at Utah State University, Winterowd showed an early interest in literature and rhetoric, which shaped his future academic focus. After finishing his undergraduate education, Winterowd served in the United States Army for three years, from 1952 to 1955. Following his military service, he pursued higher education at the University of Utah, where he obtained his Ph.D. in 1965 at the age of 35.

== Teaching career ==
Winterowd began his career as an instructor at Carson College from 1955 to 1956, followed by roles as a teaching assistant at Kansas University from 1956 to 1957 and the University of Utah from 1957 to 1960. He then served as an instructor and assistant professor at the University of Montana from 1962 to 1966. Majority of Winterowd’s career was spent at the University of Southern California, where he held positions as an associate professor and professor from 1966 to 1971.

During his time at USC, Winterowd was the founder and Director of the Ph.D. program in Rhetoric, Linguistics, and Literature and was honored with the prestigious Bruce R. McElderry Professorship in 1971. During Winterowd’s career, he mentored many graduate students while working on their dissertations. Winterowd's personal insight and teaching experiences he was able to empathize the importance of preparing students for critical and reflective thinking.

He also examined the evolution of the English departments, addressing the tensions between traditional literary studies and emerging disciplines like rhetoric, composition, and literacy analysis. His work highlighted the shift within English departments from classical studies to modern focuses, such as rhetoric and composition.

At the University of Southern California, Winterowd developed one of the first interdisciplinary doctoral programs combining rhetoric, linguistics, and literature in the United States. Throughout his tenure, Winterowd authored and edited numerous influential textbooks on composition and rhetoric, which were widely adopted in academic institutions.

Beyond his academic pursuits, Winterowd led writing workshops for senior citizens, culminating in the publication of Senior Citizens Writing: A Workshop and Anthology (2007).

Throughout his academic career, Winterowd authored, co-authored, or edited over a dozen books and more than 50 articles. Notable works include The Contemporary Writer (1975), The English Department: A Personal and Institutional History (1998), and Attitudes: Selected Prose and Poetry (2010).

== Scholarship ==
In "The Grammar of Coherence", he highlighted the interplay between linguistic structures and rhetorical clarity, bridging theoretical linguistics with practical classroom applications.

Winterowd’s contributions also extended to syntactic fluency and pedagogical stylistics, as demonstrated in his "Prolegomenon to Pedagogical Stylistics." He advocated for sentence-combining exercises as a means to cultivate rhetorical effectiveness, showcasing his commitment to teaching approaches that integrate theoretical insights with tangible learning strategies. His exploration of coherence in multimodal contexts further reflected the adaptability of his principles, aligning traditional literacy frameworks with contemporary digital modes of communication.

Through his numerous publications and teaching innovations, Winterowd shaped composition studies by combining rigorous theoretical frameworks with pragmatic pedagogical methods.

== Notable awards ==
- Bruce R. McElderry Professor at USC (1971): Recognized for his academic contributions and service to the field of composition and rhetoric.
- 1998 USC Emeriti Center and Emeriti Center College’s Honorary Borchard Lectureship for exemplifying a lifetime of scholarly production.
- 2010 CCCC Exemplar Award for his achievements in rhetoric and composition, honoring W. Ross Winterowd’s pioneering work in advancing composition theory, rhetorical studies, and pedagogy.

== Selected publications ==
=== Books ===
- Winterowd, W. Ross. (1968). Rhetoric: A synthesis. Holt, Rinehart and Winston.
- Winterowd, W. Ross. (1975). Contemporary rhetoric: A conceptual background with readings. Harcourt Brace Jovanovich.
- Winterowd, W. Ross. (1986). Composition/rhetoric: A synthesis. Harcourt Brace Jovanovich.
- Winterowd, W. Ross. (1987). The history of rhetoric and the teaching of writing. National Council of Teachers of English.
- Winterowd, W. Ross. (1989). The culture and politics of literacy. Oxford University Press.
- Winterowd, W. Ross. (1990). The rhetoric of the “other” literature. University of Pittsburgh Press.
- Winterowd, W. Ross. (1991). Writing and teaching writing: A comprehensive handbook for writing teachers. Longman.
- Winterowd, W. Ross., & Blum, J. (1994). A teacher’s introduction to composition in the rhetorical tradition. National Council of Teachers of English.
- Winterowd, W. Ross. (1998). The English department: A personal and institutional history. Southern Illinois University Press.
- Winterowd, W. Ross. (2003). (Ed.). Literacy: A critical sourcebook. Bedford/St. Martin's.
- Winterowd, W. Ross. (2004). Searching for faith: A skeptic’s journey. Parlor Press.
- Winterowd, W. Ross. (2007). Senior citizens writing. Parlor Press.

=== Articles ===
- Winterowd, W. Ross. (1970). The grammar of coherence. College Composition and Communication, 31(8), 828–835.
- Winterowd, W. Ross. (1973). Topics and levels in the composing process. College Composition and Communication, 34(5), 701–709.
- Winterowd, W. Ross. (1976). The rhetorical transaction of reading. College Composition and Communication, 27(2), 123–135.
- Winterowd, W. Ross. (1976). The rhetoric of beneficence, authority, ethical commitment, and the negative. Philosophy and Rhetoric, 9(2), 65–83.
- Winterowd, W. Ross. (1980). Developing a composition program. In A. Freedman & I. Pringle (Eds.), Reinventing the rhetorical tradition (pp. 157–171). Canadian Council of Teachers of English.
- Winterowd, W. Ross. (1985). The politics of meaning. College English, 12(2), 177–179.
- Winterowd, W. Ross. (1987). The purification of literature and rhetoric. Rhetoric Review, 49(3), 257–273.
- Winterowd, W. Ross. (1992). I.A. Richards, literary theory, and romantic composition. Composition Studies, 11(1), 59–78.
