= Kathleen Blake Yancey =

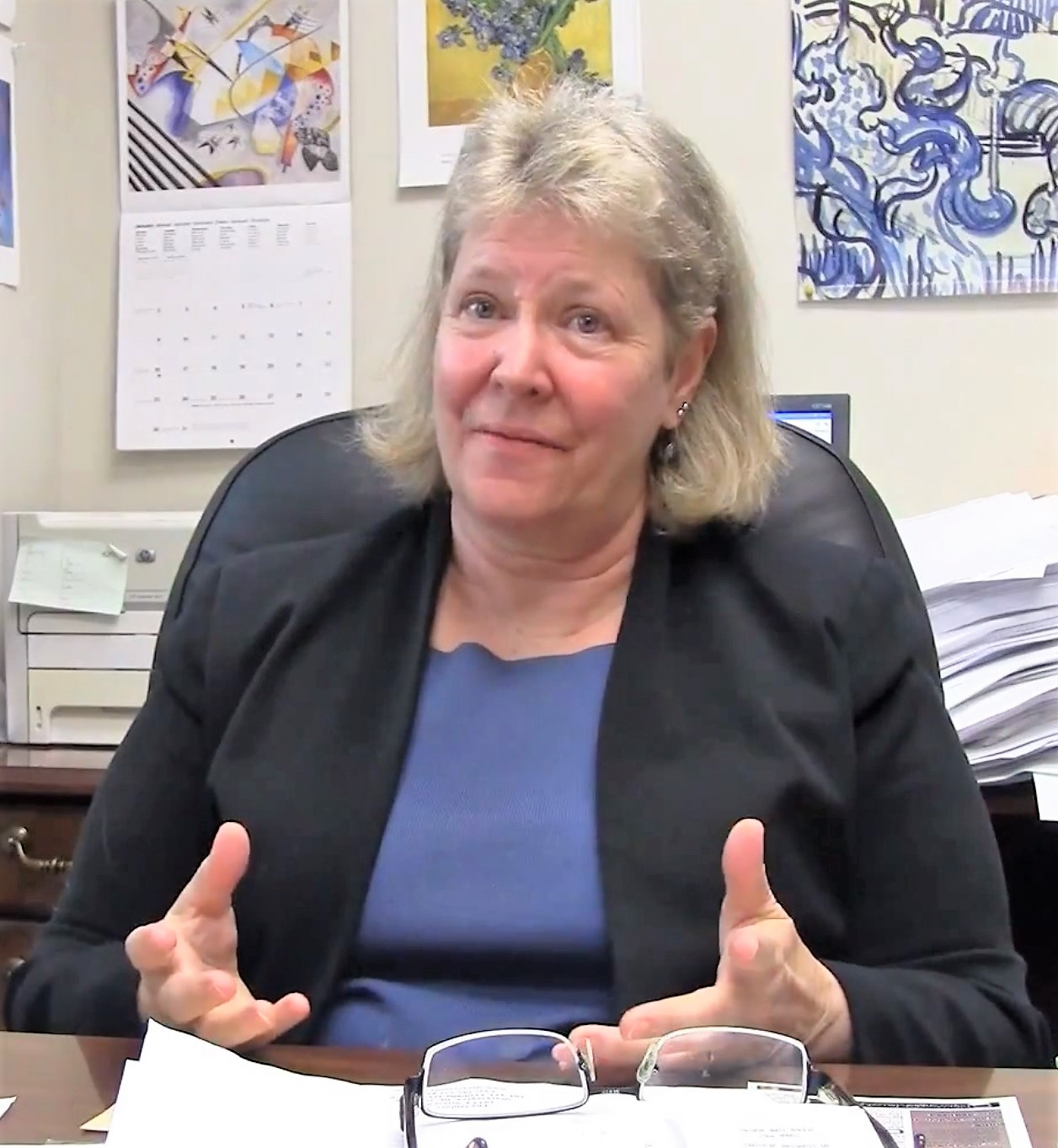
Yancey discussing an article for Kairos in 2013

Kathleen Blake Yancey (5 July 1950) is the Kellogg W. Hunt Professor of English at Florida State University in the rhetoric and composition program. Her research interests include composition studies, writing knowledge, creative non-fiction, and writing assessment.

She earned her MA in English at Virginia Polytechnic and State University and her PhD in 1983 from Purdue University. Prior to working at Florida State University, she held faculty positions at University of North Carolina – Charlotte and Clemson University. At Clemson University, she directed the Clemson Digital Portfolio Institute and developed the Studio for Student Communication.

== Professional Contributions ==
Yancey has focused her research on various areas of composition and rhetoric studies, including the intersection of composition, cultural studies, and the delivery of composition instruction. In addition, Yancey had focused on writing that people choose to do and refers to this as everyday writing. Some examples include a letter, a general note, an email, etc. She also discusses how scholars in academia do not necessarily focus on this concept but emphasizes the importance of it as this type of writing could give more creative freedom than a traditional assignment. She created a classroom setting where students determined the importance of the writing they do independent of the classroom and coined this the Museum of Everyday Writing.

She has mentioned that people can use technology in one way and use in other types of fashion. She has advocated that technology should be learned to possibly help students transfer knowledge from one context to another. She has researched and published on the subject of reflection in the practice of composing. She has discussed how students and teachers should set aside time for reflection because individuals can see what has worked, what they did not notice, and what to do in the future. She also believes that people should not blame themselves or others when things do not work and plans must change. She has also produced work on the assessment of student writing and the transfer of writing knowledge, and she has also focused on the subject of writing across the curriculum. She has talked about how administrators and teachers should find ways to help students incorporate their self-sponsored and everyday writing practices into the academic classroom. In her 2004 Chair’s Address at CCCC, she indicated her ongoing interest in the impact of digital technologies on composition studies. Along with this, she has produced research on multimodal composition. She has also continuously explored portfolio pedagogy in works such as Electronic Portfolios: Emerging Practices in Student, Faculty, and Institutional Learning, Electronic Portfolios 2.0: Emergent Research on Implementation and Impact and Portfolios in the Writing Classroom: An Introduction and her co-leadership of the Inter/National Coalition on Electronic Portfolio Research with Darren and Barbara Cambridge.

== Leadership positions ==
From 2001–2005, Yancey served on the Conference on College Composition and Communication (CCCC) as Chair, Past Chair, Associate Chair, and Assistant Chair. she currently serves as editor of the College Composition and Communication journal, and she co-edited the Assessing Writing journal, which she also co-founded, for seven years. Yancey also served as President, Past President, President-Elect, and Vice-President of the National Council of Teachers of English (NCTE) from 2007–2009. From 2011–2014, she served as President, Past President, and Vice President of the South Atlantic Modern Language Association (SAMLA). In addition, she served on the Council of Writing Program Administrators as President, Past President, and Vice President from 1999–2005.

She also serves on the National Board for Miami University’s Howe Center for Writing Excellence, the Executive Committee for the Association for Authentic, Experiential and Evidenced-Based Learning (AAEEBL), and the editorial boards of the Kairos and Computers and Composition journals. In addition, she co-leads the Inter/National Coalition on Electronic Portfolio Research with Barbara and Darren Cambridge.

== Awards ==
- 2019 National Council of Teachers of English (NCTE) James R. Squire Award for her longstanding career
- 2018 College on College Composition and Communication (CCCC) Exemplar Award for her work in composition and rhetoric
- 2015 Conference on College Composition and Communication (CCCC) Research Impact Award for her book co-written with Liane Robertson and Kara Taczak
- 2014 Florida State University Graduate Faculty Mentor Award for her contribution as a faculty member
- 2013 Donald Murray Prize at the CCCC annual convention for best writing on the subject of composition
- 2012 Purdue University Distinguished Women Scholars for her scholarly work as a Purdue alumnus

== Selected publications ==
=== Books ===
- Cambridge, D., Barbara L. Cambridge, and Kathleen Yancey, eds. Electronic Portfolios: Emerging Practices in Student, Faculty, and Institutional Learning. Washington, D.C.: American Association for Higher Education, 2001. Print.
- Cambridge, D., Barbara L. Cambridge, and Kathleen Yancey, eds. Electronic Portfolios 2.0: Emergent Research on Implementation and Impact. Sterling, VA: Stylus Pub, 2009. Print.
- Smith, J. and Kathleen Blake Yancey, eds. Self-Assessment and Development in Writing: A Collaborative Inquiry. Cresskill, NJ: Hampton Press, 2000. Print.
- Yancey, Kathleen Blake, ed. Portfolios in the Writing Classroom: An Introduction. Urbana, Ill.: National Council of Teachers of English, 1992. Print.
- Yancey, Kathleen Blake, ed. Voices on Voice: Perspectives, Definitions, Inquiry. Urbana, IL: National Council of Teachers of English, 1994. Print.
- Yancey, Kathleen Blake. Reflection in the Writing Classroom. Logan, UT: Utah State University Press, 1998. Print.
- Yancey, Kathleen Blake. Teaching Literature as Reflective Practice. Urbana, Ill.: National Council of Teachers of English, 2004. Print.
- Yancey, Kathleen Blake, ed. Delivering College Composition: The Fifth Canon. Portsmouth, NH: Boynton/Cook, 2006. Print.
- Yancey, K. and Brian A. Huot, eds. Assessing Writing across the Curriculum: Diverse Approaches and Practices. Greenwich, CT: Ablex Pub. Corp., 1997. Print
- Yancey, K., Sarah Robbins, Dede Yow, and George Seaman, eds. Teachers' Writing Groups: Collaborative Inquiry and Reflection for Professional Growth. Kennesaw, GA: Kennesaw State University Press, 2006. Print.
- Yancey, K., Liane Robertson, and Kara Taczak, eds. Writing Across Contexts: Transfer, Composition, and Sites of Writing. Boulder, CO: Utah State University Press, 2014. Print.
- Yancey, K. and Irwin Weiser, eds. Situating Portfolios: Four Perspectives. Logan, UT: Utah State University Press, 1997. Print.

=== Articles ===
- Yancey, Kathleen Blake. "Everyday Writing: An Introduction."South Atlantic Review" (2020), 85(2)
- Yancey, K. B. (2020). The Museum of Everyday Writing: Exhibits of Everyday Writing Articulating the Past, Representing the Present, and Anticipating the Future. South Atlantic Review, 85(2)
- Yancey, Kathleen Blake. “Attempting the Impossible: Designing a First-Year Composition Course.” First-Year Composition: From Theory to Practice. Eds. Deborah Coxwell-Teague and Ron Lunsford. Anderson, SC: Parlor Press, 2014.
- Davis, Matt and Kathleen Blake Yancey. "Notes toward the Role of Materiality in Composing, Reviewing, and Assessing Multimodal Texts." Computers and Composition. 31 (2014): 13-28. Print.
