= Donald McQuade =

American academic and writer (1941–2025)

Donald A. McQuade
- Born: December 26, 1941
- Died: August 17, 2025 (aged 83)
- Occupation: Professor
- Board member of: National Writing Project; Conference on College Composition and Communication
- Children: 2

Academic background
- Education: St. Francis College, B.A. Rutgers University, MA & PhD

Academic work
- Discipline: English Composition, American Literature, Writing Studies
- Institutions: University of California, Berkeley; Queens College

Donald A. McQuade (December 26, 1941 – August 17, 2025) was an English professor at the University of California, Berkeley, and the author of several books on writing composition, American literature, and advertising. He served as vice chancellor of university relations from 1999 to 2006. McQuade was also the chair of the board of the National Writing Project from 2008 to 2012.

== Early life and education ==
McQuade grew up in Brooklyn, New York, and attended St. Francis College in Brooklyn Heights. He was a member of the national championship team in men's water polo. McQuade studied at Rutgers University in New Jersey, where he received both his MA and PhD in English literature.

== Career ==
Before his tenure at Berkeley, McQuade taught at Queens College in New York. Specifically, McQuade taught for the open admissions program, that affords any student that has received a high school diploma to enroll in its college courses, regardless of past GPA or test scores. With respect to CUNY's Open Admissions Program, McQuade and Sandra Schor helped to create the Queens English Project. The project aimed to improve the writing skills of college-bound high school students and first-year college students in Queens County.

Beginning in 1986, McQuade was on staff at the University of California, Berkeley and taught courses on American literature, Writing studies, and American studies. Apart from teaching, McQuade served in a number of administrative posts at Berkeley. He was vice provost and dean of undergraduate and interdisciplinary studies, the founding dean of American studies, the founder of UC Berkeley's college writing program, and chairman of the department of dramatic art. As dean of undergraduate studies, he designed the undergraduate research apprentice program (URAP). From 1999 to 2006, he was the vice chancellor for university relations, where he oversaw alumni relations and fundraising for the university.

McQuade sat on several non-profit boards and was the chair of the Conference on College Composition and Communication (CCCC) and the National Writing Project.

He became the co-founder and executive chairman of WriteLab in 2013, a startup focused on improving student writing located in Berkeley, California.

== Personal life and death ==
McQuade's wife, with whom he had two children, was a teacher as well; he also had five grandchildren. McQuade died on August 17, 2025, in Oakland, California at the age of 83.

== Published work ==
- The Writer's Presence: A Pool of Readings Don McQuade and Robert Atwan. 2011.
- Harper Single Volume American Literature, 3rd Edition Don McQuade and Robert Atwan. 1998.
- Seeing and Writing Don McQuade and Christine McQuade. 2010.
- Thinking in Writing: Rhetorical Patterns and Critical Response Don McQuade and Robert Atwan. 1997.
- The Winchester Reader Don McQuade and Robert Atwan. 1991
- Popular Writing in America: The Interaction of Style and Audience: Advertising, Newspapers, Magazines, Best Sellers. 1974.
