= Linda Adler-Kassner =

Writing Studies Scholar and University Administrator

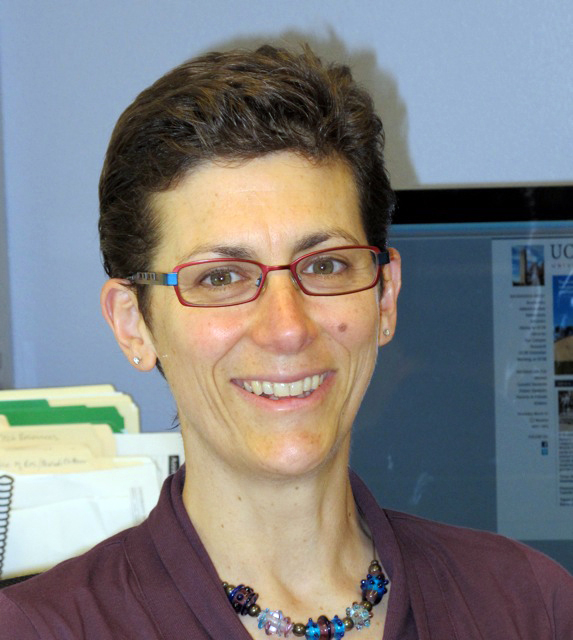
- Professor Adler-Kassner
- Known for: Research on writing program administration, basic writing, writing knowledge transfer
- Awards: Council of Writing Program Administrators’ Best Book Award (The Activist WPA, 2008), Council of Writing Program Administrators' Special Award for Outstanding Scholarship (Naming What We Know, 2015)

Academic background
- Education: Ph.D.: University of Minnesota M.A.: University of Minnesota B.A.: Macalester College

Academic work
- Discipline: Writing Studies
- Institutions: University of California, Santa Barbara

Linda Adler-Kassner is an educator and university administrator. She is known for her work in the field of writing studies, including co-authoring Naming What We Know: Threshold Concepts of Writing Studies, which was recognized by the Council of Writing Program Administrators.

== Education and career ==
Adler-Kassner received her B.A. from Macalester College in 1985. She earned her M.A. in 1992 and she received her Ph.D. from the University of Minnesota in 1995. Adler-Kassner had taught at the University of Michigan-Dearborn and Eastern Michigan University. From 2009–2015, she served as director of the University of California, Santa Barbara's Writing Program. As of 2022, she is the faculty director of the Center for Innovative Teaching, Research, and Learning (CITRAL), a professor of writing studies, and Associate Vice Chancellor at the University of California, Santa Barbara.

From 2009 to 2011, Adler-Kassner was president of the Council of Writing Program Administrators. While serving in this role, she Framework for Success in Postsecondary Writing, a policy document used by institutions and writing programs to guide writing pedagogy.

In 2017, she chaired the Conference on College Composition and Communication.

== Research ==
Adler-Kassner's research areas broadly include literacy studies with attention to inclusive pedagogies. Her work includes the nature of writing as a learning method and process of discovery. Recent research, as published in her two Naming What We Know books, has focused on the disciplinary knowledge of composition studies, threshold concepts, writing knowledge transfer, genre studies, and reflective writing. Additionally, Naming What We Know has contributed to new developments in information literacy and the practical application of threshold concepts across disciplines. Earlier in her career, Adler-Kassner's scholarship covered topics such as basic writing and community literacy.

== Selected publications ==
- Adler-Kassner, Linda; Crooks, Robert; Watters, Ann (1997). Writing the Community: Concepts and Models for Service-learning in Composition. Stylus Publishing. ISBN 978-1-56377-006-7. OCLC 671395202.
- Goodman, Lorie J. (1998). "Just Serving/Just Writing". Composition Studies. 26 (1): 59–71. JSTOR 43501399.
- Adler-Kassner, Linda (2008). The Activist WPA: Changing Stories About Writing and Writers. University Press of Colorado. ISBN 978-0-87421-700-1. OCLC 609416203.
- Lamos, Steve (2008). "Review of The Activist WPA: Changing Stories About Writing and Writers" (PDF). Reflections: 322–326.
- Olson, Wendy (2009). "Review of The Activist WPA: Changing Stories About Writing and Writers". Composition Studies. 37 (2): 135–137. JSTOR 43501777.
- Rose, Shirley (2012). "The WPA Within: WPA Identities and Implications for Graduate Education in Rhetoric and Composition". College English. 75 (2): 218–230. JSTOR 24238140.
- Adler-Kassner, Linda; Majewski, John; Koshnick, Damian (2012). "The Value of Troublesome Knowledge: Transfer and Threshold Concepts in Writing and History". Composition Forum. 26.
- Adler-Kassner, Linda; Wardle, Elizabeth (2015). Naming What We Know: Threshold Concepts of Writing Studies. Utah State University Press. ISBN 978-0-87421-989-0. OCLC 895302988.
- Stanton, Courtney (March 2017). "Book review: Naming what we know: threshold concepts of writing studies, Linda Adler-Kassner & Elizabeth Wardle (Eds.)". Journal of Pedagogic Development. 7 (1): 28–29. hdl:10547/622062.
- Adler-Kassner, Linda; Wardle, Elizabeth (2020). (Re)Considering What We Know: Learning Thresholds in Writing, Composition, Rhetoric, and Literacy. University Press of Colorado. ISBN 978-1-60732-932-9. OCLC 1122688913.

== Awards and honors ==
- Council of Writing Program Administrators - Special Award for Outstanding Scholarship (2016) for Naming What We Know (Utah State University Press)
- Council of Writing Program Administrators - Best Book Award (2008-2010) for The Activist WPA (Utah State University Press)
