= WAC Clearinghouse =

The WAC Clearinghouse publishes peer-reviewed, open-access journals and books of interest to both the writing-across-the-curriculum community and the larger writing studies community. It also provides a wide range of web-based resources for instructors who wish to use writing in their courses and for writers themselves. It is widely regarded as the leading website supporting the use of writing and speaking in courses across the curriculum. Writing-across-the-curriculum (WAC) refers to a formal programmatic approach within contemporary secondary and higher education composition studies that promotes the importance of writing in classes outside of composition.

The WAC Clearinghouse operates as a publishing collaborative, drawing on contributions from more than 200 individuals from six continents serving on the editorial boards of academic journals supported by the Clearinghouse, as editors or reviewers of its book series, as editors of the resources collected in its WAC Repository, and as members of the overall Clearinghouse editorial board. The open-access character of the scholarship available through the Clearinghouse book series provides free access to scholarly monographs, edited collections, conference proceedings, and textbooks, providing students and teachers with an alternative to purchasing scholarly and classroom instructional materials. For individuals and libraries who wish to own print copies of its books, the Clearinghouse works with the University Press of Colorado and Parlor Press to make print books available in low-cost editions. The Clearinghouse also collaborates with other publishers and professional organizations in the field of writing studies, including the National Council of Teachers of English, the Conference on College Composition and Communication, the Association for Writing Across the Curriculum, Parlor Press, and Writing Spaces.

== History and Resources ==
Established in 1997, the Clearinghouse is among the most successful open-access publishing projects in the humanities.

Journals. The Clearinghouse publishes 12 active academic journals, including

- Across the Disciplines, devoted to language, learning and academic writing;
- Academic Labor: Research and Artistry, which addresses matters relating to tenure and contingency in the academy;
- Double Helix, an international journal on writing, critical thinking, pedagogical theory and classroom practice;
- Journal of Writing Analytics, which focuses on the study of writing processes and written texts through a wide range of analytical tools;
- Literate Activity, which publishes innovative scholarship that reflects the complexities of how people create, use, and act-with texts across lifeworlds;
- Open Words: Access and English Studies, which publishes articles focusing on political, professional, and pedagogical issues within writing studies;
- The Peer Review, an open-access, multimodal, scholarly journal that promotes the work of emerging writing center researchers;
- Peitho: Journal of the Coalition of Feminist Scholars, which publishes original research in the history of rhetoric and composition;
- Prompt: A Journal of Academic Writing Assignments, which publishes academic writing assignments accompanied by reflective essay;
- Revista Latinoamericana de Estudios de la Escritura, which publishes articles on writing in Spanish, Portuguese, or English.
- The WAC Journal, focused on WAC theory and ideas; and
- WLN: A Journal of Writing Center Scholarship, which promotes exchanges on challenges related to writing center pedagogy and leadership.

In addition, the Clearinghouse serves as the online home for The Journal of Basic Writing and provides access to the archives of twelve journals that no longer publish, including RhetNet, an online journal of rhetoric and composition that explores what "net" publishing may be in its natural form and Language and Learning Across the Disciplines.

Books. The Clearinghouse has published more than 175 original scholarly monographs and collections and has made more than 75 out-of-print books available in open-access digital editions. Over the past several years, original books published by the Clearinghouse have earned best-book awards from organizations including the Conference on College Composition and Communication, the Association for Writing Across the Curriculum, and the Council of Writing Program Administrators.

Professional and Instructional Resources. Through its WAC Repository, the Clearinghouse provides access to peer-reviewed resources for teachers who wish to use writing in courses across the disciplines, including collections addressing the use of generative AI and chatbots in writing instruction, an exhibit on the landmark 1966 Dartmouth Conference, a bibliography (published in collaboration with CompPile, which became part of the Clearinghouse in 2018, see below), resource pages for writers and writing instructors, conference proceedings, a list of scholarly journals, and the Statement on WAC Principles and Practices, among others.

CompPile and TCBib Databases. The Clearinghouse is also home to the CompPile database, a freely available searchable database of published scholarship in post-secondary composition and rhetoric from 1939 to the present. Founded in 2001 by Rich Haswell and Glenn Blaclock, its coverage of work from 1939 to 1999 is especially comprehensive. It is also home to the TCBib database, which was developed by Avon Murphy. TCBib joined the Clearinghouse in 2026.

Three Decades of Operation. On March 14, 2022, the Clearinghouse celebrated the 25th anniversary of its founding. Since mid-2001, when it began keeping web stats, the Clearinghouse has seen more than 45 million downloads of PDF and ePub documents (as article, complete books, and book chapters). More than 9.5 million downloads were recorded in the twelve months. These numbers do not include downloads made through library catalogs, institutional repositories, full-text databases, and learning management systems.

Transition to a 501(c)(3) Nonprofit Organization. The Clearinghouse was established at Colorado State University in 1997. In 2024, recognizing that leadership changes would occur in the coming years as its founder moved into retirement, the Clearinghouse registered itself as an independent nonprofit organization. It subsequently transitioned its financial operations from Colorado State University and, in 2025, launched a new website on an independent server, using the URL wacclearinghouse.org. In 2026, two new publishers were appointed by the Clearinghouse editorial board, Christopher Basgier and Heather Falconer, joining founder Mike Palmquist, who will step down from that role in 2027.

== Sustainable Publishing Initiative ==
In May 2012, to mark its fifteenth year of operation, the WAC Clearinghouse launched the 25 Collective, a demonstration project for sustainable publishing. The goal of the project was to publish 25 new books for a total expenditure of $50,000―a cost far below that borne by traditional academic presses. Leveraging university resources (office space, computing resources, and web servers), the project operated within its budget and had, by March 2017, reached its goal, producing 29 books at an average cost of less than $2,000 per book. The success of the project led to the launch of the Colorado State University Open Press, a publishing project that supported the use of the publishing collaborative model developed through the WAC Clearinghouse in other disciplines. The Open Press ceased operation in 2021 following changes in university leadership.

== Support ==
The Clearinghouse was hosted by Colorado State University from its founding in 1997 until 2025. During that period, in-kind support was provided by the Department of English, the Division of Information Technology, the Office of the Provost, the Institute for Learning and Teaching, the Division of Continuing Education, and the university's Morgan Library.

Funding for the Clearinghouse is provided through donations to the WAC Clearinghouse as well as from sales of low-cost print editions of its open-access scholarly books. Donations are used to cover costs associated with copy editing, journal and book design and production, web hosting, the purchase of ISBN numbers and registration of Digital Object Identifiers (DOIs), and software purchases. Interested patrons my donate online or by check through the Clearinghouse website.
