= Min-Zhan Lu =

Min-Zhan Lu is a composition professor and scholar. She serves as professor emerita of English at the University of Louisville. She is the 2005 recipient of the Conference on College Composition and Communication (CCCC) Richard M. Braddock Award and the 2012 CCCC Outstanding Book Award.

== Early life and education ==
Lu grew up in China at the turn of the Communist Revolution in the mid to late 1940s. She grew up speaking Shanghai dialect, Standard Chinese, and English at a young age. She learned Standard Chinese while attending a private school after the Communist Revolution in 1949.

Lu was awarded her MA and PhD at the University of Pittsburgh in 1983 and 1989 respectively, where she studied in the Cultural and Critical Studies Program. During her PhD program, she served as an Andrew W. Mellon Predoctoral Fellow (1987–1988).

== Career and research ==
As a non-native English speaker, Lu did not intend on becoming a composition teacher after completing her PhD. While searching for jobs, she found that this was one of the only options available to her. After becoming a TA for a writing studies course at the University of Pittsburgh, she became interested in how composition studies examines the experiences of those with nontraditional schooling and how the pedagogy treated reading and writing as connected.

After completing her TA position, Lu briefly lectured at Des Moines Area Community College. She went on to teach at Drake University for over ten years (1989–2001) holding several positions including Endowed Professor of the Humanities. She went on to teach and direct several programs within rhetoric and composition at the University of Wisconsin-Milwaukee for five years (2001–2006). She has spent the majority of her teaching career at the University of Louisville, where she is currently serving as Professor Emerita since 2014.

== Selected works ==
- Lu, Min-Zhan, and Bruce Horner. "Introduction: Translingual Work." College English, vol. 78, no. 3, 2016, pp. 207–218.
- Lu, Min-Zhan, and Bruce Horner. "Translingual Literacy, Language Difference, and Matters of Agency." College English, vol. 75, no. 6, 2013, pp. 582–607.
- Lu, Min-Zhan, and Bruce Horner. "Composing in a Global-Local Context: Careers, Mobility, Skills." College English, vol. 72, no. 2, 2009, pp. 113–133.
- Lu, Min-Zhan. "Living-English Work." College English, vol. 68, no. 6, 2006, pp. 605–618.
- Lu, Min-Zhan. "An Essay on the Work of Composition: Composing English against the Order of Fast Capitalism." College Composition and Communication, vol. 56, no. 1, 2004, pp. 16–50.
- Lu, Min-Zhan. "Articles - Redefining the Literate Self: The Politics of Critical Affirmation." College Composition and Communication, vol. 51, no. 2, 1999, p. 172–194.

== Notable awards ==
- 2012 CCCC Outstanding Book Award (Cross-Language Communications in Composition)
- 2005 CCCC Richard Braddock Award ("An Essay on the Work of Composition: Composing English against the Order of Fast Capitalism")
- 1992 Mina P. Shaughnessy Award for Best Article Published in the Journal of Basic Writing
