= Monica Hesse =

American journalist and author

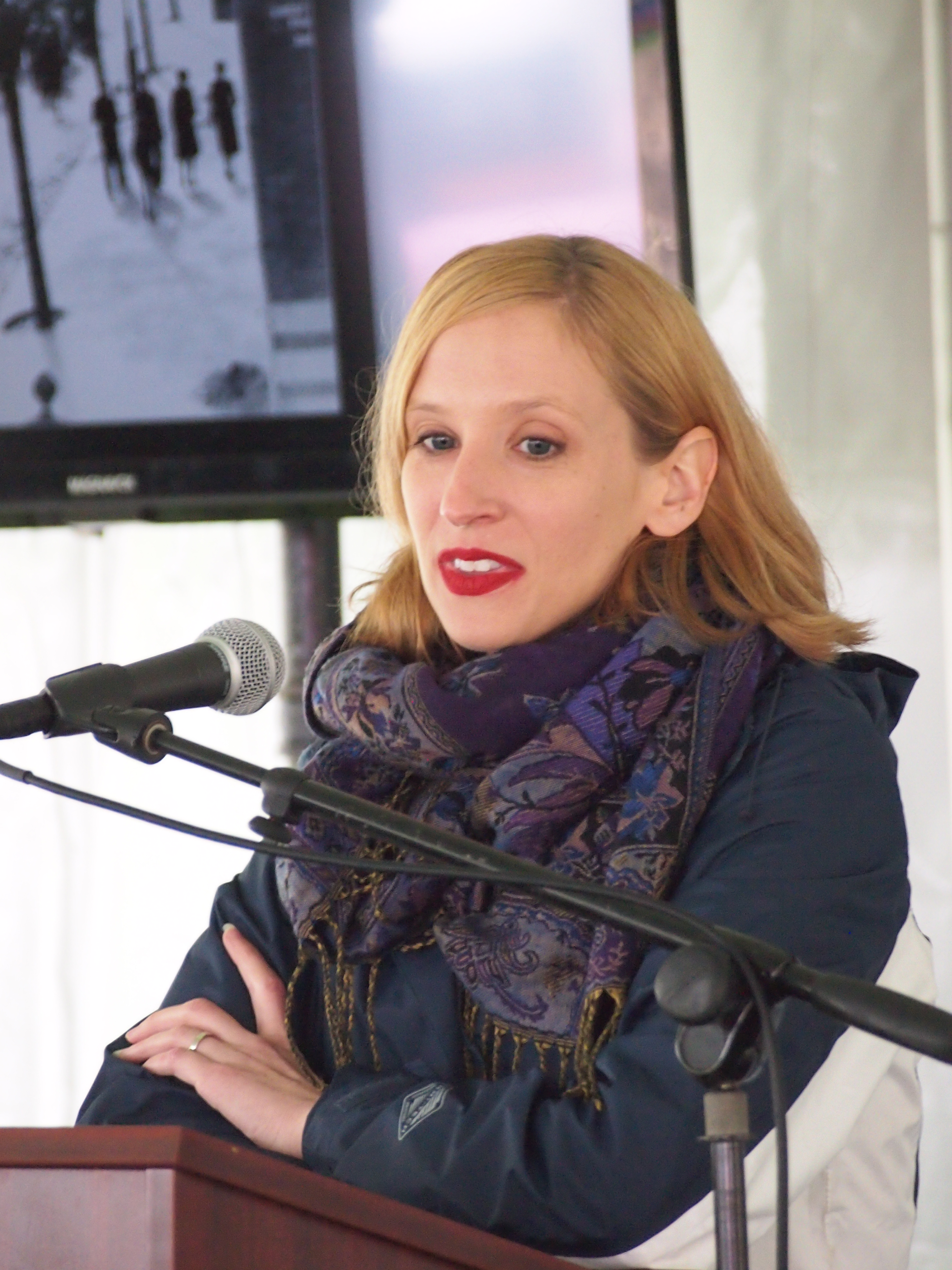
- Hesse in 2016
- Education: Bryn Mawr College (BA); Johns Hopkins University (MA)
- Occupations: Journalist, novelist
- Writing career
- Genres: Non-fiction, young adult fiction
- Website: www.monicahesse.com

Monica Hesse (born 1981 or 1982) is an American journalist and author. She is a screens critic for The Washington Post and a 2023 finalist for the Pulitzer Prize.

== Early life and education ==
Hesse is from Normal, Illinois, where her father, Douglas D. Hesse, taught writing at Illinois State University. Her mother is a therapist.

She attended Bryn Mawr College, where she wrote a column for The Bi-College News and majored in English. She graduated in 2003. In 2009, she earned a master's degree in nonfiction writing from Johns Hopkins University.

== Career ==
During Hesse's junior year of college, she interned at AARP: The Magazine, an experience that led to a full-time job at the publication after she graduated. She moved to Washington, D.C. and began taking freelance assignments for The Washington Post and the tabloid On Tap.

In 2007, Hesse interned for the Post's Style section, later becoming a permanent feature writer. In 2018, she was appointed the newspaper's first ever gender columnist.

In January 2025, the Post scrapped the paper's "gender columnist" role and reassigned Hesse from the Style/Power section to the Opinions section after Post editors killed an article recently submitted by her. This change was confirmed by Hesse herself in an article she wrote in March 2025.

In late September or early October 2025, Hesse was again reassigned, this time as "a screens critic" for the Style section.

Hesse is the author of several novels, with a focus on the World War II era. Her 2017 book American Fire reports on a string of arsons in Accomack County, Virginia.

== Awards ==
Hesse is the recipient of the Edgar Award for Best Young Adult Mystery for her book Girl in the Blue Coat and the Society for Feature Journalism's Narrative Storytelling award. She was a finalist for the Pulitzer Prize for Commentary, "for columns that convey the anger and dread that many Americans felt about losing their right to abortion after the Supreme Court overturned Roe v. Wade."

== Personal life ==
Hesse lives in University Park, Maryland with her family.

== Works ==
- 2016 – Girl in the Blue Coat
- 2017 – American Fire: Love, Arson, and Life in a Vanishing Land
- 2018 – The War Outside
- 2020 – They Went Left
- 2024 – The Brightwood Code
