= Anne Ruggles Gere =

American academic

- Education: Colby College (BA); Colgate University (MA); University of Michigan (PhD)
- Scientific career
- Awards: Regents Award for Distinguished Public Service (2006, University of Michigan), Spencer Foundation Fellowship (2001, National Academy of Education), Making American Literatures Project (1997, National Endowment for the Humanities)
- Fields: English; Education; Rhetoric; Composition
- Workplaces: University of Washington; University of Michigan
- Thesis: West African Oratory And The Fiction Of Chinua Achebe And T. M. Aluko (1974)
- Website: sites.google.com/umich.edu/anne-ruggles-gere/curriculum-vitae

Anne Ruggles Gere (also known as Anne Gere) is an American scholar in the field of language education and literacy. She has published on topics such as the history of writing groups, best practices in literacy education, and integration of culturally responsive pedagogy.

Ruggles Gere has served as president of the Modern Language Association., National Council of Teachers of English, and the Conference on College Composition and Communication. Additionally, she has served as the chair of University of Michigan's Joint Program in English and Education since 1988, participating in over 100 dissertation committees, many of whom have built on her research.

She is the Arthur F. Thurnau Collegiate professor of English and the Gertrude Buck Professor of Education at the University of Michigan, and her academic research has focused on the evolution of writing groups, the history of women's clubs, and writing pedagogy. Her research examines how literacy practices in women's clubs empowered active collaboration—juxtaposing with common characterizations of writers as solitary and women as disempowered. She asserts that clubwomen engaged in social, economic, and political issues that shaped the nation.

In 2018, she was awarded the Distinguished Professor of the Year for all public post-secondary education in the state of Michigan. Her research has been funded by grants from the Mellon Foundation, the National Science Foundation, Humanities Collaboratory, as well as the Department of Education. Additionally, she has received awards from Spencer Foundation from the National Academy of Education, National Women's Studies Association, and the National Endowment for the Humanities. In 2025, Gere was awarded the CCCC Exemplar Award from the Conference on College Composition and Communication.

== Research ==
=== Writing groups ===
Ruggles Gere's research explores the social dimension of writing groups and aims to expand the concept of writing beyond solo performances and academic writing. She explores these aspects of writing groups in her books, Writing Groups: History, Theory and Implications, Kitchen tables and rented rooms: The extracurriculum of composition and Intimate practices: Literacy and cultural work in US women's clubs, 1880-1920. This research has been discussed and adopted into additional work by Ken Hyland and Keith James Topping.

=== Literacy education ===
Gere's research also examines sites of literacy education in the United States. This work overlaps with her archival research of writing groups, as writing groups were often cites of literacy education. In addition to her archival research of historic sites of literacy education, she outline modern literacy education in her MLA-published edited collection Into the Field: Sites of Composition Studies in a manner similar to Deborah Brandt. This book defines composition studies through its interdisciplinary relationships with rhetoric, literary theory, and linguistics. As a whole, the book positions writing studies as a field that teaches cultural practices rather than valid or invalid syntax as promoted in formal grammar by Noam Chomsky.

== Leadership ==
=== Modern Language Association ===
Anne Ruggles Gere served as the president for the Modern Language Association in the year 2018. She was preceded by Diana Taylor and succeeded by Simon Gikandi. Her term was highlighted by three main themes: combating systemic abuse of junior faculty, adapting MLA to the waning enrollment in English courses, and emphasizing public humanities

She addressed and combatted the systemic abuses of power that have harmed students and junior faculty members. Her presidency moved MLA to take steps to address these issues by devoting open discussions at conventions to power dynamics on campus and creating a page on its website for anonymous discussion of abusive mentoring practices.

=== National Council of Teachers of English ===
Ruggles Gere was president of the National Council of Teachers of English for the years 2000-2001. She was succeeded by Cultural Literacy scholar Leila Christenbury and preceded by Whole Language researcher Jerome Harste. During her tenure, the organization hosted two conferences with themes such as "Teaching Matters," and "Re-Creating the Classroom."

=== Conference on College Composition and Communication ===
Anne Ruggles Gere was the Chair of the Conference on College Composition and Communication for the year 1993. That year they held their conference in San Diego, California with the theme, “Twentieth Century Problems, Twenty-First Century Solutions: Issues, Answers, Actions”.

== Awards and distinctions ==
Throughout her tenure, Anne Ruggles Gere has received awards and distinctions for her scholarship and leadership. In 2019, she received the Provost's Teaching Innovation Prize at University of Michigan. The previous year, she was awarded the Distinguished Professor of the Year by the Michigan Association of State Universities. In 2001, she received a research award from the International Center for Research on Women. Additionally, she was the recipient of an award from the Technology Assisted Teacher Education (TATE) Project for the Computerworld Smithsonian Program. In 2025, Gere was the recipient of the Exemplar Award from the Conference on College Composition and Communication.
