= Students' Right to Their Own Language =

Educational policy

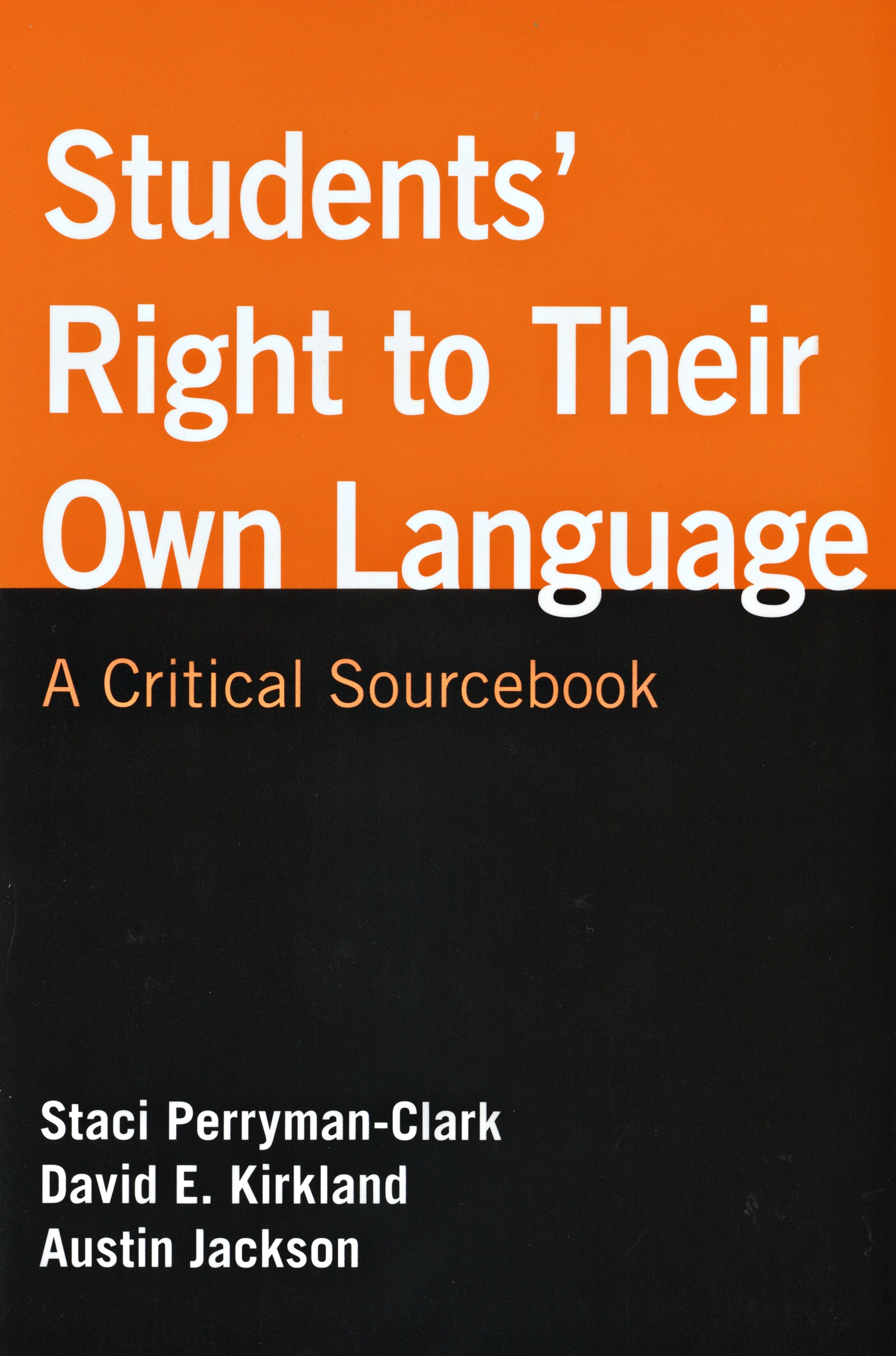
- Author: NCTE
- Publication date: 1974; 2015

"Students' Right to Their Own Language" (SRTOL) is a resolution adopted by the Conference on College Composition and Communication (CCCC) which was also later published in a special issue of the journal College Composition and Communication, as well as in book form, with the title Students' Right to Their Own Language: A Critical Sourcebook by MacMillan imprint Bedford/St. Martin's in cooperation with the National Council of Teachers of English (NCTE). In 1974, the CCCC released a position statement focused on "Student's Right to Their Own Language." The statement challenges the expectation that students in the United States should exclusively use Standard American English in their classwork. Arguing that it is both unjust and racist to require all students to use the Standard American Dialect, STROL acknowledges that doing so enables one social group to dominate and marginalize others. The statement also asserts that it is the duty of educators to respect diversity and help students uphold the right to their own language use. The CCCC's website organizes their position statements thematically. "Students' Right Their Own Language" falls under the theme of "Statements on Social and Linguistic and Antiracist Pedagogies."

== History ==
=== Development and adoption ===
Progressive social movements shaped the development and political significance of the resolution. The SRTOL resolution, approved in 1974, was initially a response to the increasing diversification of the student body in higher education. With the implementation of 'open admissions' policies, universities saw a surge in students from diverse backgrounds, particularly international students. Traditional writing courses are now often employed as an institutional response to 'standard challenges. However, the political resonance of the SRTOL was also undeniably linked to 1960s progressive activism and such activism elevated the concern for protecting a student's language into the broader realm of class politics.

=== Reaffirmation and revisions ===
Originally adopted in 1974, the SRTOL resolution was revised and reaffirmed in 2003 by the CCCC. The 2003 CCCC called for schools and teachers to respect students' linguistic diversity and take it as "both a right and a resource." In 2008, in an anthology titled Affirming Students' Right to Their Own Language: Bridging Language Policies and Pedagogical Practice, editors described the STROL resolution as an "unfinished business," as (1) teachers can employ a variety of pedagogical techniques in classroom practices to help maintain students' linguistic rights, (2) more research can be conducted to study how language policies frustrate students' access to their own languages, and (3) more work can be done to learn from other countries' language policies on how they acknowledge and protect linguistic diversity.Entering the 21st century, with the rise of artificial intelligence and large language models, SRTOL has been reactivated. Issues like SRTOL call for resisting linguistic homogenization in digital environments and embracing multilingualism. A handful of universities, including the University of South Florida, have developed "multicultural scoring standards" that treat grammatical errors in "Standard American English" as stylistic choices rather than mistakes.

The resolution was re-published as a book entitled Students' Right to Their Own Language: A Critical Sourcebook by NCTE in 2015. The resolution has also been revisited in relation to code meshing, particularly in discussions of linguistic diversity in writing instruction.

== Major themes ==
The resolution's primary argument is that, in the context of academic writing, students have a right to their own linguistic varieties, whether it be the dialect of their upbringing or one they adopt later in life. Language, according to the resolution, is connected to culture and self-esteem, and that educational practices should respect this connection. Scholars have argued against the myth of language homogeneity in writing and composition. Scholars have also linked the use of language to one's linguistic identity in writing instruction. The resolution strongly affirms the students' right to use their own language patterns and varieties, including the dialects of their nurture or any dialects in which they find their identity and style. It is grounded in the finding by language scholars that "the myth of a standard American dialect has no validity." The resolution asserts that claiming any one dialect is unacceptable is an attempt by one social group to dominate another, and that such a claim offers false and "immoral advice for humans". It advocates that a nation proud of its diverse heritage must preserve its heritage of dialects. Therefore, teachers must have the training and experience necessary to respect this diversity and uphold the students' right to their own language.Furthermore, the shift in language justice philosophy from a deficit-oriented perspective to one of empowerment enables students to actively choose linguistic styles rather than strictly adhere to normative standards.

== Criticism ==
One of the impacts of SRTOL has been criticized to be the emphasis on "process pedagogy" a teaching method that considers all English dialects to be "equally valid" for written communication in both academic and professional arenas. Some scholars have also noted complications with code-meshing approaches.

=== Early reactions ===
In an opinion piece appearing in The New York Times in 1974, J. Mitchel Morse critiques the Statement's downplaying of surface-level features by imitating a hypothetical students' prose full of errors.

== Writing Center Practices ==
SRTOL also transformed the role of writing center consultants into conduits for cultural information to students unfamiliar with academic conventions. For instance, writers from Appalachia are often perceived as underrepresented due to their cultural identity and linguistic style, frequently equated with singular white cultural characteristics. For such students, a blend of directive and non-directive coaching may be necessary. While traditional non-interventionist coaching remains popular, directive feedback grounded in academic terminology creates greater learning opportunities for students unfamiliar with academic writing conventions.

== Related resolutions and statements ==
The CCCC has expanded its claims about "Students' Right to Their Own Language" through the introduction of another idea surrounding academics in language, which is the idea of "White Language Supremacy" (WLS). The CCCC wrote a position statement on this topic as well. The introduction of "White Language Supremacy" is a supporting argument as to why students deserve Right to their own language. WLS as an argument also affirms the CCCC's belief that standard American dialect is inherently racist; this sentiment was brought up in their 1974 position statement. The CCCC's argument throughout the statement focuses on normalized "White Language Supremacy." The statement then goes on to say that WLS is a tool for white supremacy as it defines and evaluates ideas, writing, rhetoric, and pedagogies. The WLS definitions of these topics can be harmful and predatory to students. The CCCC argues that it teaches students that their own language and background is not a valid or proper manner of communication and that it does not belong in academia.

Asao B. Inoue, CCCC chair in 2019, reflected and expanded on both "student's right to their own language" and "white language supremacy." Inoue's speech as CCCC chair touches on points that contribute to the conversation about "students' right to their own language." Inoue argued that educational racism has been powered by white supremacy and its manifestation in language and education. He further echoes the sentiments from the 1974 position statement that white supremacy has seeped into the inner workings and foundation of language and education. Inoue's claims through his definition of normalized white supremacy, that it has put students of color in a cage and has not allowed them to succeed and flourish in academia, as their language is not considered to be proper.

In June 2021, the CCCC created a position statement that reflected on the teacher duties from the 1974 position statement entitled, "This Ain't Another Statement! This is a DEMAND for Black Linguistic Justice!" This statement is written in African American Vernacular English and includes a list of demands that teachers must abide by. This includes; 1. Teachers must stop perpetuating the idea that academic language should be the communicative norm. 2. Teachers must stop encouraging code-switching and teach about white language supremacy. 3. Teachers must create a safe environment for politics, and activism in the classroom. 4. Teachers must develop Black Linguistic Consciousness in order to decolonize their mind and classroom. 5. Black dispositions are centered in the research and teaching of Black Language! This statement expands the role of the teacher from the 1974 position statement, as it shows how teachers can support Black Linguistic Justice while also attempting to shame teachers who were not supporting it. Through its demands and strong words, this statement communicates that students of color have been conditioned to think that academia and education is not a suitable place for their culture and background, which also echoes the original 1974 statement.

== See also ==
- Language policy
- Ebonics
