= David Bartholomae =

American professor in composition studies (1947–2023)

- Born: April 20, 1947
- Died: April 4, 2023 (aged 75)
- Awards: ADE/MLA Francis Andrew March Award, CCCC Exemplar Award, MLA Mina Shaughnessy Award

Academic background
- Education: Rutgers University

Academic work
- Main interests: Composition studies
- Notable works: Writing on the Margins: Essays on Composition and Teaching, The Teaching of Writing: The Eighty fifth Yearbook of the National Society for the Study of Education, Facts, Artifacts and Counterfacts: Reading and Writing in Theory and Practice

David John Bartholomae (April 20, 1947 – April 4, 2023) was an American scholar in composition studies. He received his PhD from Rutgers University in 1975 and was a Professor of English and former Chair of the English Department at the University of Pittsburgh. His primary research interests are in composition, literacy, and pedagogy, and his work engages scholarship in rhetoric and in American literature/American Studies. His articles and essays have appeared in publications such as PMLA, Critical Quarterly, and College Composition and Communication.

Bartholomae was also the co-editor, with Jean Ferguson Carr, of the University of Pittsburgh Press Series in Composition, Literacy, and Culture, a leading list of monographs in the field. Bartholomae served on the Executive Council of the Modern Language Association and as president of the Conference on College Composition and Communication and president of the Association of Departments of English. In 1985, Bartholomae was the Chair of CCCC, where he gave his CCCC Chair's Address "Freshman English, Composition, and CCCC.”

== "Inventing the University" ==
One of Bartholomae's most renowned claims, that the acquisition of academic discourse should be a primary ingredient of any first-year writing course, is argued in his widely recognized essay, "Inventing the University". Throughout his essay, known as perhaps one of the most cited and influential in the field of composition, Bartholomae (1986) suggests that when college students write, they learn to communicate with academic communities by assembling and mimicking the language found within the scholarly world; that is, students must discover the idiosyncratic ways of knowing, selecting, evaluating, reporting, concluding, and arguing that define the discourse of the post-secondary community (p. 403).

Bartholomae (1986), however, admitted to the difficulty of such a task; in fact, he stated it is difficult for basic writers "to take on the role – the voice, the person – of an authority whose authority is rooted in scholarship, analysis, or research" (p. 405). The solution to this problem, Bartholomae (1986) suggested, is for writers to "build bridges" (p. 407) between themselves and their target audience. In order to successfully manipulate readers, writers must be able to find common ground with their audience before moving to more controversial arguments; moreover, to better accommodate their audience, advanced writers not only find common ground with their readers, but also understand their position and knowledge.

Bartholomae's book, "Like What We Imagine: Writing and the University", returns to the place of student writing in the university curriculum. In his introduction to the book he says: "This is an end-of-career book, a collection of late essays that reflect on the teaching of reading and writing, on the challenges and value of students' work, and on the place of English in the university curriculum. The chapters are unified by a thread that connects some of the books and ideas, people and places, students and courses that have shaped and sustained my work as a scholar and teacher over time."

== "The Study of Error" ==
Throughout "The Study of Error", Bartholomae (1980) expounds upon the idea that basic writers must be able to "transcribe and manipulate the code of written discourse" in order to develop expert abilities (p. 268). Bartholomae (1980) begins his argument by citing Mina Shaughnessy's claim that if teachers of composition are to help students develop their writing skills, they must first understand why basic writers make certain mistakes (p. 254). He asserts that the mistakes of basic writers are intentional, catalyzed by a deficient understanding of, and inability to properly identify, how academic language sounds (Bartholomae, 1980, p. 263). Therefore, similar to his claims set forth in "Inventing the University", Bartholomae again suggests that instead of attempting to fix errors via drills and practice sentences, basic writers must learn to understand the code of written discourse, and mimic the voice of the language found within the academic community.

== Debate with Peter Elbow ==
Some of Bartholomae's claims have created controversy among colleagues. Most notably, Bartholomae engaged Peter Elbow in a long public debate regarding the role of the university-level student writer. Specifically, at the 1989 and 1991 meetings of the Conference on College Composition and Communication, Bartholomae and Elbow initiated a prominent discussion regarding personal and academic writing, one which spilled over into the pages of academic journals and was taken up by additional scholars in subsequent years. While both Bartholomae and Elbow agree that training for academic writing should be an integral component of any student's undergraduate journey, they disagree with exactly how the training should be implemented.

As a trailblazing social constructionist, Bartholomae's scholarship hinges upon the notion of discourse communities and makes suggestions on how students should enter the academic discourse community; contrary to Elbow, he claims that teachers play a vital role in student development, as they construct assignments that allow pupils to mimic the voice(s) within academic discourse. While Bartholomae asserts that writers must first prove their worth by mimicking the language used throughout discourse communities and argues more power should be given to teachers, Elbow claims just the opposite. As evidenced in Writing Without Teachers, Elbow's scholarship suggests that writing belongs to the writer from the beginning, arguing that students learn by writing without teachers – citing diaries, letters, personal narratives, and poems as examples of his theory (p. 145).

Over the years, the two scholars have concluded their debate by essentially agreeing to disagree. In fact, in "Being a Writer vs. Being an Academic: A Conflict in Goals", an essay published in a 1995 issue of the journal College Composition and Communication, Elbow writes: "this is what we academics do: carry on an unending conversation not just with colleagues but with the dead and unborn" (p. 79).

== Death ==
Bartholomae died at his Shadyside home in Pittsburgh, Pennsylvania, on April 4, 2023, from head and neck cancer. He was 75.

== Books ==
- Like What We Imagine: Writing and the University. (University of Pittsburgh Press, 2021).
- Writing on the Margins: Essays on Composition and Teaching (Hardcover: Palgrave/Macmillan; Softcover: Bedford/St. Martins), 2005.
- The Teaching of Writing: The Eighty fifth Yearbook of the National Society for the Study of Education, ed. with Anthony R. Petrosky (Chicago: NSSE and The University of Chicago Press, 1986).
- Facts, Artifacts and Counterfacts: Reading and Writing in Theory and Practice, with Anthony R. Petrosky (Montclair, NJ: Boynton/Cook, 1986).

Textbooks

- Ways of Reading: Words and Images, with Anthony R. Petrosky (Boston: Bedford Books, 2003).
- Reading the Lives of Others: History and Ethnography, with Anthony R. Petrosky (Boston: Bedford Books, 1994).
- Ways of Reading: An Anthology for Writers, with Anthony R. Petrosky (Boston: Bedford Books, 1987). Seven editions.

== Awards ==
- 2008: ADE/MLA Francis Andrew March Award
- 2006: CCCC Exemplar Award
- 2005: MLA Mina Shaughnessy Award, for Writing on the Margins
- 2003–2006: Executive Committee and President-Elect, ADE
- 1997–2002: Executive Council, Modern Language Association
- 1995: Chancellor’s Distinguished Teaching Award
- 1992: Distinguished Alumnus, Ohio Wesleyan University
- 1987: Distinguished Achievement Award, Educational Press Association of America
- 1985–1989: Chair, Conference on College Composition and Communication (officer’s rotation)
- 1982: Fulbright Lecturer (Universidad de Deusto)
- 1980: Richard B. Braddock Award
