= Jacqueline Jones Royster =

Educator and scholar

- Born: Greensboro, Georgia
- Known for: Rhetoric and race, cultural studies
- Awards: CCCC Braddock Award, MLA Mina P. Shaughnessy Prize, CCCC Exemplar Award, MLA Frances Andrew March Award

Academic background
- Education: University of Michigan, Spelman College

Academic work
- Discipline: English studies
- Institutions: Ohio State University, Georgia Institute of Technology, Spelman College

Jacqueline Jones Royster is an American academic, author, and scholar of rhetoric, literacy, and cultural studies. She is a professor at the Georgia Institute of Technology and the former Dean of the Ivan Allen College of Liberal Arts from 2010 to 2019. Royster’s work often centers on the experiences and literacy practices of African American women within rhetorical history and Black feminist theory.

== Education and career ==
Royster earned a B.A. in English from Spelman College in 1970. She has a D.A. (1975) and an M.A. (1971) in English and Linguistics from the University of Michigan.

She began her academic career teaching English at Spelman College and later at The Ohio State University. Royster taught English at Ohio State University and Spelman College. In 2010, she moved to Georgia Tech, where she served as Dean of the Ivan Allen College of Liberal Arts until 2019. She has held several leadership roles, including the 1995 Chair of the Conference on College Composition and Communication. After stepping down as dean, Royster continued at Georgia Tech and is now a professor emerita in the School of Literature, Media, and Communication.

== Professional contributions ==
Royster’s research and writing focus on African American women’s rhetoric, literacy, and social change. She has authored and co-authored several influential books. Notably, Traces of a Stream: Literacy and Social Change among African American Women examines the history of Black women’s literacy and its role in community activism. She also co-edited Southern Horrors and Other Writings: The Anti-Lynching Campaign of Ida B. Wells, 1892–1900 in 1997. Royster’s later works include Profiles of Ohio Women, 1803–2003 and the co-authored Feminist Rhetorical Practices: New Horizons for Rhetoric, Composition, and Literacy Studies(2012). She also co-edited Calling Cards: Theory and Practice in the Study of Race, Gender, and Culture. In 2003, she co-edited a college writing textbook called Critical Inquiries: Readings on Culture and Community. Royster has contributed to education through editorial work as well, serving as a consulting writer for the Writer’s Choicetextbook series and as co-editor of the Reader’s Choice literature series for high school students.

== Black feminist scholarship ==
Royster’s scholarship is grounded in Black feminist perspectives on rhetoric and literacy. In her academic work, she often emphasizes how race, gender, and positionality shape the production and validation of knowledge. For example, in a 1990 keynote address titled “Looking from the Margins: A Tale of Curricular Reform,” Royster explicitly spoke “from her position as a black woman, scholar, administrator, and former student,” drawing on her own experiences to critique mainstream curricula. She argued that traditional academic discourse encourages a false “illusion of objectivity” that “sanitizes” scholarship by ignoring the passions and value systems underlying our thinking. Royster noted that typical academic environments still exhibit “evidence of racism, sexism, classism, and ethnocentrism,” which marginalize voices like hers. Hooks wrote that she was “amazed by the complete absence of references to work by black women in contemporary critical works” on gender and race that scholars like Royster have sought to fill. Royster’s emphasis on validating marginalized perspectives and “engaging intensely with dialectical voices” reflects a broader Black feminist aim to transform academic practice by centering voices from the margins.

Royster noted that the status of Black women “as writers of worth” was typically neutralized and their achievements devalued in mainstream culture. In Traces of a Stream, Royster challenges these omissions by documenting how Black women used literacy and writing as tools of resistance and community empowerment. For instance, she discusses figures such as Maria W. Stewart and Ida B. Wells, who authored essays against slavery and lynching. The Black press of the 1800s became an ally for these women, publishing their outspoken writings on civil rights. Royster’s research demonstrates that, despite facing the deprivations imposed by racism and sexism, African American women remained resilient and, during the late nineteenth century, were “active in numerous public spheres.” She portrays the acquisition of literacy as a moment of vitality for African American women. Consequently, Royster calls for the adoption of alternative perspectives, interpretive frameworks, and scholarly modes of representation to appropriately recognize the voices and contributions of African American women. Her approach—rooted in African American feminist scholarship—expands the scope of rhetoric and composition studies, enabling the field to more inclusively encompass a diversity of lived experiences.

== Impact and repercussions ==
Royster’s scholarship has reshaped rhetorical studies. Her book Traces of a Stream was praised as groundbreaking and won the 2001 MLA Mina P. Shaughnessy Prize. Reviewers noted it expanded the canon to include women of color. Scholars credit Royster with broadening who is studied in rhetoric: for example, Royster & Kirsch (2012) argue that feminist scholars have changed the “guiding assumptions” of research, redefining what counts as evidence and who is a subject of study. Kay Siebler (2008) similarly notes that feminist rhetoricians like Royster have “reshaped the field” by infusing composition theory with diverse perspectives.

Her influence also appears in pedagogy. In Feminist Rhetorical Practices, Royster calls for an “ethos of respect and humility” when engaging with communities traditionally neglected in research. Educators have adopted this approach: as Siebler reports, feminist teachers emphasize connecting writing to community and social issues. For instance, some instructors pair Traces of a Stream with works by authors like Toni Morrison, encouraging students to link their own stories with historical struggles. These shifts demonstrate Royster’s impact on both scholarship and teaching, as her ideas encourage more inclusive, socially engaged writing education.

== Selected publications ==
- Bell-Scott, Patricia, ed. (1992). Double stitch: black women write about mothers & daughters (3. print. ed.). Boston: Beacon Press. ISBN 978-0-8070-0910-9.
- Royster, Jacqueline Jones (1996). "When the First Voice You Hear Is Not Your Own". College Composition and Communication. 47 (1): 29–40. doi:10.2307/358272. ISSN 0010-096X. JSTOR 358272.
- Royster, Jacqueline Jones; Williams, Jean C. (1999). "History in the Spaces Left: African American Presence and Narratives of Composition Studies". College Composition and Communication. 50 (4): 563–584. doi:10.2307/358481. ISSN 0010-096X. JSTOR 358481.
  - Winner of the 2000 Conference on College Composition and Communication Richard Braddock Award
- Royster, Jacqueline Jones (2000-03-24). Traces Of A Stream: Literacy and Social Change Among African American Women. University of Pittsburgh Press. ISBN 978-0-8229-5725-6.
  - Recognized by the Modern Language Association with the Mina P. Shaughnessy Prize
- Royster, Jacqueline Jones; Wells, Ida B., eds. (2011). Southern horrors and other writings: the anti-lynching campaign of Ida B. Wells, 1892 - 1900. The Bedford series in history and culture. Boston: Bedford/St. Martin's. ISBN 978-0-312-11695-8.
- Royster, Jacqueline Jones; Kirsch, Gesa E. (2012). Feminist rhetorical practices: new horizons for rhetoric, composition, and literacy studies. Studies in rhetorics and feminisms. Carbondale: Southern Illinois University Press. ISBN 978-0-8093-3069-0.
  - Winner of the Winifred Bryan Horner Outstanding Book Award

== Awards and honors ==
In 2004 Royster received the Exemplar Award from the Conference on College Composition and Communication. In 2006 she received the Frances Andrew March Award from the Modern Language Association. She was named a fellow of the Rhetoric Society of America in 2014. In 2014, she and Gesa E. Kirsch received the Winifred Bryan Horner Outstanding Book Award from the Coalition of Feminist Scholars in the History of Rhetoric & Composition (CFSHRC) for her co-authored book Feminist Rhetorical Practices: New Horizons for Rhetoric, Composition, and Literacy Studies, and she received the Global Ambassador Award from Alliance Française d'Atlanta. In 2024, she received an honorable mention for the CFSHRC Winifred Bryan Horner Outstanding Book Award for her book Making the World a Better Place: African American Women Advocates, Activists, and Leaders, 1773-1990. With Jean C. Williams, she is the recipient of the 2000 Richard Braddock Award.
