= Vershawn Ashanti Young =

American researcher of language and performance

Vershawn Ashanti Young is a scholar in Black studies, English language and writing, and communications. He specializes in three specific areas in Black studies that include masculinity, writing studies, and also performance studies. Young is the co-author of many books and multiple articles about Black studies and the importance of code-meshing.

== Education ==
Young received a Doctor of Philosophy from the University of Illinois Chicago and a Juris Doctor from the Mitchell Hamline School of Law.

== Career ==
Young was a professor at the University of Iowa and the University of Kentucky and taught in public schools. In 2026, he is currently a professor in English Language and Literature at the University of Waterloo.

Aside from being an educator, he is also a performer and an artist, most notably doing a one-man show tour called Your Average Nigga. Young has published nine books, including Your Average Nigga, in which he discusses how black men have to give up their masculinity and way of speech to sound and act whiter to get an education. In his 2018 book Other People’s English, Young distinguishes between code-switching (dialect used at school versus dialect used at home or with friends) and code-meshing (a combination of both). Specifically, he defines code-meshing as a way to combine different language styles in same medium. He also explains that language ideology is not neutral and other English varieties, specifically African American English, are treated as inferior. He also researches masculinity in this book and compares Tyler Perry to former President Barack Obama to see what performances they needed to do to be as successful as they had become. In his 2017 book, Performing Antiracist Pedagogy in Rhetoric, Writing, and Communication, Young mentions how racism can appear in classrooms and provides educators with techniques to address the stereotypes and insecurities. From Bourgeois to Boojie: Black Middle-class Performances published in 2011, Young analyzed how Black middle-class people navigate their identity and perform in United States history. His book in 2011,Code-Meshing as World English: Pedagogy, Policy, Practice, Young recognized language diversity as a resource for classrooms rather than a limitation.

In 2020, he was the chair of the Conference on College Composition and Communication.

== Publications ==
- Young, Vershawn Ashanti (2007). Your Average Nigga: Performing Race, Literacy, and Masculinity. Wayne State University Press. ISBN 978-0-814-33576-5.
- Young, Vershawn Ashanti; Martinez, Aja Y., eds. (2011). Code-Meshing as World English: Pedagogy, Policy, Performance. Urbana, Ill: National Council of Teachers of English. ISBN 978-0-8141-0700-3.
- Young, Vershawn Ashanti; Tsemo, Bridget Harris, eds. (2011). From Bourgeois to Boojie: Black Middle-Class Performances. African American life series. Detroit: Wayne State University Press. ISBN 978-0-8143-3468-3. OCLC 657270834.
- Young, Vershawn Ashanti; Barrett, Rusty; Young-Rivera, Y'Shanda; Lovejoy, Kim Brian (2013). Other People's English: Code-Meshing, Code-Switching, and African American Literacy. New York London: Teachers College Press, Columbia University. ISBN 978-1-64317-043-5.
- Oberon Garcia, Clare; Young, Vershawn Ashanti; Pimente, Charise, eds. (2014). From Uncle Tom's Cabin to The Help: Critical Perspectives on White-Authored Narratives of Black Life. Palgrave Macmillan. ISBN 978-1-137-44626-8.
- Condon, Frankie; Young, Vershawn Ashanti, eds. (2016). Performing Antiracist Pedagogy in Rhetoric, Writing, and Communication. Fort Collins, Colorado: The WAC Clearinghouse. ISBN 978-1-60732-649-6.
- Godfrey, Mollie; Young, Vershawn Ashanti, eds. (2018). Neo-Passing: Performing Identity After Jim Crow. University of Illinois Press. ISBN 978-0-252-05024-4.
- Young, Vershawn Ashanti; Robinson, Michelle Bachelor, eds. (2018). The Routledge Reader of African American Rhetoric: The Longue Duree of Black Voices. Taylor & Francis. ISBN 978-0-415-73105-8.
- Young, Vershawn Ashanti, ed. (2020). This Ain't Yesterday's Literacy: Culture and Education After George Floyd. Fountainhead Press. ISBN 978-1-644-85441-9.
