= Written Communication (journal) =

- Discipline: Communication
- Language: English
- Edited by: Dylan Dryer and Mya Poe

Publication details
- History: 1984–present
- Publisher: SAGE Publishing
- Frequency: Quarterly
- Impact factor: 2.5 (2025)

Standard abbreviations
- ISO 4: Writ. Commun.

Indexing
- ISSN: 0741-0883 (print); 1552-8472 (web)
- LCCN: 90649013
- OCLC no.: 473107382

Links
- Journal homepage; Online access; Online archive

Written Communication is a quarterly peer-reviewed academic journal that publishes papers in the field of written communication. The editors-in-chief are Dylan Dryer (University of Maine) and Mya Poe (Northeastern University). It was established in 1984 and is published by SAGE Publishing.

== Abstracting and indexing ==
The journal is abstracted and indexed in Scopus and the Social Sciences Citation Index. According to the Journal Citation Reports, the journal has a 2025 impact factor of 2.5.

== History ==
Written Communication was established in October 1984 with Stephen P. Witte and John Daly as its founding editors. While Daly ceased working with the publication in 1989, Witte remained chief editor until his death in 2004. Following Daly's departure, Witte worked alongside others at different periods of the journal's history, including Roger D. Cherry and Keith Walters of Ohio State University and Deborah Brandt and Martin Nystrand of the University of Wisconsin–Madison.

Following Witte's death from glioblastoma multiforme, his surviving wife, Christina Haas of the University of Minnesota, took over the editorship of the journal. Chad Wickman of Auburn University served as the editor-in-chief from 2017 to the end of 2022; the last issue he oversaw was published in March 2023. Since January 2023, the journal has been co-edited by Dylan Dryer (University of Maine) and Mya Poe (Northeastern University).
