= Douglas D. Hesse =

American professor of English and writer (born 1956)

Douglas Dean Hesse (born July 25, 1956) is an American professor of English and writer who has been elected leader of four national literacy organizations: president of The National Council of Teachers of English (2016), chair of the Conference on College Composition and Communication (2005), president of the Council of Writing Program Administrators, and Chair of the Association for Writing Across the Curriculum (2023). (1998–2000). In 2025, he received three Lifetime Achievement awards: from NCTE (Distinguished Service Award), MLA/ADE Francis March Award, and CWPA, Lifetime Achievement Award.

Hesse graduated from DeWitt (Iowa) Central High School, which inducted him to its Hall of Fame in 2016. He received a BA in English from the University of Iowa in 1978; an MA/W (Converted to MFA in Nonfiction) from Iowa in 1980; and a PhD from Iowa in 1986, with a dissertation The Story in the Essay. He taught at Findlay College, 1980–1983; at Illinois State University 1986-2006 (where he directed the writing program, the graduate program in English, the Center for the Advancement of Teaching, and the University Honors Program); and then the University of Denver 2006–2024, where he is professor emeritus of Writing and English and Founding Executive director of the Writing Program. He publishes primarily in the areas of creative nonfiction, writing theory and pedagogy, and writing program organization and administration.

== Books and Publications ==
- Nonfiction, The Teaching of Writing, and the Influence of Richard Lloyd Jones. co-author with Laura Julier. U Colorado P and WAC Clearinghouse, 2023.
- Creating Nonfiction, co-author with Becky Bradway (Bedford/St. Martin's, 2009 )
- Simon and Schuster Handbook for Writers (co-author with Lynn Troyka). 7th, 8th, 9th, 10, 11th ed, 2004–2017.
- Over 90 essays, articles, and chapters, including in such journals as College English, College Composition and Communication, Research in the Teaching of English, Writing on the Edge, and many others.

== Honors ==
- Distinguished Service Award. National Council of Teachers of English. November 2025.
- Francis Andrew March Award for Distinguished Service to the Profession. Association of Departments of English/Modern Language Association. January 2025.
- Lifetime Achievement Award. Council of Writing Program Administrators. July 2025.
- University of Denver Distinguished Scholar. 2012.
- Illinois State University Outstanding Researcher. 2002.
- Visiting research professor. Michigan Technological University. June, 1996.
- Wiepking Distinguished Visiting professor of English. Miami University, Oxford, OH. 2001–02.
- Donald Murray Award for Nonfiction.
- Young Rhetorician of the Year. 2015.
- Phi Beta Kappa.

== Leadership ==
- Chair. Association for Writing Across the Curriculum (AWAC).(Incoming Chair 2022, Chair 2023, Past Chair 2024)
- President. 104th President of the National Council of Teachers of English . 2016. Vice President, 2014, President Elect, 2015. Past President 2017.
- Co-director, WPA Consultant Evaluator Service. 2010–2016.
- Founder and chair, NCTE/Norman Mailer Foundation National Student Awards for Writing, 2009–2015.
- Chair (President), Conference on College Composition and Communication, 2005. At 7000+ members; nation's largest organization of writing professors. Officer from 2002 to 2006.
- Executive Committee. National Council of Teachers of English. 2003–06.
- President, National Council of Writing Program Administrators. 1999–2001.
- Editor, WPA: Writing Program Administration, 1994–1998.
- Chair, Executive Committee of MLA Division on Teaching as a Profession. 2007.
