= Cooling out =

Attitude adjustment for students

Cooling out is an informal set of practices used by colleges, especially two-year, junior, and community colleges, to handle students whose lack of academic ability or other resources prevent them from achieving the educational goals they have developed for themselves such as attaining a bachelor's degree. The purpose of cooling out is to encourage the students to adjust their expectations or redefine failure. The practices contrast with "warming up", in which students who aspire to easier educational goals are encouraged to reach for more ambitious degrees.

== History ==
According to Burton R. Clark's 1960 article "The Cooling-Out Function in Higher Education", the term was first used by Erving Goffman in the 1952 article "Cooling the Mark Out: Some Aspects of Adaptation to Failure". Goffman used the term to describe a practice of confidence artists, but Clark proposed that it was a legitimate function of higher education to gradually refocus students from unattainable goals to achievements that were within their reach or to soften the blow of failure for what they cannot attain. Among the techniques of cooling out, students who do not achieve well on pre-entrance testing or who do not perform well in class may be refocused to remedial coursework and offered counseling and vocational planning. Academic probation may be used to encourage students to accept academic refocus.

In 2002, theorists Regina Deil-Amen and James E. Rosenbaum noted that students in many schools are encouraged to accept an ideal that college is accessible to all and defined "Cooling Out" as "the process by which community colleges urge students to recognize their academic deficiencies and lower their aspirations", noting that "cooling out may also be used to describe the ways in which community colleges get students to lower their unrealistically high expectations for obtaining bachelor's degrees and to aim for one- or two-year degrees in vocational or applied programs." They argue that cooling out should be initiated in the later years of high school by educators and administrators familiar with a student's potential.

In junior and community colleges, students are dissuaded from maintaining unrealistically high expectations of transferring and earning a bachelor's degree. Researchers say that "community colleges passively discourage student success by setting institutional roadblocks in the way of those with bachelor's degree aspirations" (p. 42). Examples of roadblocks include pre-entrance testing, counseling, orientation classes, etc.

== Examples ==
Sometimes, practices such as these are used to "cool out" a student:

- Remedial coursework, such as requiring a student to pass a basic class for no academic course credit before permitting the student to enroll in the normal class
- Encouraging students to change their plans, such as encouraging a low-performing student to give up an unrealistic dream of becoming a dentist and instead to become a dental hygienist or dental technician, which requires less training.
- Requiring students to pass certain difficult courses, with the goal of reducing the number of students who can complete the program
- Requiring students to take college entrance exams or other tests to enroll in the targeted program

== Bias in application ==
In "The Functioning of the Hidden Curriculum", E. Margolis and M. Romero note that cooling out may also be applied to students whose educational goals are unrealistic due to factors other than academic ability, such as lack of financial resources. They argue that "cooling out" has been used against students of color and women, concluding that "the less capital a student brings to the graduate setting, the more impact the process [of cooling out] has on that student's educational experience."

== Warming up ==
A contrasting process – called "warming up" – may also occur. Warming up is defined as "the raising of students' initial aspirations after they enroll in a college". Both cooling out and warming up may occur in the same schools and at equal rates. National survey data suggest that warming up may occur more than cooling out in today's community colleges.

The "warming up" process may involve some of the same techniques, such as counseling students that if they can pass the chemistry and mathematics classes needed to get a two-year degree in welding, they may also be able to handle more challenging engineering coursework.
