= National Writing Project =

The National Writing Project (NWP) is a United States professional development network that serves teachers of writing at all grade levels, primary through university, and in all subjects. Unique in breadth and scale, the NWP is a network of sites anchored at colleges and universities and serving teachers across disciplines and at all levels, from early childhood through university. The NWP network provides professional development, develops resources, generates research, and acts on knowledge to improve the teaching of writing and learning in schools and communities.

== Network of sites ==
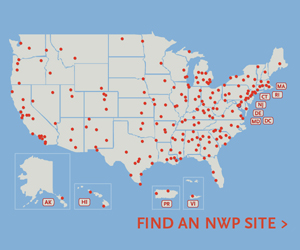

The more than 175 local sites that make up the NWP network are hosted by universities and colleges. Co-directed by faculty from the local university and from K–12 schools, local sites serve all 50 states, the District of Columbia, Puerto Rico, and the U.S. Virgin Islands. Sites work in partnership with area school districts to engage lead teachers and faculty in developing high-quality professional development programs for educators. NWP continues to add new sites each year. The network now includes two associated international sites.

== Local resources ==
NWP sites share a national program model, adhering to a set of shared principles and practices for teachers' professional development, and offering programs that are common across the network. In addition to developing a leadership cadre of local teachers (called "teacher-consultants") through invitational summer institutes, NWP sites design and deliver customized in-service programs for local schools, districts, and higher education institutions, and they provide a diverse array of continuing education and research opportunities for teachers at all levels.

National research studies have confirmed significant gains in writing performance among students of teachers who have participated in NWP programs.

The NWP is the only federally funded program that focuses on the teaching of writing. Support for the NWP is provided by the U.S. Department of Education, foundations, corporations, universities, and K-12 schools.

== Core principles ==
The core principles at the foundation of NWP's national program model are:

- Teachers at every level—from kindergarten through college—are the agents of reform; universities and schools are ideal partners for investing in that reform through professional development.
- Writing can and should be taught, not just assigned, at every grade level. Professional development programs should provide opportunities for teachers to work together to understand the full spectrum of writing development across grades and across subject areas.
- Knowledge about the teaching of writing comes from many sources: theory and research, the analysis of practice, and the experience of writing. Effective professional development programs provide frequent and ongoing opportunities for teachers to write and to examine theory, research, and practice together systematically.
- There is no single right approach to teaching writing; however, some practices prove to be more effective than others. A reflective and informed community of practice is in the best position to design and develop comprehensive writing programs.
- Teachers who are well informed and effective in their practice can be successful teachers of other teachers as well as partners in educational research, development, and implementation. Collectively, teacher-leaders are our greatest resource for educational reform.

== History ==
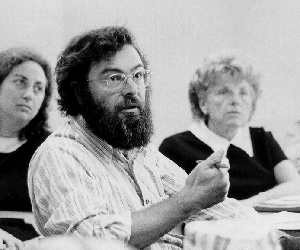
Teacher at the first summer institute in 1974

NWP began in 1974 in the Graduate School of Education at the University of California, Berkeley, where, James Gray and his colleagues established a university-based program for K–16 teachers called the Bay Area Writing Project (BAWP).

In partnership with Bay Area school districts, BAWP created a range of professional development services for teachers and schools interested in improving the teaching of writing and the use of writing as a learning tool across the curriculum. The structure of these writing programs formed the basis of NWP's "teachers-teaching-teachers" model of professional development.

By 1976, the NWP had grown to 14 sites in six states. Over the next 15 years, the network continued to grow, with funding for writing project sites made possible by foundation grants and matching funds from local sources. In 1991 NWP was authorized as a federal education program, allowing the network to expand to previously under-served areas. With its core grant from the U.S. Department of Education, supplemented by local, state, and private funds, it reached the goal of the NWP site within reach of every teacher in the nation. Following federal budget cuts in 2010 and 2011, several of the projects were forced to close or reduce numbers of summer participants.
