= College Composition and Communication =

Academic journal

- Discipline: Composition studies, rhetoric
- Language: English
- Edited by: Matt Davis, Kara Taczak

Publication details
- History: 1950–present
- Publisher: National Council of Teachers of English (United States)
- Frequency: Quarterly
- Impact factor: 0.5 (2023)

Standard abbreviations
- ISO 4: Coll. Compos. Commun.

Indexing
- ISSN: 0010-096X (print); 1939-9006 (web)
- LCCN: 54041879
- JSTOR: 0010096X
- OCLC no.: 50709729

Links
- Journal homepage; Online access; Online archive

College Composition and Communication is a peer-reviewed academic journal that was established in 1950. It covers research and scholarship in the field of rhetoric and composition studies. The journal was published by the National Council of Teachers of English as the official journal of the Conference on College Composition and Communication until the 2026 de-chartering of CCCC by NCTE. The journal has been described as the "flagship" or "essential" publication in the field of composition studies. The editors-in-chief are Matthew Davis (University of Massachusetts Boston) and Kara Taczak (University of Central Florida).

== History ==
The journal was first published in 1950 as a quarterly "bulletin" for members of the association.

=== Editors ===
The following persons are or have been editor-in-chief:

- Charles (Chas) Roberts, March 1950–May 1952 (University of Illinois); 2 years, 2 months
- George W. Wykoff, October 1952–December 1955 (Purdue University); 3 years, 2 months
- Francis E. Bowman, February 1956–December 1958 (Duke University); 2 years, 4 months
- Cecil B. Williams, February 1959–May 1959 (Oklahoma State University); 4 months
- Francis E. Bowman (noted as interim), October 1959–October 1960 (Williams took a Fulbright at University of Hamburg) (Duke University); 1 year
- Cecil B. Williams, December 1960–December 1962 (Texas Christian University); 2 years, 10 months
- Ken Macrorie, February 1962–December 1964 (Western Michigan University); 2 years, 10 months
- William Irmscher, February 1965–December 1973 (University of Washington); 8 years, 10 months
- Edward P.J. Corbett, February 1974–December 1979 (Ohio State University); 5 years, 10 months
- Richard Larson, February 1980–December 1986 (Lehman College CUNY); 6 years, 10 months
- Richard Gebhardt, February 1987–December 1993 (Findlay College; Bowling Green State University); 6 years, 10 months
- Joseph Harris, February 1994–December 1999 (University of Pittsburgh; Duke University); 5 years, 10 months
- Marilyn Cooper, February 2000–December 2004 (Michigan Tech); 4 years, 10 months
- Deborah Holdstein, February 2005–December 2009 (Governors State University; Columbia College Chicago); 4 years, 10 months
- Kathleen Blake Yancey, February 2010–December 2014 (Florida State University); 4 years, 10 months
- Jonathan Alexander, February 2015–December 2019 (UC-Irvine); 4 years, 10 months
- Malea Powell, February 2020–December 2024 (Michigan State University); 4 years, 10 months
- Kara Taczak and Matt Davis, February 2025– (University of Central Florida and UMass-Boston, respectively)

== Notable articles ==
As of 2024 the following articles have been cited most according to Web of Science:

- Kopple, William J. Vande (1985). "Some Exploratory Discourse on Metadiscourse". College Composition and Communication. 36 (1): 82–93. doi:10.2307/357609.
- Canagarajah, A. Suresh (2006). "The Place of World Englishes in Composition: Pluralization Continued". College Composition and Communication. 57 (4): 586–619.
- Flower, Linda; Hayes, John R.; Carey, Linda; Schriver, Karen; Stratman, James (1986). "Detection, Diagnosis, and the Strategies of Revision". College Composition and Communication. 37 (1): 16–55. doi:10.2307/357381.
- Lyons, Scott Richard (2000). "Rhetorical Sovereignty: What Do American Indians Want from Writing?". College Composition and Communication. 51 (3): 447–468. doi:10.2307/358744.
- Sommers, Nancy (1982). "Responding to Student Writing". College Composition and Communication. 33 (2): 148–156. doi:10.2307/357622.

== Abstracting and indexing ==
The journal is abstracted and indexed in:

- Arts and Humanities Citation Index
- Current Contents/Arts & Humanities
- EBSCO databases
- International Bibliography of Periodical Literature
- Modern Language Association Database
- ProQuest databases
- Scopus

According to the Journal Citation Reports, the journal has a 2023 impact factor of 0.5.

== See also ==
- English studies
- College English
- Written Communication
