= Conference on College Composition and Communication =

Association of university writing instructors

Conference on College Composition and Communication (CCCC)
- Formation: April 1949
- Founded: 1949
- Purpose: Teaching, composition, rhetoric, writing
- Location: Illinois, United States
- Key people: Kofi J. Adisa, 2026 Chair; Melissa Ianetta, 2026 Program Chair
- Website: https://cccc.ncte.org/cccc/conv

The Conference on College Composition and Communication (CCCC, often referred to as "Four Cs" or "Cs") was a national professional association of college and university writing instructors in the United States. The CCCC formed in 1949 as a conference of the National Council of Teachers of English (NCTE). CCCC was the largest organization dedicated to writing research, theory, and teaching worldwide. The association was an active organization within NCTE from its formation until 2026. The decision to de-charter CCCC, which resulted in swift and critical pushback from its members, was announced by NCTE on July 20, 2026.

== Publications ==
Until its 2026 de-chartering, the CCCC published the following journals: College Composition and Communication, the Studies in Writing and Rhetoric Series, and FORUM: Issues About Part-Time and Contingent Faculty. Previously, the CCCC also published Bibliography of Composition and Rhetoric, from 1984 to 1999.

College Composition and Communication (CCC) is a quarterly journal that seeks to promote scholarship, research, and the teaching of writing at the collegiate level. Back issues can be accessed through the CCCC website. The CCCC also publishes the College Composition and Communication Online (CCC Online) journal, which focuses on Web-based text and digital research, and their website offers the CCC Online Archive, a tool that can be used to search the CCC.

The CCCC co-publishes the Studies in Writing and Rhetoric (SWR) book series with WAC Clearinghouse, which focuses on researching the history of teaching and studying writing and rhetoric, as well as highlighting the diversity of the members involved in these communities.

FORUM: Issues About Part-Time and Contingent Faculty is published twice a year and can be found in CCC and Teaching English in the Two-Year College (TETYC). Publishing about the realities and perspectives of professionals involved in the field of college composition is the journal's focus.

From 1984 to 1999, the CCCC published Bibliography of Composition and Rhetoric. An archive to its content is linked to by the CCCC website and hosted on ibiblio.

== Conferences ==
=== Annual convention ===
CCCC held an annual convention, which usually had over 3000 members in attendance. The location of the convention and convention chair changes from year to year. The convention was primarily made up of scholarly panels, featured speakers, committee meetings, special interest group meetings, and workshops. An additional part of the convention was the Research Network Forum (RNF) -- a round-table venue where novice and experienced researchers gathered to present works-in-progress, discuss methodologies, and share possible future projects—which had been called the "unofficial mentoring arm of CCCC." While Research Network Forum invited all researchers in Composition/Rhetoric/Writing Studies to submit a proposal, the Qualitative Research Network (QRN) focused only qualitative research. In addition, the opening meeting of the convention usually featured the CCCC Chair's Address, during which the convention chair addressed the entire assembly of participants, often articulating a vision of the field of rhetoric and composition. In 2026, the president of NCTE gave a brief address encouraging attendance of the NCTE national convention but did not mention any of the reasons he would give a few months later for voting to de-charter CCCC.

==== Awards ====
The convention is also the time when CCCC presents several yearly awards, including the Exemplar Award (which recognizes an individual who has served as an exemplar for the organization), Outstanding Book Award, Outstanding Teaching Award, Richard Braddock Award (for the most outstanding article in CCC), the Stonewall Service Award (which recognizes those who have consistently worked to improve the experiences of sexual and gender minorities within the organization and the profession), the James Berlin Memorial Outstanding Dissertation Award, Chair's Memorial Scholarship (for graduate students presenting at the convention), Writing Program Certificate of Excellence, in addition to several others, including a variety of awards supporting travel to the conference.

=== Prior conventions ===
| Date | Location | Theme | Program Chair |
|---|---|---|---|
| March 4-7, 2026 | Cleveland, OH | "Conference and Our Conversations" | Melissa Ianetta |
| April 8-12, 2027 | Baltimore, MD | "‘Computer Love’: Extended Play, B-sides, Remix, Collaboration, and Creativity” | Kofi J. Adisa |
| April 3-6, 2024 | Spokane, WA | "Writing Abundance: Celebrating 75 Years of Conversations about Rhetoric, Composition, Technical Communication, and Literacy" | Jennifer Sano-Franchini |
| February 15–18, 2023 | Chicago, IL | ”Doing Hope in Desperate Times” | Frankie Condon |
| March 9–12, 2022 | Scheduled for Chicago, IL but moved online due to Coronavirus | "The Promises and Perils of Higher Education: Our Discipline’s Commitment to Diversity, Equity, and Linguistic Justice" | Staci M. Perryman-Clark |
| April 7–10, 2021 | Scheduled for Spokane, WA but moved online due to Coronavirus | "We Are All Writing Teachers*: Returning to a Common Place" | Holly Hassel |
| March 25–28, 2020 (Cancelled due to Coronavirus) | Milwaukee, WI | "Considering Our Commonplaces" | Julie Lindquist |
| March 13–16, 2019 | Pittsburgh, PA | "Performance-Rhetoric, Performance-Composition" | Vershawn Ashanti Young |
| March 14–17, 2018 | Kansas City, MO | "Languaging, Laboring, and Transforming" | Asao B. Inoue |
| March 15–18, 2017 | Portland, OR | "Cultivating Capacity, Creating Change" | Carolyn Calhoon-Dillahunt |
| April 6–9, 2016 | Houston, TX | "Writing Strategies for Action" | Linda Adler-Kassner |
| March 18–21, 2015 | Tampa, FL | "Risk and Reward" | Joyce Locke Carter |
| March 19–22, 2014 | Indianapolis, IN | "Open | Source(s), Access, Futures” | Adam Banks |
| March 13–16, 2013 | Las Vegas, NV | "The Public Work of Composition" | Howard Tinberg |
| March 21–24, 2012 | St. Louis, MO | "Writing Gateways" | Chris Anson |
| April 6–9, 2011 | Atlanta, GA | "All Our Relations: Contested Spaces, Contested Knowledge" | Malea Powell |
| March 17–20, 2010 | Louisville, KY | "The Remix: Revisit, Rethink, Revise, Renew" | Gwendolyn D. Pough |
| March 11–14, 2009 | San Francisco, CA | "Making Waves" | Marilyn Valentino |
| April 2–5, 2008 | New Orleans, LA | "Writing Realities, Changing Realities" | Charles Bazerman |
| March 21–24, 2007 | New York, NY | "Representing Identities" | Cheryl Glenn |
| March 22–25, 2006 | Chicago, IL | "Composition in the Center Spaces: Building Community, Culture, Coalitions" | Akua Duku Anokye |
| March 16–19, 2005 | San Francisco, CA | “Opening the Golden Gates: Access, Affirmative Action, and Student Success” | Judith Wootten |
| March 24–27, 2004 | San Antonio, TX | “Making Composition Matter: Students, Citizens, Institutions, Advocacy” | Douglas D. Hesse |
| March 19–22, 2003 | New York, NY | "Rewriting 'Theme for English B': Transforming Possibilities" | Kathleen Blake Yancey |
| March 20–23, 2002 | Chicago, IL | “Connecting the Text and the Street” | Shirley Wilson Logan |
| March 14–17, 2001 | Denver, CO | “Composing Community” | John Lovas |
| April 12–15, 2000 | Minneapolis, MN | “Educating the Imagination: Reimagining Education” | Wendy Bishop |
| March 24–27, 1999 | Atlanta, GA | “Visible Students, Visible Teachers” | Keith Gilyard |
| April 1–4, 1998 | Chicago, IL | “Ideas, Historias y Cuentos: Breaking with Precedent” | Victor Villanueva |
| March 12–15, 1997 | Phoenix, AZ | “Just Teaching, Just Writing: Reflection and Responsibility” | Cynthia Selfe |
| March 27–30, 1996 | Milwaukee, WI | “Transcending Boundaries” | Nell Ann Pickett |
| March 22–25, 1995 | Washington, D.C. | “Literacies, Technologies, Responsibilities” | Lester Faigley |
| March 16–19, 1994 | Nashville, TN | “Common Concerns, Uncommon realities: Teaching, Research, and Scholarship in a Complex World” | Jacqueline Jones Royster |
| April 1–3, 1993 | San Diego, CA | “Twentieth Century Problems, Twenty-First Century Solutions: Issues, Answers, Actions” | Lillian Bridwell-Bowles |
| March 19–21, 1992 | Cincinnati, OH | “Contexts, Communities, and Constraints: Sites of Composing and Communicating” | Anne Ruggles Gere |
| March 21–23, 1991 | Boston, MA | “Times of Trial, Reorientation, Reconstruction: A Fin de Siecle Review/Prophecy” | William W. Cook |
| March 22–24, 1990 | Chicago, IL | “Strengthening Community Through Diversity” | Donald McQuade |
| March 16–18, 1989 | Seattle, WA | “Empowering Students and Ourselves in an Interdependent World” | Jane E. Peterson |
| March 17–19, 1988 | St. Louis, MO | “Language, Self, and Society” | Andrea A. Lunsford |
| March 19–21, 1987 | Atlanta, GA | "The Uses of Literacy: A Writer’s Work In and Out of the Academy” | David Bartholomae |
| March 13–15, 1986 | New Orleans, LA | “Using the Power of Language to Make the Impossible Possible” | Miriam T. Chaplin |
| March 21–23, 1985 | Minneapolis, MN | “Making Connections” | Lee Odell |
| March 29–31, 1984 | New York, NY | “Making Writing the Cornerstone of an Education for Freedom” | Maxine Hairston |
| March 17–19, 1983 | Detroit, MI | “The Writer’s World(s): Achieving Insight and Impact” | Rosentene B. Purnell |
| March 18–20, 1982 | San Francisco, CA | “Serving Our Students, Our Public, and Our Profession” | Donald C. Stewart |
| March 26–28, 1981 | Dallas, TX | “Our Profession: Achieving Perspectives for the 1980s” | James Lee Hill |
| March 13–15, 1980 | Washington, D.C. | “Writing: The Person and the Process” | Lynn Quitman Troyka |
| April 5–7, 1979 | Minneapolis, MN | “Writing: A Cross-Disciplinary Enterprise” | Frank D’Angelo |
| March 30 – April 1, 1978 | Denver, CO | “Excellence in What We Do: Our Attitude Toward Teaching Composition” | William F. Irmscher |
| March 31 – April 2, 1977 | Kansas City, KS | “Two Hundred Plus One: Communicating in the Third American Century” | Vivian I. Davis |
| March 25–27, 1976 | Philadelphia, PA | “What’s Really Basic? A Bicentennial Review of the Basic Issues of English” | Richard Lloyd-Jones |
| March 13–15, 1975 | St. Louis, MO | “Untapped Resources” | Marianna W. Davis |
| April 4–6, 1974 | Anaheim, CA | “Hidden Agendas: What Are We Doing When We Do What We Do?” | Lionel R. Sharp |
| April 5–7, 1973 | New Orleans, LA | “Issues, Challenges, and Opportunities” | Richard L. Larson |
| March 23–25, 1972 | Boston, MA | “Reconsidering Roles: What Are We About?” | James D. Barry |
| March 25–27, 1971 | Cincinnati, OH | “Coming Together—SOS from the Darkling Plain” | |
| March 19–21, 1970 | Seattle, WA | | |
| April 17–19, 1969 | Miami, FL | | |
| April 4–6, 1968 | Minneapolis, MN | | |
| April 6–8, 1967 | Louisville, KY | | |
| March 24–26, 1966 | Denver, CO | | |
| April 8–10, 1965 | St. Louis, MO | | |
| March 25–28, 1964 | New York, NY | “Freshman English: Return to Composition” | |
| March 21–24, 1963 | Los Angeles, CA | “The Content of the English Course” | |
| April 5–7, 1962 | Chicago, IL | "What Is English?" | |
| April 6–8, 1961 | Washington, D.C. | | |
| March 31 – April 2, 1960 | Cincinnati, OH | | |
| April 2–4, 1959 | San Francisco, CA | "Tenth Annual Meeting" | |
| March 27–29, 1958 | Philadelphia, PA | | |
| March 21–23, 1957 | Chicago, IL | | |
| March 22–24, 1956 | New York, NY | | |
| March 24–26, 1955 | Chicago, IL | | |
| March 4–6, 1954 | St. Louis, MO | | |
| March 13–14, 1953 | Chicago, IL | | |
| March 28–29, 1952 | Cleveland, OH | | |
| March 30–31, 1951 | Chicago, IL | | |
| March 24–25, 1950 | Chicago, IL | | |
| 1949 | | | |

=== Future conventions ===
==== 2027 conference ====
To be held April 14–17, 2027 in Milwaukee, Wisconsin.

== Mission ==
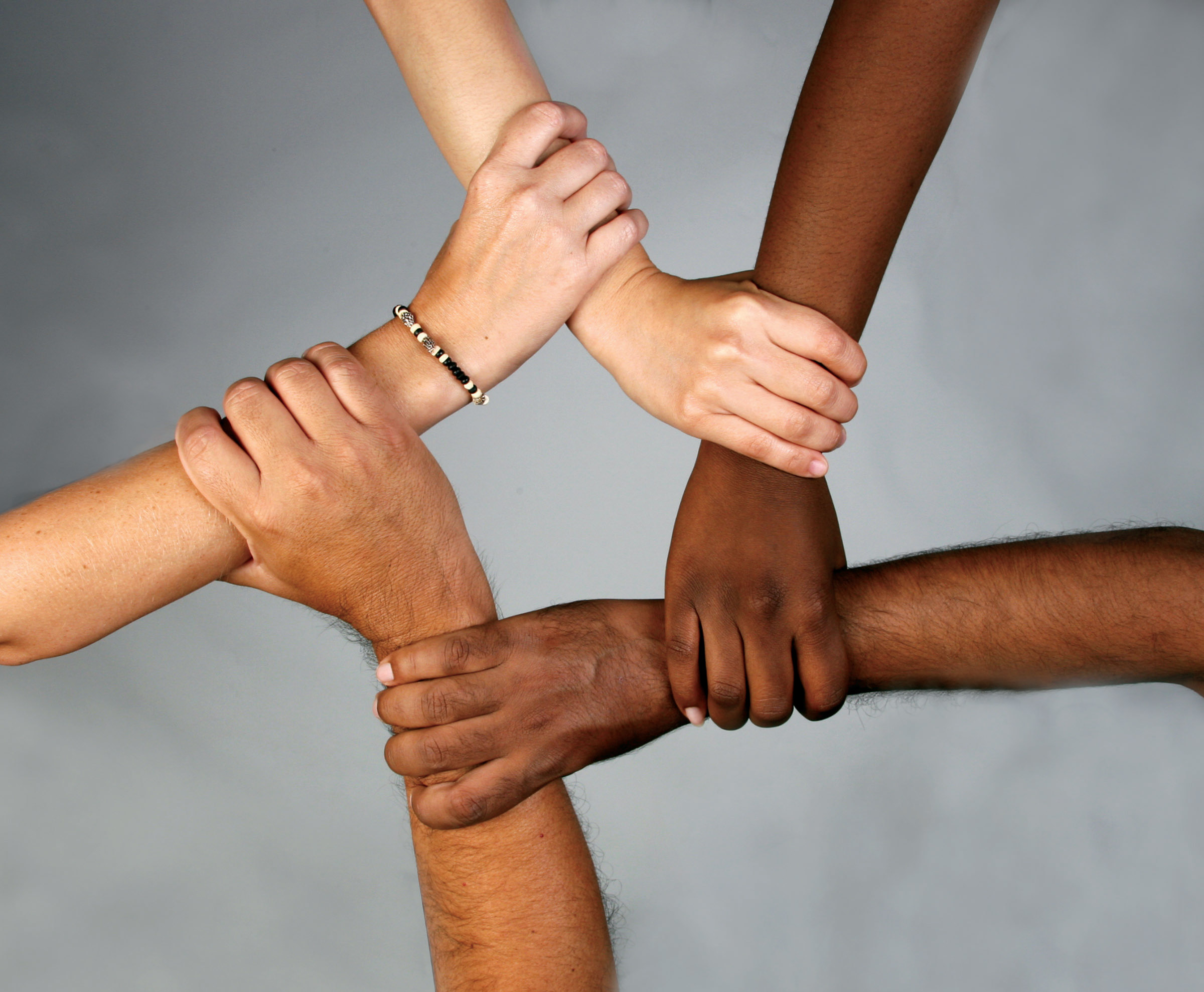
The CCCC aims to promote inclusivity and diverse perspectives within the field of writing studies.

The organization has the four following aims:

1. sponsoring meetings and publishing scholarly materials for the exchange of knowledge about composition, composition pedagogy, and rhetoric
2. supporting a wide range of research on composition, communication, and rhetoric by individuals of diverse ethnic and racial backgrounds
3. working to enhance the conditions for learning and teaching college composition and to promote professional development
4. acting as an advocate for the advancement of a holistic understanding of language and literacy education

== Position statements ==
CCCC has published a number of position statements on writing, teaching of writing, and related issues. Emerging from committees within CCCC, the position statements seek to promote the CCCC goals and encourage best practices in writing pedagogy, language practices, research, literacy, professional development, and working conditions. CCCC position statements fall under the following six categories: "Statements on Teaching and Learning in Postsecondary Language and Literacy Classrooms," "Statements on Social and Linguistic Justice and Antiracist Pedagogies," "Professional Standards and Resources: Research," "Professional Standards and Resources: Teaching and Learning," "Professional Standards and Resources: Working Conditions," and "Statements on Current Issues." Recent statements include:

- CCCC Statement on White Language Supremacy (June 2021)
- CCCC Statement on Recent Violent Crimes against Asians, Asian Americans, and Pacific Islanders (March 2021)
- CCCC Statement on Violence at the Capitol on January 6, 2021 (January 2021)
- CCCC Black Technical and Professional Communication Position Statement with Resource Guide (September 2020)
- This Ain’t Another Statement! This is a DEMAND for Black Linguistic Justice! (July 2020)
- Position Statement on CCCC Standards for Ethical Conduct Regarding Sexual Violence, Sexual Harassment, and Workplace Bullying (November 2016, revised March 2020)
- Students’ Right to Their Own Language (April 1974, reaffirmed November 2003, annotated bibliography added August 2006, reaffirmed November 2014)

== Committees ==
The permanent CCCC executive committee oversees a number of temporarily constituted special interest committees. These committees are constituted for a 3-year period, after which the executive committee can reconstitute the committee for another term.

== Initiatives ==
The organization sponsors the CCCC Research Initiative, which provides funds to researchers working on datasets collected by the organization and its affiliates. Begun in 2004, the grant has provided means for various research projects, including the "Composition, Rhetoric, and Literacy—What We Know, What We Need to Know" project that ran from 2004 to 2007. In addition to providing grant support to individual and collective projects and promoting inter-institutional collaboration, the project is designed to "create a sustained research initiative to advance scholarship in composition and rhetoric".

CCCC, along with its parent organization, the National Council of Teachers of English, sponsors a number of initiatives on writing, including the National Day on Writing held annually on October 20, as well as the CCCC Wikipedia Initiative, which focuses on expanding Wikipedia's coverage of topics related to writing research and pedagogy, verifying that article content is based on reliable secondary sources, and revising and editing writing studies to improve their overall quality.

== See also ==
- Composition studies
