= Composition studies =

Field of research focused on composition

Composition studies (also referred to as composition and rhetoric, rhetoric and composition, writing studies, or simply composition) is the professional field of writing, research, and instruction, focusing especially on writing at the college level in the United States.

In most US and some Canadian colleges and universities, undergraduates take freshman or higher-level composition courses. To support the effective administration of these courses, there are developments of basic and applied research on the acquisition of writing skills, and an understanding of the history of the uses and transformation of writing systems and writing technologies (among many other subareas of research), over 70 American universities offer doctoral study in rhetoric and composition. These programs of study usually include composition pedagogical theory, linguistics, professional and technical communication, qualitative and quantitative research methods, the history of rhetoric, as well as the influence of different writing conventions and genres on writers' composing processes more generally.

Composition scholars also publish in the fields of teaching English as a second or foreign language (TESOL) or second language writing, writing centers, and new literacies.

== Basic writing ==
Many historians of Composition Studies argue that the matter of who exactly should be defined as a "basic writer" and what counts as "basic writing" is complex. The definition of "basic" has been disputed when framed around issues of writing proficiency in "Standard English", increasingly racially/ethnically diverse college demographics, which both resulted from post-secondary desegregation mandates. For example, the term "basic writing" has been attributed to the SEEK program started by Mina P. Shaughnessy at the City University of New York, which she designed to help incoming college students from open admissions who had not historically been able to attend college. Consistent with then-current educational theories, many of these courses focused on what were at that time believed to be core concepts of formal English, like spelling, usage, and organization, though as the field has advanced these courses are increasingly aligned with the curricula found in mainstream first-year composition. Basic writing coursework has diversified considerably since its beginnings in non-credit-bearing 'pre' college courses, including stretch, studio, and accelerated offerings, although they remain typically understood as precursors to or supplements for mainstream first-year composition.

== First-year composition ==
Most US universities have a required first-year composition course, also referred to as FYC. Although both are typically housed in Departments of English, these courses are not the same as literature courses, which focus on literary analysis and interpretation. While some colleges and universities do incorporate literature and other humanities into their composition courses, it is much more often the case that composition coursework offers intensive instruction in writing non-fiction, expository texts using academic discourse conventions. Writing curricula vary considerably from institution to institution, but it may emphasize many stages of different writing processes (invention or brainstorming, drafting, revision, editing, proofreading), different forms of writing (narration, exposition, description, argumentation, comparison, and contrast), different portions of the written product (introductions, conclusions, thesis statements, presentation and documentation of forms of evidence, inclusion of quotations, etc.), along with different modalities of composing to expand the concept of 'writing'. Pedagogies or approaches to teaching writing are grounded in a range of different traditions and philosophies. The overall goal for first year composition is to build a base to build off of as students develop into more advanced writers. It is important for students to understand the steps it takes to learn the fundamentals in college level writing. This is the sole purpose of first year composition.

== Advanced composition ==
Some universities require further instruction in writing and offer courses that expand upon the skills developed in first-year composition. Second level or advanced composition may emphasize forms of argumentation and persuasion, digital media, research and source documentation formats, and/or genres of writing across a range of disciplines and genres (see § Writing across the curriculum below). For example, the skills required to write business letters or annual reports will differ significantly from those required to write historical or scientific research or personal memoirs.

== Graduate studies ==
Doctoral programs in Composition Studies are available at 94 universities, and Masters programs are available in over 170 universities. Such programs are commonly housed within English Studies or Education programs. However, recently there are an increasing number of departments specifically dedicated to this field of study (e.g. Composition Studies, Writing & Rhetoric, Composition & Linguistics, etc.).

== Second-language writing ==
Second language writing is the practice of teaching English composition to non-native speakers and writers of English. Teaching writing to ESL students does not receive much attention because even in ESL classes teachers focus on speaking, listening, and reading, not just writing. Paul Kei Matsuda in his article "Situating ESL Writing in a Cross-Disciplinary Context" stresses the importance of teaching writing specifically with understanding the needs of ESL students to help them improve their writing. Teaching writing has progressed through several approaches during the history of education in the United States. ESL teachers might need to explore common methods which are the cognitive, social and expressive theories to create an approach that meets the needs of ESL writers and help them to overcome their difficulties.

The first one of these approaches is the cognitive view which says that writing is progressing from one stage to another in a series of single steps. That means "good" writing is a planned process, which includes planning, translating, and reviewing. "Understanding Composing" by Sondra Perl explains in detail this approach. She suggests that the composition of writing occurs as a recursive process. She took this idea from her observation of different writers. She thinks that writers return to backward parts of the process in order to move "forward" with the overall composition. ESL teachers may find this approach helpful at first in teaching beginning ESL students because at this level students do not have large amounts of vocabulary and grammar or knowledge of the style of essays which is the basis of writing English. Al-Buainain Haifa in her article "Student Writing Errors in EFL", points out that, when a researcher asked ESL students by using a survey what they would like to have learned or learned better in their writing classes, they found that the largest percentages expressed specific needs in vocabulary and grammar. Many kinds of grammar make ESL students confused, especially because there are many exceptions. Because writing styles are different in different languages, ESL students need time to master them. Therefore, ESL teachers should find an effective way to teach ESL students vocabulary, grammar, and style because the writing of English requires them. The cognitive approach can meet these needs because it emphasizes the steps, organization, and process of writing.

Another approach is the social view which shows the importance of teaching writing by making students learn the different languages of discourse communities. This is what David Bartholomae emphasizes in his article "Inventing the University". He uses "Inventing the University" as a phrase that describes the writing process that a student will experience when writing teachers ask them to write about a topic that relates to a discourse community that is new for them. A discourse community can be thought of as members of an academic discipline or a select audience. When ESL students have become good at grammar and style, they face a large problem when they enter their chosen academic field. Bartholomae in this article illustrates that each academic community has a particular language or vocabulary. The problem is that any academic field has its own language, even jargon, that differs from one to another. This problem is faced not only by ESL students, but all American students will struggle with this when they begin the first year of their academic life. The social approach can be used by ESL teachers as a second step but they should make sure that their students master the basics of English writing such as grammar and style.

Moreover, the expressive view which is represented in Donald Murray's article "Teach Writing as a Process Not Product", allows for wittier creating and freer movement. It suggests three elements for "good" writing which are integrity, originality, and spontaneity. However, it is difficult to evaluate them in a paper. Therefore, these standards cannot be relied upon to judge writing. In addition, these elements are not the important elements that help to assess "good" writing. ESL teachers might use this approach but it can only be used for highly advanced ESL students. It is difficult to ask ESL students to write freely if they possess limited vocabulary or grammar. They need examples to help them which they can find in the cognitive approach.

ESL teachers may use these common ways of teaching writing, but they need first to understand their student's difficulties. Learning writing is one of the essential difficulties that ESL students find in studying English, especially since writing is important in an academic community. Some ESL students may need to jump from being a student who does not speak English ever to a student who uses academic language in a short time which may put a large burden on their shoulders. Hence, teaching writing to ESL students is different than teaching native speakers. ESL teachers need to choose an effective way to meet the needs of ESL students. It would be helpful if ESL teachers look at these different ways of teaching writing to see which one addresses ESL students' difficulties in the best way or if a combination of these theories may be better.

=== Multicultural pedagogies ===
==== Basis in composition studies ====
While multicultural pedagogies are not specifically tied to second-language writing pedagogies, compositionists have often considered how students' cultural knowledge and use of idioms, dialects, and/or languages other than American Edited English (AEA) can enhance their instruction in English composition. For example, Maxine Hairston's "Diversity, Ideology, and Teaching Writing" advocates for students' expressivist writing to be central in a composition course, and believes students "need to write to find out how much they know and to gain confidence in the ability to express themselves effectively" (186). Hairston also believes that teachers can design writing assignments to encourage "cross-cultural awareness" (191). In addition, Beth Daniell's approach in "Narratives of Literacy: Connecting College Composition to Culture" describes how studies in "little narratives [that] almost all examine literacy in particular local settings" championed by scholars who "seldom make theoretical statements that claim to be valid for literate cultures in general or literate cultures in general," which would allow students to engage in cultural critique (403). Aaron Schutz and Anne Ruggles Gere's article for College English, "Service Learning and English Studies," described how Schutz's course, while it was mainly focused in service-learning and local activism, engaged students in collaborative research and writing surrounding campus-wide issues, such as an instance of racial discrimination that occurred in the local student union; this allowed students to engage in cultural awareness as well as a cultural critique (129-39).

Furthermore, In Empowering Education, Ira Shor delineates a pedagogy in which the teacher facilitates discussion of generative themes produced by the students, using the example of his basic writing course with working-class students at "a low-budget college in New York City" several decades ago (10). The Freirean approach for teaching literacy and writing that Shor reviews in Empowering Education demonstrates how the generative words manifested themselves "[through] researching local issues and language in the students' communities. From the many linguistic and sociological items...the educators selected some key concerns—generative themes expressed through generative words" (55). In this framework, teachers and students research these items collaboratively, and once students have presented their research on problems in their community, they may begin to decide how they might analyze and upend power structures or rhetorical situations that contribute to and exacerbate such issues. For Shor's classroom, "[t]he generative themes [that have] emerg[ed]...from student culture have most often related to sex, abortion, drugs, family, education, careers, work, and the economic crisis" (56). Shor believes it is important to allow students to build a basis for problem-posing upon their prior knowledge and experiences to make it multicultural.

Shor also reviews Paolo Freire's literacy project in Brazil as described in Freire's Pedagogy of the Oppressed, which enforces the idea that all people are creators of culture through visuals, oral discussion, and creation of word lists that are the basis for which the people begin to use language to express how the dominant culture operates, how their home culture operates, and how these systemic actions impact themselves and the world. In this way, both Freire and Shor believe problem-posing education can be situated in multicultural practices as well as critical literacy practices. Shor insists "subject matter is best introduced as problems related to the student experience, in language familiar to them".

==== Critical reception ====
Overall, previous scholars' discussion of multiculturalism in the classroom seems to privilege "cross-cultural interactions" and valuing students' home languages as well as their cultural ideologies. However, in Donald Lazere's Political Literacy in Composition and Rhetoric, Lazere criticizes Hairston, Daniell, Schutz, Gere, and other scholars for their approaches because of their singular focus on localism in lieu of more "global" and critical approaches to the study of culture in the composition classroom (152-153). In addition, Lazere was critical of scholars' tendency to diminish the power of Edited American English (EAE) and misrepresent the power of the students' regional code (116). While Lazere supports Shor's approach to multicultural critical pedagogy, he admits some level of discomfort with applying it in his own classroom especially with respect to how much responsibility and stock Shor places in students (39).

==== Current approaches ====
Lazere's critique of previous scholarship related to multiculturalism pedagogies, in Political Literacy in Composition and Rhetoric and elsewhere, has prompted current composition theorists, both in second-language writing and in the field of composition in general, to consider how multicultural pedagogies can embrace globalism as much as localism.

For example, Lisa Eck's "Thinking Globally, Teaching Locally" describes how Eck teaches world literature courses in which students read cultural narratives and problematize them—in the article, she references her use of Tsitsi Dangarembga's Nervous Conditions in her composition classroom. Through her teaching, she is attempting to answer the question of how multicultural pedagogical practices could still be based in research, critical literacy, and problem-posing education. In her approach, she engages students in the kind of literary criticism that is necessary for analyzing and evaluating critical discourse: "I work to make hybrid postcolonial identities familiar, even analogous at times, to what we understand as the process of identity formation for the average postmodern college student....I [also] use the Otherness of the cultures reproduced in foreign texts to estrange the American familiar" (579). The kinds of inquiry students are using to analyze the text are to show how the text is both "not about you" and "about you," and how these processes of identity formation are the kinds of processes necessary to critically evaluate public discourse.

Furthermore, Jennifer S. Wilson's approach to critical pedagogy in second-language writing as she describes it in her article, "Engaging Second Language Writers in Freshman Composition: A Critical Approach", utilizes a perspective that provides opportunities for the types of writing necessary for students to critically analyze and evaluate ideologies entrenched in the dominant discourse, even as they are learning English as their second language. In other words, the four major elements of the course that Wilson describes, especially with respect to the ideas she offers for critical writing assignments, create alternative pathways for students to produce writing that has the potential to disrupt cultural and political ideologies represented in various avenues and niches of the dominant public discourse. For example, in addition to incorporating "local topics," Wilson provides options for students to "investigate language use in certain communities, societies, or cultures" as well as "investigating" the relationships between language and power (8-9). Even more important, she insists that "[c]ritical pedagogy is concerned with minimizing the power differential between student and teacher; in composition classrooms, one way for students to maximize their voices is to publish their work in authentic ways" (9).

== Writing across the curriculum ==
Because academic discourse is not monolithic (in other words, there are curricula that address that the concept of academic discourse can be applied to specific parts of a writing curriculum), many compositionists have created writing across the curriculum (WAC) movement that situates writing-intensive instruction in specific academic discourse communities.

== The reading and apprenticeship connections ==
According to some writing theorists, reading for pleasure provides a more effective way of mastering the art of writing than does a formal study of writing, language, grammar, and vocabulary.

"Studies that sought to improve writing by providing reading experiences in place of grammar study or additional writing practice found that these experiences were as beneficial as, or more beneficial than, grammar study or extra writing practice."

The apprenticeship approach provides one variant of the reading connection, arguing that the composition classroom should resemble pottery or piano workshops—minimizing dependence on excessive self-reflection, preoccupation with the audience, and explicit rules. By watching the master, according to Michael Polanyi, an "apprentice unconsciously picks up the rules of the art, including those which are not explicitly known to the master himself." Writing instructors, according to this approach, serve as models and coaches, providing explicit feedback in response to the learner's compositions. Students focus their attention on the task at hand, and not on "an inaccessible and confusing multitude of explicit rules and strategies."

== Writing in the disciplines ==
Many university writing programs include writing in the disciplines (WID) courses, which focus on the genres and writing procedures that occur within specific fields of research.

== The connection between speech and writing ==
There is a connection between writing and speech. Composition and writing studies are connected because of rhetoric. Incorporating speech in writing classrooms helps students express themselves in their writing. They constantly don't have the thought if their writing is good enough. Furthermore, they can write in the manner of how they would speak so they can fully express their thoughts and creativity on paper. In addition, studying speech alongside writing helps multilingual writers.

== Writing center ==
Many colleges and universities have a writing center, which offers supplementary tutorial support for writing specifically in English classes and/or across the curriculum. Many universities not in North America only offer writing instruction via writing centers. The European Association for the Teaching of Academic Writing (EATAW), for example, specifically concerns itself with the study and advancement of writing centers in Europe.

Writing centers serve the purpose of writing as a social process that demands engaging both tutors and writers.

Since multimodality has resonated with Composition Studies, many writing centers have developed associated centers to support students' multimodal, multimedia composing. Some models for this work include the digital studio and the multiliteracy center.

== See also ==
- Cognitive rhetoric
- Comics studies
- Communication studies
- Composition (language)
- Conference on College Composition and Communication
- Contrastive rhetoric
- Digital rhetoric
- English studies
- Media theory of composition
- National Writing Project
- Professional communication
- Technical communication
- Technical writing
- Theories of rhetoric and composition pedagogy
- Writing assessment
- Writing center
- Writing center assessment
