= Rhetorical velocity =

Rhetorical velocity is a term originating from the fields of composition studies and rhetoric used to describe how rhetoricians may strategically theorize and anticipate the third party recomposition of their texts. In their 2009 article "Composing for Recomposition: Rhetorical Velocity and Delivery" in Kairos: A Journal of Rhetoric, Technology, and Pedagogy, Jim Ridolfo and Dànielle Nicole DeVoss provide the example of a writer delivering a press release, where the writer of the release rhetorically anticipates the positive and negative ways in which the text may be recomposed into other texts, including news articles, blog posts, and video content. It is similar to having something go viral. Author Sean Morey agrees in his book The Digital Writer that rhetorical velocity is the way in which a creator predicts how the audience will make use of their original work.

Practicing rhetorical velocity allows the speaker/writer to theorize of all possible outcomes with time and delivery (or Kairos) since it is information that could be in the public sphere. Ridolfo and DeVoss argue that this thinking is indicative of the modern notion of actio, one that requires a new strategy and theory for thinking about the delivery, distribution, and recomposition of texts and rhetorical objects. It is stated in their article that "...composing in the digital age is different than traditional practices of composing." Since traditional composition consists of one's original thought that is transformed into writing, digital composition requires a lot more editing in its own sphere. Ridfolfo and DeVoss referred to its qualities as "mix, mass[,] and merge".

For example, the rhetorical velocity of a press advisory encompasses the publication deadlines, reporters' material conditions (including how local reporters prefer to receive and process the text). These considerations are calculated alongside the rhetorical goals of the advisory writer(s). It takes into account the delivery and composition of the given work in relation to the writers' future goals for reproduction. In this sense, rhetorical velocity considers the future times (and in particular moments) and places of texts as part of a distributive strategy. Another example of rhetorical velocity is through an internet meme, which includes the various characteristics of rhetorical circulation, including economics, distribution, and transformation. For instance, memes can participate in the circulation of technical scientific and environmental communication for digital public discourse.

In 2017, Ridolfo and Devoss revisited their idea of rhetorical velocity to analyze how remixes of work can be related to the concept. To enhance the reach of a published piece of rhetoric, they noted that a writer may develop their work in a manner that encourages others to reuse and remix their ideas, by adding their own thoughts to enhance the message of the original, rather than simply sharing the piece unchanged. They point towards the Grey Tuesday event, hosted by music activist group Downhill Battle, as an example of rhetoricians utilizing rhetorical velocity alongside remixing to spread a message. To protest a cease-and-desist order sent by EMI against Danger Mouse's Grey Album, Downhill Battle provided graphics and color codes to websites looking to stand in solidarity with their message. By allowing web owners to remix assets provided by the group with their own website, Downhill Battle ensured that a large number of sites were encouraged to participate in their protest. This strategic thinking, which was underscored by a strong understanding of rhetorical velocity, amplified the protests message and spread it to a wider audience than any single website could have reached on its own.

== See also ==
- Digital rhetoric
- Kairos
- Meme
- Modes of persuasion
- Public sphere pedagogy
- Rhetorical circulation
