= Persuasive video games =

Subgenre of serious games

Persuasive video games are a subgenre of serious games designed to influence players’ attitudes, beliefs, or behaviors. These games aim to deliver intentional messages through gameplay mechanics and interactivity, often addressing social, political, educational, or health-related issues. Unlike games made purely for entertainment, persuasive games use gameplay to present arguments, challenge perceptions, and inspire critical reflection.

The concept was developed by Ian Bogost in his 2007 book, Persuasive Games: The Expressive Power of Videogames, where he introduced the idea of procedural rhetoric—a persuasive method based on the processes and rules embedded in a game's design, rather than through linear storytelling or audiovisual cues.

== History and origins ==
In the 1980s and 1990s, games like Oregon Trail and SimCity were used in classrooms to teach history and systems thinking. These games subtly introduced players to ideological assumptions about simulation and resource management.

== Design and mechanics ==
Persuasive games leverage interactive systems to simulate real-world processes and arguments. They differ from traditional media by requiring players to act within rule-bound environments, often experiencing consequences that provoke reflection or empathy.

Design techniques include:

- Procedural rhetoric: This approach embeds arguments into gameplay systems. For example, games about democracy can illuminate policy choices across taxation, healthcare, and civil rights, showing how political decisions create cascading social effects.
- Simulation and abstraction: By simplifying complex systems into game mechanics, designers introduce non-specialists into contexts players might not have experienced before, highlighting key challenges, tensions, or trade-offs. For example, The McDonald's Videogame by Molleindustria satirizes fast-food industry ethics, environmental impact, and marketing manipulation through simplified management gameplay.
- Moral and ethical dilemmas: Games like Papers, Please confront players with bureaucratic decisions that challenge their ethical reasoning, highlighting the human cost of dehumanized systems.
- Reward and punishment structures: Players often receive feedback that reflects the intended persuasive message. This feedback loop encourages reflection on the player's actions and their consequences within the game world.

Designers must balance persuasion with player agency. If a game feels too overtly manipulative or limits meaningful choice, players may resist its message. Conversely, games that offer too much freedom may dilute their persuasive impact.

== Criticisms ==
Persuasive games face several criticisms:

- Oversimplification of complex issues: To make systems playable, developers often abstract real-world dynamics. This can result in misleading representations or reinforce stereotypes. Critics argue that simulations may inadvertently encode ideological bias under the guise of neutrality.
- Ethical concerns about persuasion: Some scholars question the ethics of embedding persuasive messaging in entertainment. Players may not always be aware of the game's agenda.
- Varied effectiveness: Meta-analyses show mixed results. While many persuasive games increase awareness or short-term attitude change, sustained behavior change is less consistent. Scholars note that persuasive efficacy often depends on player engagement, message clarity, and context of play.
- Critiques of procedural rhetoric: Miguel Sicart (2011) argues that procedural rhetoric overlooks player interpretation and ethical dimensions of game design. He advocates for broader design strategies that consider aesthetics, emotions, and player reflection.

Some researchers, including Lee, Abdollahi, and Agur (2022), propose that persuasive impact is shaped by levels of involvement and immersion. This means the more emotionally and cognitively engaged a player is, the more likely they are to internalize the game’s message.

== See also ==
- Serious games
- Educational games
- Gamification
- Games for Change
- Simulation video game
- Health game
- Advergame
- Newsgame
- Impact games
- Digital storytelling
