= Cynthia Selfe =

American academic

Cindy Selfe
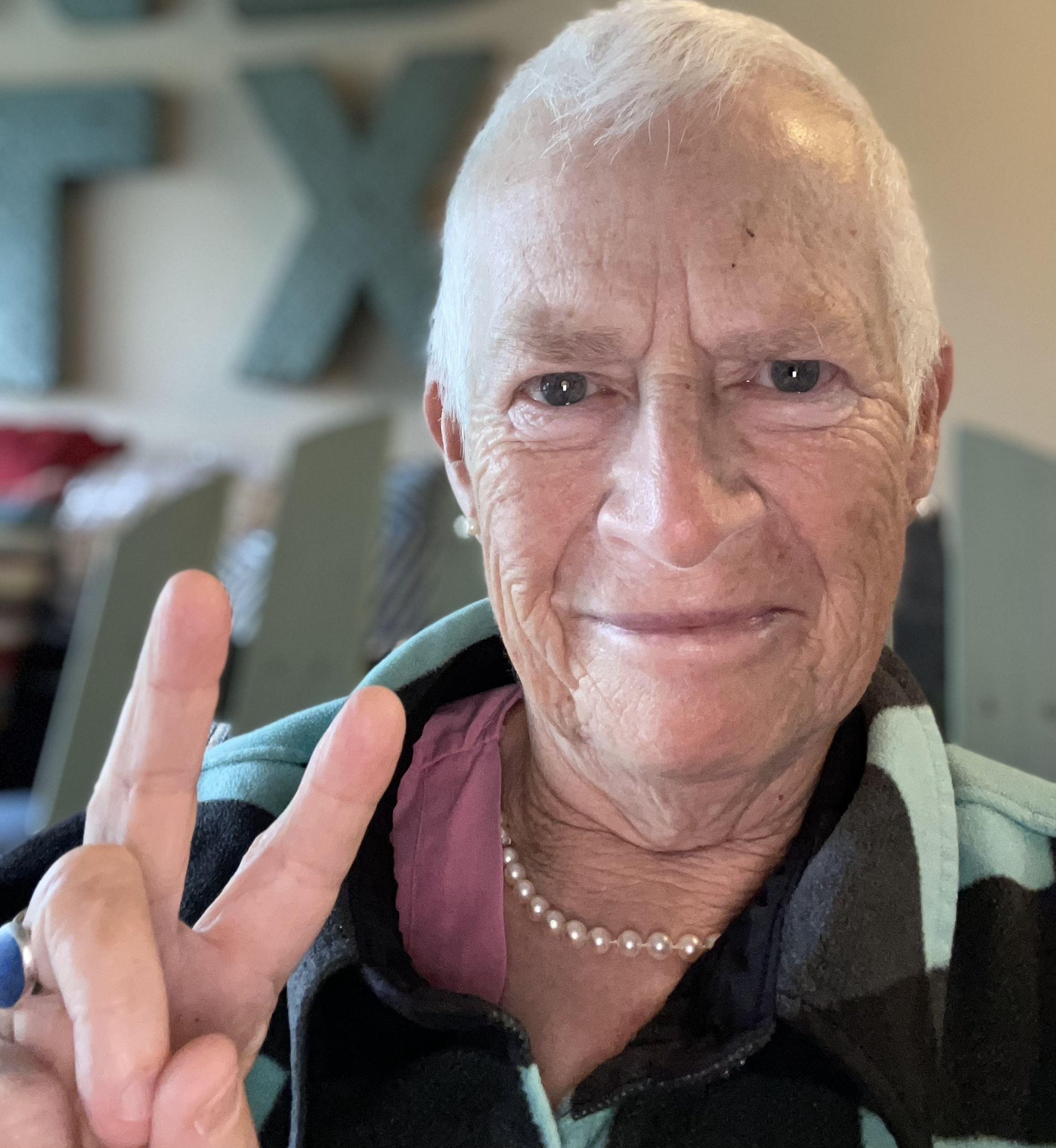
- Selfe in 2023
- Known for: Computer-mediated writing, Digital literacy

Academic background
- Education: University of Texas Austin

Academic work
- Discipline: English Studies, Computers and writing
- Institutions: Michigan Technological University, Ohio State University

Cynthia "Cindy" Selfe is an author, editor, scholar, and teacher in the field of Writing Studies, with a speciality in the subfield of computers and composition. She is Humanities Distinguished Professor Emerita in the English Department at the Ohio State University where she taught from 2006 until her retirement in 2016. Prior to that, she taught at Michigan Technological University. Selfe was the first woman and the first scholar from an English department to win the EDUCOM Medal for innovative computer use in higher education.

== Career ==
After graduating from the University of Wisconsin–Madison, Selfe taught English in middle school and high school in Houston, Texas. In 1976 she enrolled in the University of Texas for her doctorate, where she was taught by Rhetoric and Composition scholars such as James Kinneavy, Lester Faigley, Steve Witte, Maxine Hairston, and John Ruszkiewicz. Selfe went on to teach at Michigan Technological University, where, with Kathleen Kiefer, she founded the academic journal Computers and Composition. After joining the faculty of the English Department at the Ohio State University, Selfe co-directed their annual Digital Media and Composition institute (DMAC) and coordinated the program for Visiting Scholars in Digital Media and Composition. She founded Computers and Composition Digital Press with Gail Hawisher in 2007. Selfe also co-founded the Digital Archive of Literacy Narratives (DALN) with H. Loius Ulman, which houses over 3500 entires from authors around the world.

=== Computers and composition ===
Selfe's approach to the subfield of computers and composition has been described as "a focus on thinking through how technology complements and enriches classroom practices/pedagogical goals while simultaneously allowing for a shift from an instructor-centered classroom to a student-centered classroom." Selfe's publications focus on the human-computer interaction and the critical examination of technology on writing. She frequently notes that technology is not simply a tool for composing but also an influential force. In an interview for an academic journal, Selfe reflects on how the impact of computers were often misperceived when they first became more common in the classroom (in the 1980s and 1990s): "We only thought of technology as a prosthesis for what we already did. We didn’t see it as a way of changing what we didn’t know we could do." While Selfe frequently lauds the possibilities of digital tools for enriching education, she sees both positive and negative ramifications of technology. In 1999, early in the history of the online world, Selfe was skeptical about what she labeled "utopian" promises of the internet. She warned that the discourse (at the time) about the "internet revolution" erasing sexism, racism, and other systemic ills was misguiding people. To prove her point, she wrote about how digital texts replicate the same problems found "irl," specifically the exoticization of people of color and the norming of whiteness. Her recommended antidote is teaching analytical digital literacy.

=== Narrative ===
Selfe's interest in narrative permeates her public project, the Digital Archive of Literacy Narratives, as well as her scholarly work. For Selfe, literacy narratives complement statistics and experiments that give us a picture of the impact of literacy education. Selfe believes in "the informational value of these vernacular digital accounts for students and teachers of composition, as well as members of the public." She identifies three particular insights narratives give academic and public audiences:

1. understanding how identity formation is connected to literacy
2. understanding a wide range of cultural backgrounds' intersections with literacy
3. understanding the social and political agency that can be enacted through literacy

In her book Literate Lives in the Information Age, she and co-author Gail Hawisher formulate a matrix showing the various intersections of literacy—particularly digital literacy—and factors such as education, class, race, gender, and political affiliation. They use the matrix to analyze literacy stories of a representative range of Americans. Selfe and Hawisher expand this line of thinking to an international focus, or, as they term it, a "transnational" focus in their digital book Transnational Literate Lives in Digital Times, which explores literacy agency in stories from students who travel from their home countries to Western, English-speaking countries for higher education.

== Personal life ==
Cynthia Selfe is married to humanities scholar Richard "Dickie" Selfe; they have two dogs named Comal and Lupe (Guadalupe). When the couple retired, they took up residence in a cabin in Michigan.

== Awards ==
In Atlanta in 1999, Selfe delivered the chair's address to the Conference on College Composition and Communication, "Technology and Literacy: A Story about the Perils of Not Paying Attention." Soon after her chair's address, in 2000, Selfe and her frequent co-author Gail Hawisher won the Technology Innovator Award from the Conference on College Composition and Communication (CCCC) Committee on Computers in Composition and Communication.

In 2004, Selfe co-authored (with Gail Hawisher) the print book Literate Lives in the Information Age: Narratives of Literacy from the United States. Seven years later, Selfe and Hawisher added co-author Patrick Berry when they updated and reformatted that publication as a fully interactive online book-length text entitled Transnational Literate Lives in Digital Times. This digital publication received the CCCC Research Impact Award and CCCC Advancement Knowledge Award (2013) as well as CCCC Research Impact Award (2013).
