= Digital rhetoric =

Forms of communication via digital mediums

Digital rhetoric is communication that exists in the digital sphere. It can be expressed in many different forms, including text, images, videos, and software. Due to the increasingly mediated nature of contemporary society, distinctions between digital and non-digital environments are less clear. This has expanded the scope of digital rhetoric to account for the increased fluidity with which humans interact with technology.

The field of digital rhetoric is not yet fully established. It draws theory and practices from the tradition of rhetoric as both an analytical tool and a production guide. As a whole, it can be categorized as a meta-discipline.

Due to evolving study, digital rhetoric has held various meanings to different scholars over time. It can take on a variety of meanings based on what is being analyzed, depending on the concept, forms or objects of study, or rhetorical approach. Digital rhetoric can also be analyzed through the lenses of different social movements.

Digital rhetoric lacks a strict definition amongst scholars. The discussion and debate toward reaching a definition accounts for much of the writing, study, and teaching of the topic. One of the most straightforward definitions for "digital rhetoric" is that it is the application of rhetorical theory to digital communication..

In Digital Rhetoric: Theory, Method, Practice, Douglas Eyman explains how traditional rhetorical principles can be applied to digital communication and why new approaches are needed to understand digital media. He defines digital rhetoric as the study of how people create, communicate, and persuade through digital technologies. Digital texts include more than written words; they can combine images, videos, hyperlinks, sound, design, and interactive features to create meaning. Eyman emphasizes that digital rhetoric is an interdisciplinary field that connects rhetoric and writing with media studies, computer science, and digital humanities. He also explains that digital communication occurs within networks where messages can be shared, changed, and interpreted differently by different audiences.

Eyman organizes his discussion around theory, method, and practice. He explores how rhetorical theories can explain digital communication, how methods such as close reading, distant reading, content analysis, and data visualization can be used to study digital texts, and how rhetorical principles can guide the creation of digital compositions. He emphasizes that design and technology are not simply decorative elements but important parts of how digital messages communicate meaning and influence audiences. Ultimately, Eyman argues that digital rhetoric requires both traditional rhetorical knowledge and new approaches that account for the interactive, multimodal, and networked nature of digital environments.

Another topic Eyman explains that the concept that ethos, Intertextuality, and traditional rhetoric promote better and clear communication and persuasion tactics for online users. Credibility also known as ethos can cause some tension within the Internet. It is more difficult to trust an expertise of an author when topics are virtually. However, intertextuality allows online users to connect with one another by using references or specific text. This is seen in every day community when political advertisement plays on TV or even streaming platforms. This allows the audience to recognize these types of messages when presented. Eyman explains that not all types of rhetoric can be seen in the traditional methods and have to adapt to newer communication habits. One of them being simulations and digital media, which create a different form of communication.

Another example of digital rhetoric relates to gender stereotypes and advertising in the media. In Jean Kilbourne's essay, "Two Ways a Woman Can Get Hurt: Advertising and Violence," Kilbourne discusses how advertisements use rhetoric to sexualize women which reinforces harmful stereotypes. Images and messages that we see in our day to day life can ultimately influence our opinions. We see this happen often with digital spaces like social media. Advertisements are constantly shared and discussed through online platforms reaching large audiences. Comments and reactions that others leave online can further reinforce the sexist, demeaning stereotypes presented in these advertisements. Kilbourne's essay demonstrates that advertisements do not just sell products, but also influence cultural values.

== Definition ==
Early definitions of rhetoric from western classical/Greek and Roman times are "the art (techne) of finding out the available means of persuasion for a given argument," and "the practice of persuasive communication and a formal art of studying such communication." Traditional practices of rhetoric often involved methods that a person could use to construct persuasive speeches, whereas classical rhetoric was concerned with legal speeches, political speeches, and ceremonial speeches.

Rhetoric has developed alongside many technological developments, with digital mediums being amongst the most recent and transformative. There are many ancient and historical examples of "machine's to think with". Early examples of devices being used for the purpose of guiding thought include Martianus Capella's 9th century glossed collections of prose, philosophy and other writings, and the biblical concordances developed by monks between the 12th and 13th century. Some argue that types of man-made artwork and codes, such as ancient Egyptian hieroglyphics, were some of the first forms of digital rhetoric.

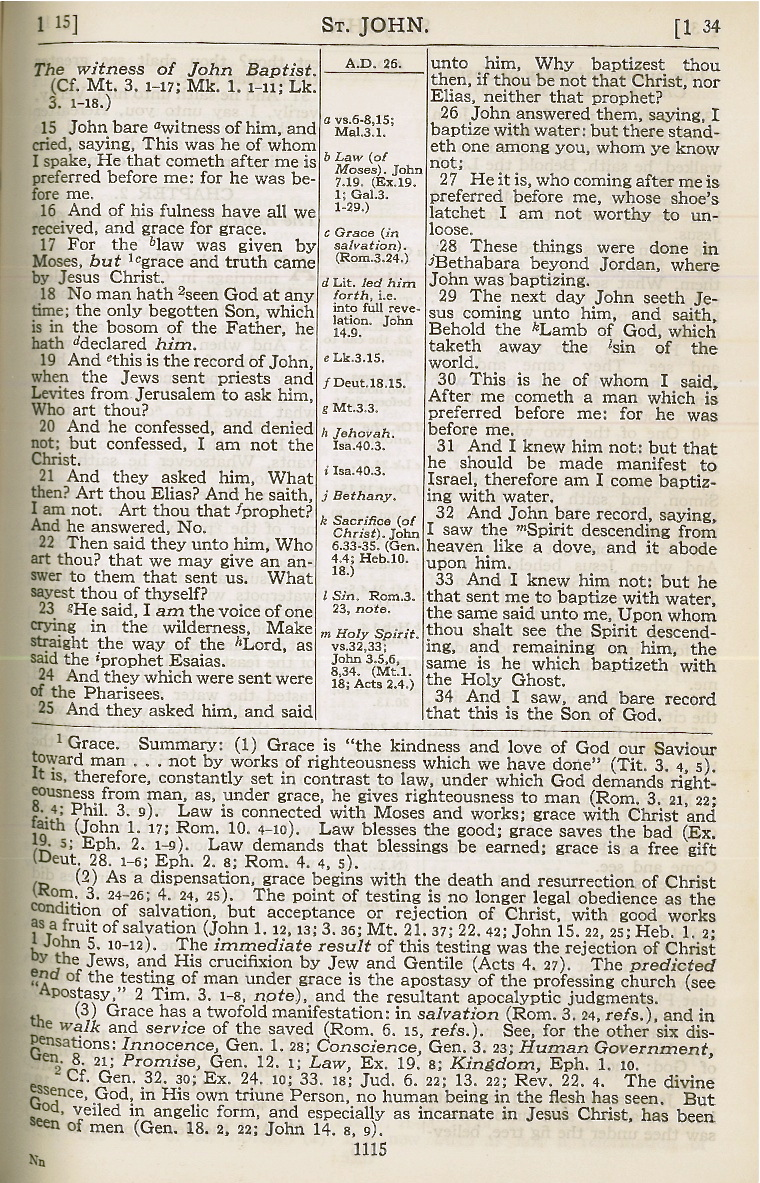
The Scofield Bible, which used annotations to explain portions of the text, and relate it to other portions of the book

In 1917, C.I Scofield created an annotated version of the King James Bible. This version of the bible would indicate passages that related to one another throughout both the Old and New Testaments, guiding the reader's interpretation of the work. These "connected topic concordances" are similar to "key-in context concordances" used on modern computers.

By the 1960s, early computers had become more prominent in many environments, and began seeing application outside of math and science. In 1964, Harvard's Allan B. Ellis published an analysis of how computers could be used to better understand literary works, through having text from The Adventures of Huckleberry plugged into punched cards and having the computer analyze the titular character. Between the mid-60's and early 70's, there were several experiments to investigate the potential for computers in the grading of academic papers. These computers were programmed to approximate the way that teachers generally approached the grading process, and judge the content in its quality of vocabulary, composition, and approach to the content.

=== Definition of digital rhetoric ===
==== Early definitions (1989–2015) ====
The term digital rhetoric was coined by rhetorician Richard A. Lanham in a 1989 lecture and was first published in his 1993 essay collection, The Electronic Word: Democracy, Technology, and the Arts. Lanham avoided coming to a firm definition, instead aiming to connect digital communication to examples from traditional communication, discussing the relationship between postmodern theory, digital arts, and classical rhetoric. Digital rhetoric theory is primarily based in traditional rhetoric and shares many of its methods and characteristics, including its status as a meta-discipline. Lanham's work referred to many works of Hypertext theory. Hypertext theory is a similar, but less broad concept to digital rhetoric, which studied the consequences of computer users interacting with hypertext links. Much of the writing on the theory focused on how the meaning that hypertext links gave to words and enforces a relationship between users and the particular words, and how this could be implemented in rhetorical and educational settings.

In 1997, Calgary University professor Doug Brent expanded on the concept of hypertext theory, approaching the topic from a rhetorical framework, when past studies depended more on literary analysis. This presented hypertext as a kind of "new rhetoric". The same year, Bowling Green University scholar Gary Heba united studies of hypertext and visual rhetoric into the concept of "HyperRhetoric", a multimedia communication experience that could not be replicated outside of an internet setting. Heba stated that as the online landscape and the perspectives of users change, HyperRhetoric must also adapt and evolve. This fluidity remains a characteristic of digital rhetoric.

The late 1990s and early 2000s represented a greater shift towards rhetoric in digital communication study, and how "persuasion" functions in an online setting. In 2005, Rensselaer Polytechnic Institute scholar James P. Zappen expanded the conversation beyond persuasion and into digital rhetoric's capacity for creative expression in exploring the behavior of individuals and groups in online settings.

==== Recent scholarship (2015–present) ====
In his 2015 book Digital Rhetoric: Theory, Method, Practice, Douglas Eyman argues that digital rhetoric is a distinct scholarly field––an emerging, interdisciplinary area of study that attempts to reconsider existing rhetorical theories and methods as it applies to new digital texts and technologies. He argues that digital rhetoric extends beyond textual analysis to include multimodal composing, networked communication, and digital production. Eyman also emphasizes that teaching digital rhetoric requires integrating design, interactivity, and critical awareness of digital infrastructures into writing instruction.

Eyman outlines what he believes to be the three core terms central to any discussion on digital rhetoric––"rhetoric," "digital," and "text". Beginning with "rhetoric," he compares views on rhetoric from the Western Classical period through to the modern day. Moving on to "digital," he believes that this "provides a bridge between textual production (broadly defined to include multimedia) and rhetoric." Ending with "text," he argues that an expanded understanding of "text" is required, as digital text can be multimedia and/ or interactive, with technology and users shaping it throughout its production and reception. Finally, Eyman concludes the chapter by suggesting the development of new ways of understanding the relationship between technology and communication.

By this definition, digital rhetoric can be applied as an analytic method for digital content and be a basis for future study, offering rhetorical questions as research guidelines. Eyman categorized the emerging field of digital rhetoric as interdisciplinary in nature, related to fields including digital literacy, visual rhetoric, new media, human–computer interaction, and critical code studies.

Eyman further attempts to explain in chapter one what digital rhetoric is, but realizes that digital rhetoric can mean something different to every field because it can be used in several contexts, such as a college class, a research paper, or even a blog. So instead of defining digital rhetoric, he attempts to connect digital rhetoric to other professions like writing, communications, and media studies to continue expanding the concept of digital rhetoric. Because he believes that if he defines what digital rhetoric is he will limit the possibilities digital rhetoric can have. Overall, digital rhetoric examines how rhetorical theories can be used to understand digital texts like social media posts, blogs, and even websites.

In chapter two of Digital Rhetoric:Theory, Method, Practice, Douglas Eyman outlines the theoretical foundations of digital rhetoric by stressing the importance of taking the theories of classical rhetors and using them as a foundational base. He then furthers this mapping by highlighting the importance of having the ideas of the Sophists merge with digital rhetoric into a "Third Sophistic Cyborg." This merged entity will, in Eyman's estimation, act as a decentralized teacher that will easily navigate across digital networks to provide knowledge to all, much in the manner of the classical Sophists of Ancient Greece.

Eyman then draws multiple connections between the five canons and their digital practice analogs. Invention is represented by the searches conducted through networks and their interactions with multimodality, arrangement deals with the manipulation of digital media, style deals with an understanding of design elements, delivery is knowledge of digital distribution, and finally, memory has to do with the encoding and retrieval of information.

Another idea central to this chapter is that of digital ecologies, or how humans, text, and the technology itself all interact with one another within the context of a digital network. Eyman believes in the idea of all elements acting in conjunction with one another as opposed to siloed processes, bringing up the concept of the digital network as a kinetic system that is constantly in motion and progressing with those who are affecting it. Within this larger system, Eyman also saw smaller ecosystems that serve as differentiated platforms that disseminate information, such as social media platforms. Circulation within these systems was also important to Eyman, particularly regarding the velocity of the information and how it is repurposed and mutated by the actors within the community.

Finally, the limitations on such ecosystems regardless of size trace back to common issues seen in traditional rhetoric, such as intellectual property concerns, hostile UI design, and improper preservation.

Chapter three of Eyman’s 2015 book Digital Rhetoric: Theory, Method, Practice, which explores Digital Rhetorical Methods, discusses how different modalities of digital rhetoric influence the way it is structured, and closely examining computers and professional writing can help identify how methodology and messaging influence one another. Eyman goes on to explain the importance of close and distant reading as tools for analyzing digital rhetorical methodology and identifying the foundation for understanding the larger body of methods employed in rhetoric stemming from a series of cultural and historical contexts. He further develops the idea that as technology changes and develops, so too do the methods of communication change, and as such, research methods should reflect these shifts. Eyman highlights the need for research methods that consider the user as well as the system, and how the interactions between the two influence the norms and practices within digital rhetoric. Eyman then goes on to list a variety of methods for tracking these interactions, which include mapping the strength of interactions between two individuals, graphing web traffic, and tracking the ubiquity of different hyperlinks. Eyman places a strong emphasis on the visual elements of digital rhetoric and outlines how these research methods should also take into consideration the abstract, conceptual, complex, and interrelated nature of digital rhetoric. In the end of chapter three, he notes that accessibility, which is impeded by paywalls and the generally transient nature of the internet, will be an obstacle that must be addressed as the study of digital rhetoric develops.

In 2018, rhetorician Angela Haas offered her own definition of digital rhetoric, defining it as "the digital negotiation of information – and its historical, social, economic, and political contexts and influences – to affect change". Haas emphasized that digital rhetoric does not solely apply to text-based items—it can also apply to image-based or system-based items. In this way, any form of communication that occurs in the digital sphere can be counted as digital rhetoric. Stuart A. Selber emphasized the need to adapt traditional rhetorical frameworks to address uniquely digital contexts, proposing guiding questions for future research.

==== AI scholarship ====
In the 2020s, scholarship on digital rhetoric increasingly focused on artificial intelligence (AI) as both a communicative resource and as an object of rhetorical study. Scholars Zoltan P. Majdik and S. Scott Graham introduced the concept of a “rhetoric of/with AI,” situating AI within broader developments including computational rhetoric and digital humanities.

AI scholarship in digital rhetoric is interdisciplinary and focuses on areas such as writing, authorship, and the relationship between human and machine-generated discourse. Annette Vee argues that while AI is changing writing practices, uncertainty and critical engagement remain central to writing pedagogy. Ethan Mollick characterizes human-AI interaction as a collaborative partnership in the production of texts.

Critical AI scholarship has examined the limitations, biases, and power relations shaping digital environments. Kate Crawford, in Atlas of AI, analyzes the ethical and material dimensions of AI, while Safiya Umoja Noble, in Algorithms of Oppression, addresses how algorithmic systems reinforce gender and racial biases. Emily Bender and colleagues raise concerns about limitations of large language models including biased output, environmental costs and social impacts. Chaoran Wang and Zhaozhe Wang have also examined the need for critical AI literacy for second-language writers in transnational contexts.

Recent initiatives such as the Sweetland Digital Rhetoric Collaborative (2023-2024), further integrate AI and writing pedagogy. These developments extend digital rhetoric to include ethics and structural considerations, highlighting how communication is shaped, influenced and interpreted in AI-mediated environments. It also demonstrates that digital rhetoric is evolving beyond its initial focus on hypertext and multimodality, toward a broader engagement with AI, institutional literacies, and global rhetorical traditions.

=== Other definitions ===
While most research represents a traditionally Western view of rhetoric, Arthur Smith of UCLA explains that the ancient rhetoric of many cultures, such as African rhetoric, existed independent of Western influence, and developed in ways that reflect the values and functions of those societies. Today, rhetoric encompasses all forms of discourse that serve any given purpose within specific contexts, while also being shaped by those contexts.

Some scholars interpret this rhetorical discourse with greater focus on the digital aspect. University of Texas's Casey Boyle, Rutgers University-Camden's James Brown Jr., and University of Virginia's Steph Ceraso claim that "the digital" is no longer a single strategy that can be used to enhance traditional rhetoric, but an "ambient condition" that encompass all parts of life. As technology has become more ubiquitous, the lines between traditional and digital rhetoric have blurred. Technology and rhetoric can influence and transform each other.

== Concepts ==
=== Circulation ===
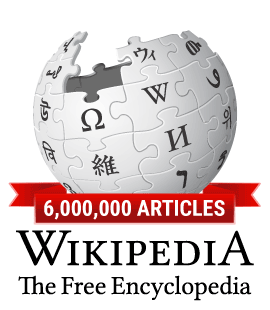
As an example of circulation, Wikipedia is an online encyclopedia that relies on collaborative rhetorical contribution

Circulation theorizes the ways that text and discourse moves through time and space, and any kind of media can be circulated. A new form of communication is composed, created, and distributed through digital technologies. Media scholar Henry Jenkins explains there is a shift from distribution to circulation, which signals a move toward an increasingly participatory model of culture in which people shape, share, re-frame, and remix media content in ways not previously possible within the traditional rhetorical formats like print. The various concepts of circulation include:

- Collaboration – Digital rhetoric has taken on a very collaborative nature through the use of digital platforms. Sites such as YouTube and Wikipedia involve opportunity for "new forms of collaborative production". Digital platforms have created opportunities for more people to enact and create, as digital platforms open doors for collaborative communication that can occur synchronously, asynchronously, over far distances, and across multiple disciplines and professions.
- Crowdsourcing – Daren Brabham describes the concept of crowdsourcing as the use of modern technology to collaborate, create, and solve problems collectively. Ethical concerns have been raised while engaging in crowdsourcing, specifically in situations that lack a clear set of compensation practices or protections in place to secure information.
- Delivery – Digital technologies allow rhetoric to be delivered in new "electronic forms of discourse". Acts and modes of communication can be represented digitally by combining multiple different forms of media into a composite helping to create an easy user experience. The growing popularity of the Internet meme is an example of combining, circulating, and delivering media in a collaborative effort through file sharing. Although memes are sent through microtransactions they often have a macro-level, large-scale impact. Another form of rhetorical delivery are encyclopedias, which traditionally were printed and based primarily on text and images. However, modern technological developments now enable online encyclopedias to integrate sound, animation, video, algorithmic search functions, and high-level productions into a cohesive multimedia experience as part of their new forms of digital rhetoric.

=== Critical literacy ===
Critical literacy is the ability to identify bias in media, under the assumption that all media is biased. It can also be defined as a communicative tool to lead to social change and promote social action by using a critical lens when approaching social-political topics. In order to identify bias amid the immense volume of information imposed on digital audiences, individuals need to develop the ability to process and critically examine content—on both familiar and unfamiliar topics.

In an essay on critical literacy in writing, the University of Melbourne stated the importance of developing these skills through reading and questioning what texts are trying to accomplish. Ultimately, this allows an idea's interpretation to come from the reader, not the writer.

For example, a study conducted at the Indiana University in Bloomington used algorithms to assess 14 million Twitter messages containing statements about the 2016 U.S. presidential campaign and election. They found that from May 2016 to March 2017, social bots were responsible for causing approximately 389,000 unsupported political claims to go viral.

=== Interactivity ===
Interactivity in digital rhetoric can be defined as the ways in which readers connect to and communicate with digital texts. This includes activity between the audience, the audience and the message being sent, the audience and the medium, and the communication between separate mediums. Readers have the ability to like, share, repost, comment on, and remix online content. These interactions allow writers, scholars, and content creators to get a better idea of how their work is affecting their audience.

Some ways communicators promote interactivity include the following:

- Mind sharing is the methods and components of communication that collective intelligence is gathered and transferred. It is based in the sharing of emotional, knowledge-based, and goal-based sharing. The human ability of language is the primary example of mind-sharing. Mind sharing functions as a method of concept sharing, presenting generally agreed upon meanings for words and phrases, and concept activation sharing, where these specific meanings prompt reactions when communicated.
- Multimodality is a form of communication that uses multiple methods (or modes) to inform audiences of an idea. It can involve a mix of written text, pictures, audio, or videos. These communications offer a wealth of information that could not be accessed from traditional methods, but are disorganized and can be difficult to reach conclusions from. All writing and all communication is, theoretically, multimodal.
- Remix is a method of digital rhetoric that manipulates and transforms an original work to convey a new message. The use of remix can help the creator make an argument by connecting seemingly unrelated ideas into a convincing whole. As modern technology develops, self-publication sites such as YouTube, SoundCloud, and WordPress have stimulated remix culture, allowing for easier creation and dissemination of reworked content. Unlike appropriation, which is the use and potential recontextualization of existing material without significant modification, 'remix' is defined by Ridolfo and Devoss as "the process of taking old pieces of text, images, sounds, and video and stitching them together to form a new product". A popular example of remixing is the creation and sharing of memes.

=== Procedural rhetoric ===
Procedural rhetoric is rhetoric formed through processes or practices. Some scholars view video games as one of these processes through which rhetoric can be formed. For example, ludology scholar and game designer Gonzalo Frasca poses that the simulation-nature of computers and video games offers a "natural medium for modeling reality and fiction". Therefore, according to Frasca, video games can take on a new form of digital rhetoric in which reality is mimicked but also created for the future. Similarly, scholar Ian Bogost argues that video games can serve as models for how 'real-world' cultural and social systems operate. They also argue for the necessity of literacy in playing video games as this allows players to challenge (and ultimately accept or reject) the rhetorical standpoints of these games.

=== Rhetorical velocity ===
Rhetorical velocity is the concept of authors writing in a way in which they are able to predict how their work might be recomposed. Scholars Jim Ridolfo and Danielle DeVoss first coined this idea in 2009 when they described rhetorical velocity as "a conscious rhetorical concern for distance, travel, speed, and time, pertaining specifically to theorizing instances of strategic appropriation by a third party". Author Sean Morey agrees with this definition of rhetorical velocity and describes it as a creator anticipating the response their work with generate.

For example, digital rhetoric is often labelled using tags, which are keywords used to help readers find, view, and share relevant texts and information. These tags can be found on blog posts, news articles, scholarly journals, and more. Tagging allows writers, scholars, and content creators to organize their work and make it more accessible and understandable to readers.

Appropriation carries both positive and negative connotations for rhetorical velocity. In some ways, appropriation is a tool that can be used for the reapplication of outdated ideas to make them better. In other ways, appropriation is seen as a threat to creative and cultural identities. Social media receives the bulk of this scrutiny due to the lack of education of its users. Most "contributors are often unaware of what they are contributing", which perpetuates the negative connotation. Scholars in digital rhetoric—such as Jessica Reyman, Amy Hea, and Johndan Johnson-Eilola—explore this topic and its effects on society. Scholars have also connected the role of rhetorical velocity to visual rhetoric through a study of environmental image circulation, demonstrating that "while environmental image circulation is often viewed as an ambivalent, or even performative, practice for environmental citizenship, it is also an important space for cultivating participatory culture online."

=== Visual rhetoric ===
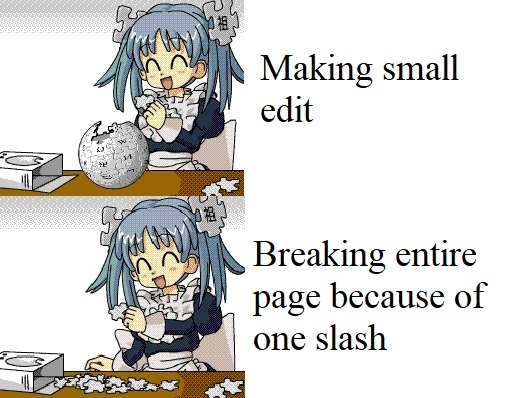
First, an "initial" meme is created to illustrate some joke or idea.

Digital rhetoric often invokes visual rhetoric due to digital rhetoric's reliance on visuals. Charles Hill states that images "do not necessarily have to portray an object, or even a class of objects, that exists or ever did exist" to remain impactful. However, the use of imagery for rhetorical purposes in digital spaces cannot always be easily differentiated from "traditional" physical visual mediums. As such, approaching this concept requires a careful analysis of the viewer, situational, and visual contexts involved. A prominent part of this concept is its intersection of perspective with technology, as computers allow users to create a curated view for online space. Examples of the Internet relying and reshaping visual rhetoric include Social media platforms like Instagram, and incredibly realistic deepfakes.

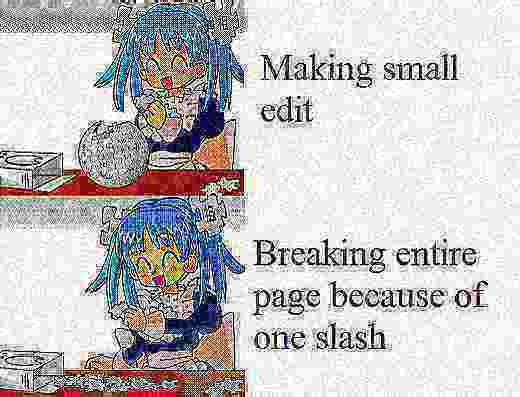
Then, another user modifies the original to illustrate their own idea; in this image, a "deep fried" effect is added to distort the image.

Digitally-produced art is a significant way users express themselves on technological platforms; the unique intersection of text and image has given rise to new rhetorical language through the modification of slang and in-group language. In particular, the culturally-specific and nuanced use of pop culture references through Internet memes have gradually built upon themselves to create complex, highly flexible, and Internet-specific (or even platform-specific) dialects of speech. Through popularity-based natural selection, edits of commonly accepted meme templates fuel the cycle of rhetorical creation.

Other forms of digital-visual rhetoric include remixing and parodying. In the chapter "Digital Rhetoric Practice" in Digital Rhetoric Theory, Method, Practice, Douglas Eyman speaks about the growth of digital rhetoric in a digital world. Digital rhetoric has become distinguished from its other rhetoric counterparts, as it is an easily accessible path for people to spread their messages through the reuse of already existing content and putting their own twist on it. This is widespread because of meme cultures and online video platforms.

The default skin tone for emojis is yellow

Digital-visual rhetoric does not only rely on intentional manipulation. Sometimes, meanings can arise from unexpected places and otherwise-overlooked features. For example, emojis can carry heavy consequences by permeating daily communication. Varying skin tones provided (or excluded) by developers for emojis may perpetuate preexisting racial biases of colorism. Even otherwise-innocuous images of peaches and eggplants are regular stand-ins for genital regions; they can be both harmless modes of flirtation and tools for sexually harassing women online when sent en masse.

The concept of the avatar also illustrates visual rhetoric's deeply personal impact, particularly when using Miami University scholar James E. Porter's definition of the avatar as an extended "virtual body". While scholars such as Beth Kolko hoped for an equitable online world free of physical barriers, social issues still persist in digital realms, such as gender discrimination and racism. For example, Victoria Woolums found that, in the video game World of Warcraft, an avatar's gender identity instigated bias from other characters even though an avatar's gender identity may not be physically accurate to its user. These relationships are further complicated by the varying degrees of anonymity characterizing inter-user communications in online spaces. While the possibility of true privacy can be facilitated by impersonal avatars, they are still personal manifestations of a user's self in the context of digital spaces. Furthermore, the tools available to curate and express these are platform-dependent and ripe for both liberation and exploitation. In circumstances such as Gamergate or debates regarding influencer culture and their portrayals of impossible and computer-edited body image, self-presentation is heavily mediated by accessibility to and mastery of online avatars.

== Forms and objects of study ==
=== Infrastructure ===
Information infrastructure is the underlying organization of public information on the Internet, which impacts how and what the public accesses online. Databases and search engines are information infrastructure as they play a large role in access to and dissemination of information. Information Infrastructure often consists of algorithms and metadata standards, which curate the information presented to the public.

==== Software ====
Coding and software engineering are not often recognized as rhetorical writing practices, but in the process of writing code, people instruct machines to "make arguments and judgments and address audiences both mechanic and human". Technologies themselves can be viewed as rhetorical genres, simultaneously guiding users' experiences and communication with each other and being shaped and improved through humans use. Choices baked into software that are invisible to users impact the user experience and reveal information about the priorities of the software engineers. For instance, while Facebook allows users to choose over 50 gender identities to display on their public profile, an investigation into the social media's software revealed that users are filtered into the male-female gender binary within the database for targeted advertising purposes. For another example, pieces of software called BitTorrent trackers facilitate the massive distribution of information on Wikipedia. Software facilitates the collective rhetorical action of this encyclopedia.

The field of software studies encourages the investigation into and recognition of software's impacts on people and culture.

=== People ===
==== Online communities ====
Online communities are groups of people with common interests that interact and engage over the Internet. Many online communities are found within social networking sites, online forums, and chat rooms, such as Facebook, Twitter, Reddit, and 4chan, where members can share and discuss information and inquiries. These online spaces often establish their own rules, norms, and culture, and in some cases, users will adopt community-specific terminology or phrases.

Scholars have noted that online communities have especially gained prominence among users like e-patients and victim-survivors of abuse. Within online health and support groups respectively, members have been able to find others who share similar experiences, receive advice and emotional support, and record their own narrative.

Online communities support community but in some cases can support polarization. Communities face issues with online harassment in the form of trolling, cyberbullying, and hate speech. According to the Pew Research Center, 41% of Americans have experienced some form of online harassment with 75% of these experiences occurring over social media. Another area of concern is the influence of algorithms on delineating the online communities a user comes in contact with. Personalizing algorithms can tailor a user's experience to their analytically determined preference, which creates a "filter bubble". The user loses agency in content accessibility and information dissemination when these bubbles are created. The loss of agency can lead to polarization, but recent research indicates that individual level polarization is rare. Most polarization is due to the influx of users with extreme views that can encourage users to move towards partisan fringes from "gateway communities".

==== Social media ====
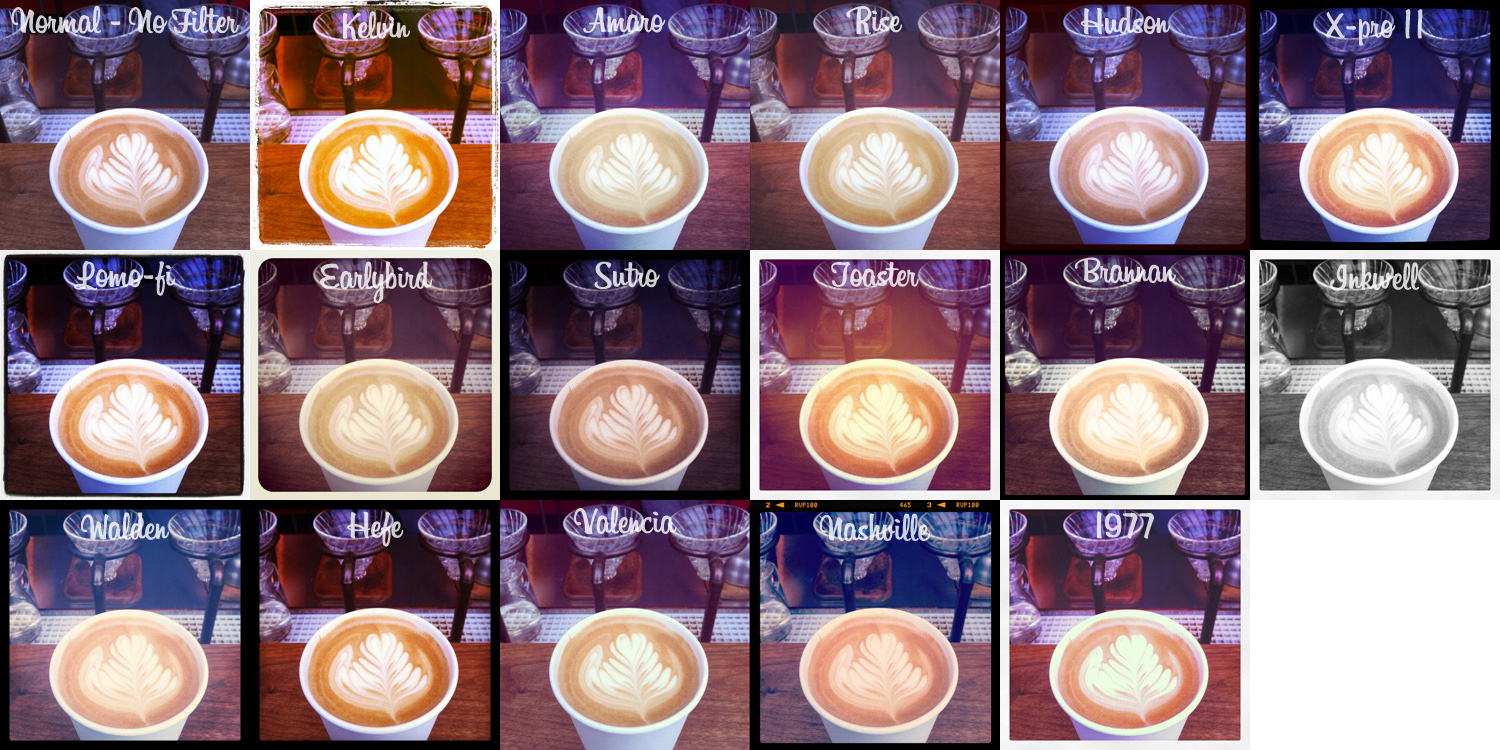
A demonstration of Instagram filters

Social media makes human connection formal, manageable, and profitable to social media companies. The technology that promotes this human connection is not human, but automated. As people use social media and form their experiences on the platforms to meet their interests, the technology also affects how the users interact with each other and the world.

Social media also allows for the weaving of "offline and online communities into integrated movements". Users' actions, such as liking, commenting, sending, retweeting, or saving a post, contribute to the algorithmic customization of their personalized content. Social media's reach is determined by these algorithms. Social media also offers various image altering tools that can impact image perception—making the platform less human and more automated.

===== Digital activism =====
Digital activism serves an agenda-setting function as it can influence mainstream media and news outlets. Hashtags, which curate posts with similar themes and ideas into a central location on a digital platform, aid in bringing exposure to social and political issues. The subsequent discussions these hashtags create put pressure on private institutions and governments to address these issues, as can be seen with movements like #CripTheVote, #BringBackOurGirls, or #MeToo. Many recent social movements have originated on Twitter, as Twitter Topic Networks provide a framework for online community organizing. Digital activism allows people who may have not had a voice previously an equal chance to be heard.

Though some believe that digital activism has a universal function, it takes different forms and philosophies in different parts of the world. In some parts of the world, it takes on a "techno-political" approach, basing communications off of broad political, social, and economic trends, relying on technology prevalent in the free culture movement. Others take a "techno-pragmatic" philosophy, focused more on the specific political and social goal, often at a more personal level. Some areas remain "techno-fragmented", where there are few intersections between traditional and digital forms of activism.

===== Influencers and content creators =====
As social media is increasingly becoming more available, the influencer/content creator position has also become recognized as a profession. With such a large and rapid consumer presence on social media, it creates both a helpful and overwhelming source of consumer information for advertisers. There is substantial potential to identify "market mavens" on social media due to fandom culture and the nature of influencer/content creator followings. Social media has opened up business opportunities for corporations to employ influencer marketing, where they can more easily find suitable influencers to advertise their products to their viewers.

==== Online learning ====
Although online learning existed previously, its prevalence increased during the COVID-19 pandemic. Online learning platforms are known as e-learning management systems (ELMS). They allow both students and teachers access to a shared, digital space which includes classroom resources, assignments, discussions, and social networking through direct messaging and email. Although socialization is a component of ELMS, not all students utilize these resources; rather, they focus on the lecturer as the primary resource of knowledge. The long-term effects of emergency online learning, which many turned to during the height of the pandemic, is ongoing; however, one study concluded that students' "motivation, self-efficacy, and cognitive engagement decreased after the transition".

=== Interactive media ===
==== Video games ====
The procedural and interactive nature of video games leads them to be rich examples of procedural rhetoric. This rhetoric can range from games designed to bolster children's learning to challenging one's assumptions of their world. An educational video game developed for students at the University of Texas at Austin, titled Rhetorical Peaks, was made with the goal of examining rhetoric's procedural nature and to capture the constantly changing contexts of rhetoric. The open-ended nature of the game, as well as the developer's intent on playing the game within a classroom setting, encouraged collaboration among students and the development of individual interpretations of the game's plot based on vague clues; this ultimately helped them to realize that there must be a willingness to change between lines of thought and to work both within and beyond accepted limits in understanding rhetoric.

The Xbox network, an example of virtual communication between real life and online friends that is embedded in the gaming console

In mainstream gaming, each game has its own set of language which help shape the way information is transferred between players in their community. Within the realm of online gaming—which includes games such as Call of Duty or League of Legends—players can communicate with each other and create their own rhetoric within the established world of the game, which allows players to influence and be influenced by the other gamers around them.

==== Podcasting ====
Podcasting is another form of digital rhetoric. Podcasting can augment the ancient progymnasmata in ways that illuminate the relationship between rhetoric and digital sound. Podcasting can teach rhetorical practices through soundwriting. And a rhetorical pedagogy oriented around narrative nonfiction podcasting may—if it can overcome some key limitations—hold the potential to spark social change.

==== Mobile applications ====
Mobile applications (apps) are computer programs designed specifically for mobile devices, such as phones or tablets. Mobile apps cater to a wide range of audiences and needs, and allow for a "cultural hybridity of habit" which allows anyone to stay connected with anyone, anywhere. Due to this, there is always access to changing cultures and lifestyles, since there are so many different apps available to research or publish work. Furthermore, mobile apps allow individual users to manage aspects of their lives, while the apps themselves are able to change and upgrade socially.

Information access on mobile devices poses challenges to user interfaces, notably due to the small screen and keys (or lack thereof), in comparison to larger counterparts such as laptops and PCs. However, it also has the advantage of heightening physical interactivity with touch, and presents experiences with multiple senses in this way. Likewise, mobile technologies offer location-based affordances for layering different types of information in communication design. With these varying factors, mobile applications need trustworthy, reliable, and helpful UI design and UX design to create successful user experience.

==== Immersive media ====
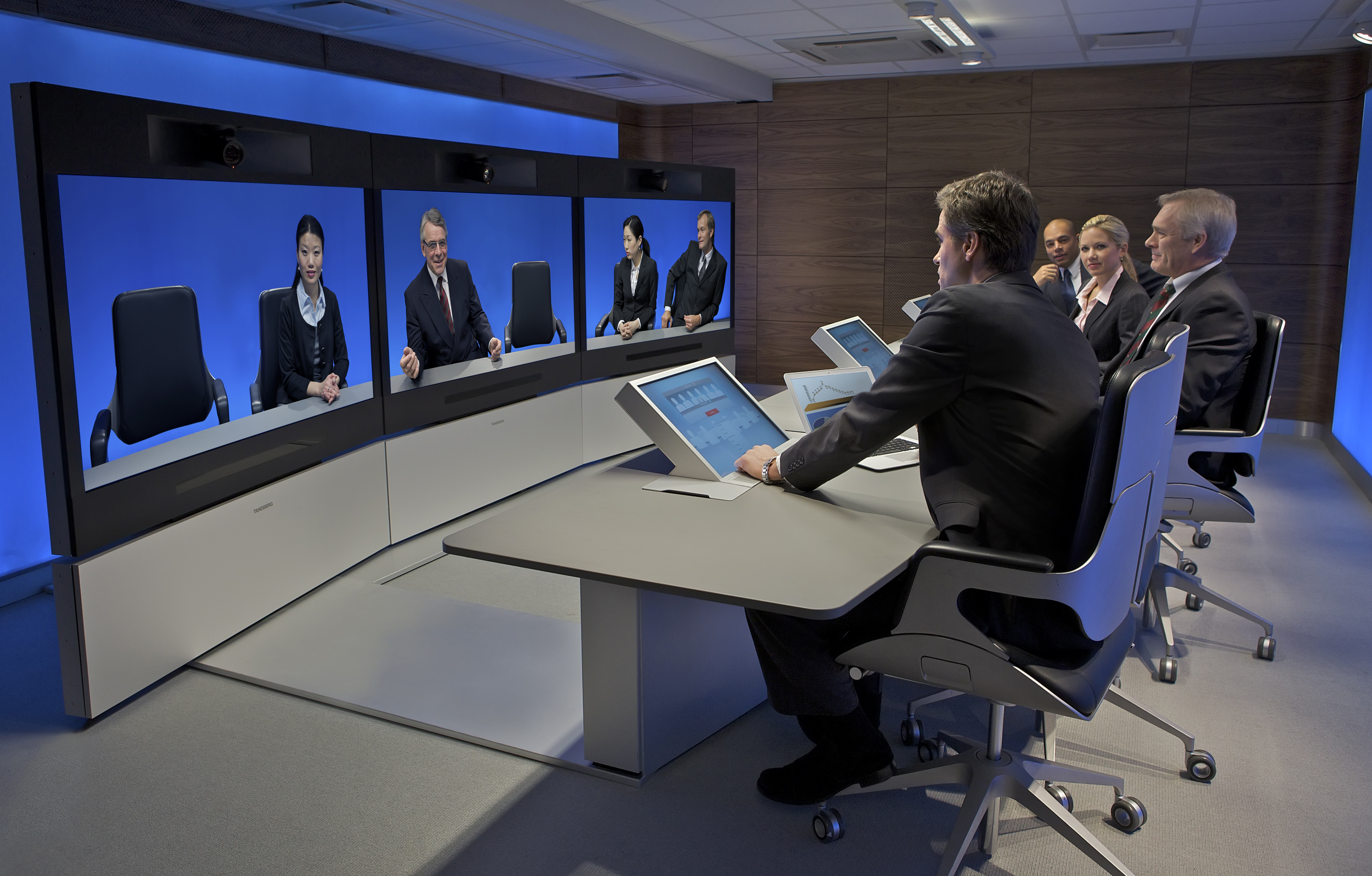
Telepresence utilized in a professional setting for meetings

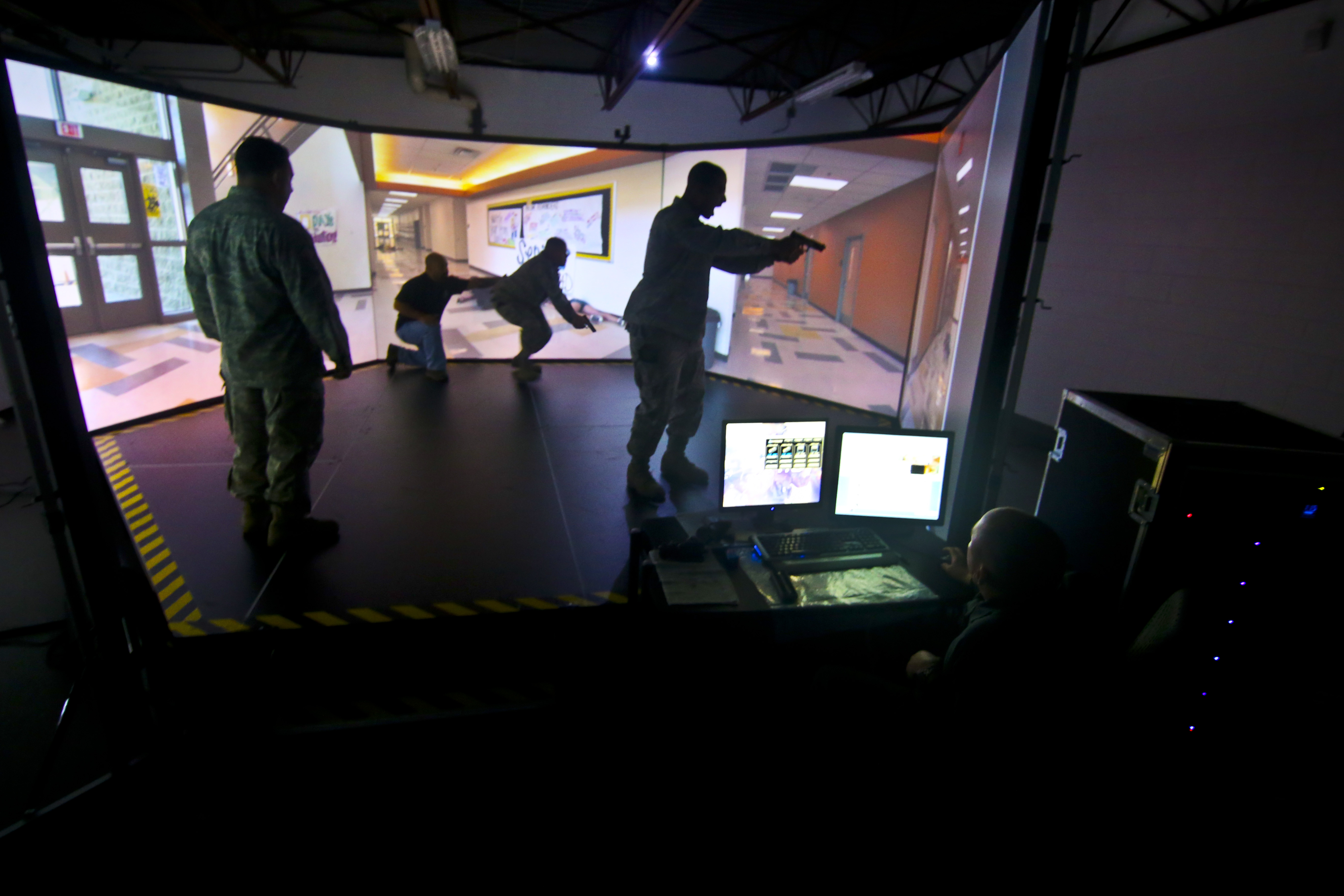
Members of the military using a virtual reality display for training

Emerging immersive technologies such as virtual reality remove the visual presence of devices and mimic emotional experiences. User immersion into virtual reality includes simulated real-life communication; virtual reality provides the illusion of being somewhere the body physically is not, which contributes to widespread communication that reaches the point of telepresence and telexistence. Digital museums, serious games, and interactive documentaries often utilize virtual reality and augmented reality elements to relate users to historical settings and events, to teach them about the topic or to inform them of a specific point of view. While these are useful in conveying information in an immersive setting with an accessible narrative, those narratives can simplify the context to a point where some of the nuance is lost. Museums that employ immersive exhibits often find that tourist engage with these for the purpose of leisure, rather than wanting to gain thorough learning experience.

== Critical approaches ==
=== Technofeminism ===
Digital rhetoric gives a platform to technofeminism, a concept that brings together the intersections of gender, capitalism, and technology. Technofeminism advocates for equality for women in technology-heavy fields and researches the relationship between women and their devices. Intersectionality is a term coined by Kimberlé Crenshaw that recognizes the societal injustices based on our identities. It is often challenging for women to navigate finding and interacting in digital spaces without harassment or gender biases. There is an importance of digital activism for unrepresented communities, such as gender non-conforming and transgender people of all races, disabled people, and people of color.

Technofeminism and intersectionality are still not very prevalent when developing new technologies and research. In the journal Computers and Composition, only five articles explicitly use the term intersectionality or technofeminism. Online feminism also faces challenges of reactive sexism and misogyny. In one example, of the over 600 million internet users in India, 63% users are male, with 39% being female. This contrast in users often makes these heavily male digital spaces hostile to women. While some feminist social media movements are able to inspire policy change or shine a light on issues facing women, others have been subject to severe backlashes with few achievements to show as a result, even if the movement reaches a wide audience.

=== Rhetorical feminism ===
Cheryl Glenn, in her article "The Language of Rhetorical Feminism, Anchored in Hope", explores the study of rhetoric, feminism, and hope, introducing a theoretical framework she calls "rhetorical feminism". This framework began as a platform for recognizing and valuing the traditionally overlooked rhetorical practices and powers of marginalized groups called "Others". Glenn's approach is meant to challenge biased attitudes and actions, and promote a what some consider an inclusive and tolerant societal discourse.

In connection to digital rhetoric, the article underscores the power of digital platforms in their ability to either facilitate or obstruct democratic dialogues. Glenn acknowledges the influence of rhetoric across traditional and digital domains to challenge systems seen as unjust and engage individuals in democratic practices. Glenn's stance within the article aligns with the broader narrative of digital rhetoric, which often explores the dynamics of power, representation, and access to digital platforms in molding public discourse.

=== Embodiment ===
Embodiment is the idea that every person has a unique relationship with technology based on their unique set of identities. Studying the relationship between bodies and technology is one way that digital rhetoricians are able to promote equal access and opportunity within the digital sphere. Since technology is considered to be an extension of the real world, users are also shaped by the experiences they have in digital spaces. The artificial interactions that occur in online environments allow users to exist in a way that is additive to their human experience.

Scholars such as Douglas Eyman describe digital rhetoric as “the application of rhetorical theory (as analytic method or heuristic for production) to digital texts and performances.” Building on that foundation, more recent research has explored how algorithms influence communication in digital spaces. Works by Safiya Umoja Noble and Taina Bucher examine how search engines and social-media platforms quietly guide what information people see, shaping attention and interpretation in ways that carry ethical and political weight.

=== Pedagogy ===
With digital rhetoric becoming increasingly present, pedagogical approaches have been proposed by scholars to teach digital rhetoric in the classroom. Courses in digital rhetoric study the intersectionality between users and digital material, as well as how different backgrounds such as age, ethnicity, and gender can affect these interactions. Studies of digital pedagogy function as insight into the advantages and disadvantages of implementing digital technology in to education settings, and the consequences of incorrect use. Examples include electronic libraries and databases, as well as "thinking tools" used by students for the purposes of transcription, editing, and tagging of works. Digital pedagogy is a wider scope of study than online pedagogy, focusing not only on the internet, but also on the devices and mediums of that convey the online communication.

==== Higher education ====
Several scholars teach digital rhetoric courses at universities in the US, although their approaches vary considerably. Jeff Grabill, a scholar with a background in English, education, and technology, encourages his contemporaries to find a bridge between the scholarly field of digital rhetoric and its implementation. Another rhetorician, Cheryl Ball, specializes in areas that consist of multimodal composition and editing practices, digital media scholarship, digital publishing, and university writing pedagogy. Ball teaches students to write and compose multimodal texts by analyzing rhetorical options and choosing the most appropriate genres, technologies, media, and modes for a particular situation. Multimodality also influenced Understanding Rhetoric: A Graphic Guide to Writing by Elizabeth Losh (et al.), which emphasizes engaging the comic form of literacy. A similar approach also inspired Melanie Gagich to alter the curriculum of her first-year English course completely, aiming to redefine digital projects as rigorous academic assignments and teach her students necessary audience analysis skills. Such a design ultimately allowed students in Gagich's classroom to develop their creativity and confidence as writers.

In another approach, Douglas Eyman recommends a course in web authoring and design that provides undergraduates more practical instruction in the production and rhetorical understanding of digital texts; specifically, it provides opportunities for students to learn fundamentals of web writing and design conventions, rules, and procedures. Similarly, Collin Bjork argues that "integrating digital rhetoric with usability testing can help researchers cultivate a more complex understanding of how students, instructors, and interfaces interact in OWI [online writing instruction]".

Other scholars focus more on the relationship between digital rhetoric and social impact. Scholars Lori Beth De Hertogh (et al.) and Angela Haas have published materials discussing intersectionality and digital rhetoric, arguing that the two are inseparable and classes covering digital rhetoric must also explore intersectionality. Iowa State's Lauren Malone has also analyzed the relationship between identity and teaching digital rhetoric through research on online engagement of queer and transgender people of color. From this research, Malone created a series of steps for digital rhetoric instructors to take in order to foster inclusivity within their classrooms. In her work, scholar Melanie Kill has introduced digital rhetoric to college-aged students, arguing for the importance of editing Wikipedia and capitalizing on their privilege of education and access to materials. Similar to De Hertogh (et al.) and Haas, Kill believes an education in digital rhetoric serves all students, as it facilitates positive social change.

==== K–12 ====
Many educational systems are framed so that students actively participate in technological systems as designers of digital rhetoric, not passive users. There are three core goals students have identified for their coursework: building their own digital space, learning all aspects of digital rhetoric (including the theory, technology, and uses), and applying it in their own lives. The ecological system generated by the interactions of students with classmates, digital media, and other individuals is the basis of "interconnected" rhetorical processes and shared digital work.

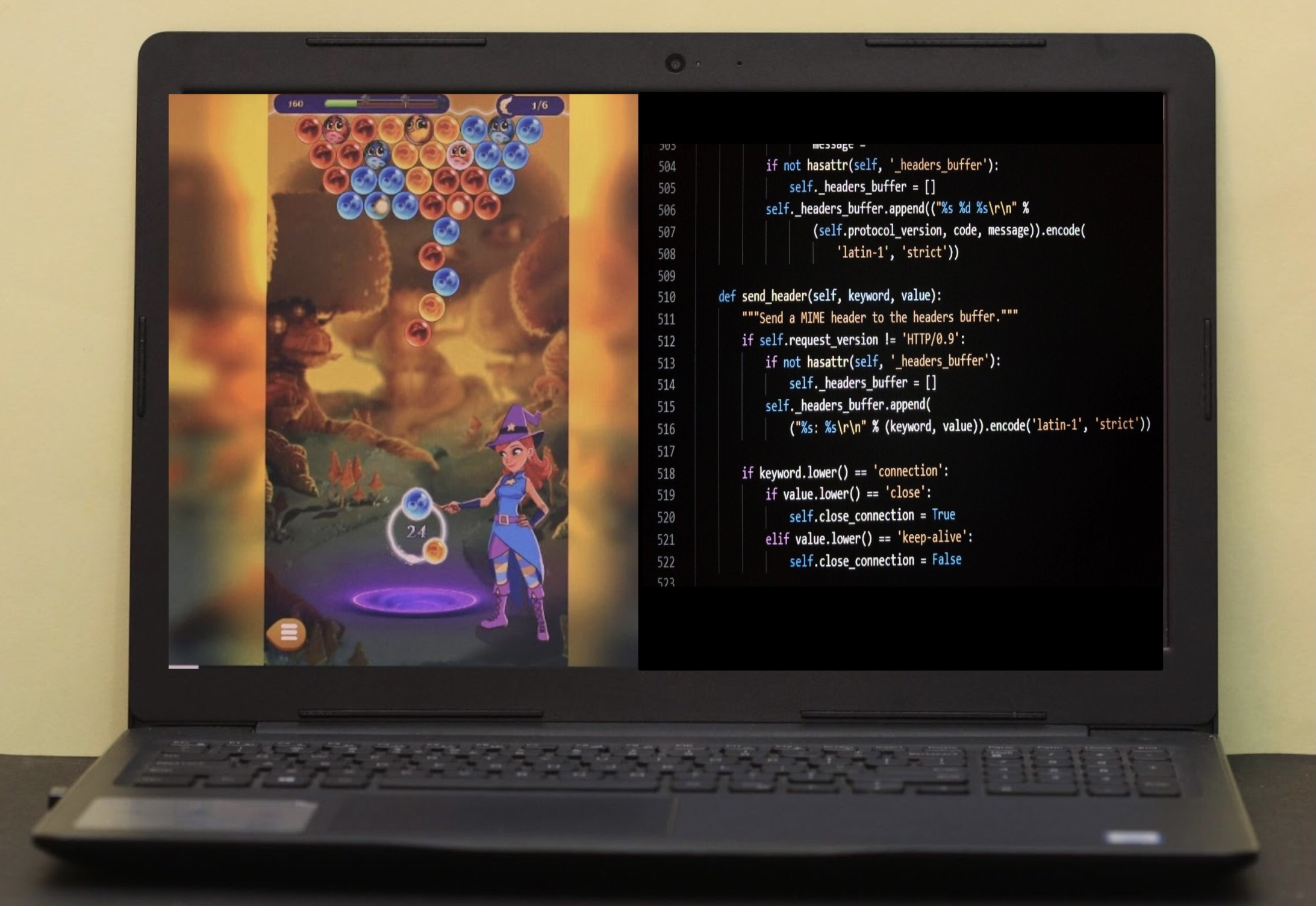
Code for a computer video game

Video games are one avenue through which students learn to design the rhetoric and code underlying their technological systems. Video game use has evolved rapidly since the 1980s, and current video games have been incorporated into education. Scholar Ian Bogost suggests that video games can be utilized in a multitude of subjects to serve as models for studying the non-digital world. Specifically, he notes that video games could be used as an "entry point" into computer science for students who may not have been interested in the field. Games and game technology enhance learning by operating at the "outer and growing edge of a player's competence". Games challenge students at levels that cause frustration but preserve motivation to solve the challenge at this edge.

Bogost also notes that video games can be taught as rhetorical and expressive in nature, allowing children to model their experiences through programming. When dissected, the ethics and rhetoric in video games' computational systems is exposed. Analysis of video games as an interactive medium reveals the underlying rhetoric through the performative activity of the player. Recognition of procedural rhetoric through course studies reflects how these mediums can augment politics, advertisement, and information. To help address the rhetoric in video game code, scholar Collin Bjork makes a series of recommendations for integrating digital rhetoric with usability testing in online writing instruction.

Some scholars have also identified specific practices for digital rhetoric instruction in pre-collegiate classrooms. As Douglas Eyman points out, students require agency when learning digital rhetoric, meaning instructors designing lessons must allow students to interact with the technology directly and enact change on the design. This is consistent with discoveries by other professors, who claim one of the primary goals of students in a digital rhetoric classroom is to create space for themselves, connections with peers, and deeply understand its significance. These interpersonal connections reflect a "thick correlation between digitalization and empowering pedagogy".

==== Pre-K ====
The United States Government's Office of Educational Technology has emphasized four guiding principles when using technology with early learners:

1. When used appropriately, technology can be a tool for learning.
2. The use of technology should allow for increased access to learning opportunities for all children.
3. Technology can be used to strengthen relationships between children and their families, early educators, and friends.
4. Technology is most effective when early learners are interacting with adults and peers. Adults can also supervise children online for said effectiveness.

Despite these four pillars, most studies conclude that learning technology for children under the age of two is not beneficial. At most, technology can be used to promote relationship development for these children; for instance, by using video chat software to connect with loved ones at a distance.

=== Digital rhetoric as a field of study ===
In 2009, rhetorician Elizabeth Losh offered this four-part definition of digital rhetoric in her book Virtualpolitik:

1. The conventions of new digital genres that are used for everyday discourse, as well as for special occasions, in average people's lives.
2. Public rhetoric, often in the form of political messages from government institutions, that is represented or recorded through digital technology and disseminated via electronically distributed networks.
3. The emerging scholarly discipline concerned with the rhetorical interpretation of computer-generated media as objects of study.
4. Mathematical theories of communication from the field of information science, many of which attempt to quantify the amount of uncertainty in a given linguistic exchange or the likely paths through which messages travel.

Losh's definition demonstrates that digital rhetoric is a field that relies on different methods to study various types of information, such as code, text, visuals, videos, and so on.

Douglas Eyman suggests that classical theories can be mapped onto digital media but a larger academic focus should be placed on the "extension of rhetorical theory". Careers in developing and analyzing the rhetoric in code form a prominent field of study. Computers and Composition, a journal established in 1985, focuses on computer communication and has considered the use of "rhetoric as their conceptual framework" and the digital rhetoric in software development.

Studies on how digital rhetoric implicates various topics are ongoing and encompass many fields. In his book, Digital Griots: African American Rhetoric in a Multimedia Age, Adam J. Banks states that modern day storytellers, like stand-up comics and spoken word poets, give African American rhetoric a flexible approach that is still true to tradition. While digital rhetoric can be used to facilitate traditions, select cultures face several practical application issues. Radhika Gajjala, professor at Bowling Green State University, writes that South Asian cyber feminists face issues with regard to building their web presence.

==== Research ethics ====
Writing and rhetoric scholars Heidi McKee and James E. Porter discuss the complicated issue of Internet users posting information publicly on the Internet but expecting the post to be semi-private. This appears contradictory, but socially the Internet is composed of millions of social identities, social groups, social norms, and social influence. These social aspects of the Internet are important to consider when studying digital topics because the digital and non-digital are getting harder to distinguish from one another.

A study conducted by Rösner and Krämer in 2016 showed that participants' identities would reflect the norms of these online social groups. Similar to how social groups are seen in an in-person setting, posts on forums, comment sections, and social media are like having a conversation with friends in a public setting. Typically, researchers would not use a conversation heard in public, but an online conversation is not only available to its social group. James Zappen, in his article "Digital Rhetoric: Toward an Integrated Theory", adds that many of these groups foster a creative and collaborative nature to share information to the public.

McKee and Porter suggest the use of a casuistic heuristic approach to doing digital research. This method of study is based on focusing on the moral principle of 'do no harm' to the audience and generating needed formulas or diagrams to help guide the researcher when gathering data. It is noted that this method does not provide all the answers. Instead, it is a starting point for the scholar to approach the digital world. More scholars have added their own take to an ethical approach for digital data. Many have a case-based approach with add-on consent from participants (if possible), anonymity to participants, and consideration of what harm could come to the groups being studied.

Eyman gives background information on ancient rhetoric going all the way back to Aristotle. including illustrations of both conventional and modern rhetoric. Beginning with ancient Greece and the medieval eras, there is a shift to more modern methods and instances. He explains three expression modes: Ethos, Logos, and Pathos. The term "digital" also refers to the physical production of texts, whether they are produced in print or electronically. In rhetorical studies, text can be seen as the medium for persuasive discourse or arguments; however, this tradition is primarily associated with printed texts, with less regard to 'Electric rhetoric', 'computational rhetoric', and 'technorhetoric'.

Eyman explores how traditional concepts, in rhetoric such as Ethos, Logos, and Pathos have been modernized to remain relevant today. He clarifies that these age-old methods of persuasion still hold significance but have evolved to be applied now. For instance, establishing credibility or Ethos is no longer solely dependent upon the speaker's character. It now encompasses elements of presence such, as maintaining a reputation, a substantial following, and producing valuable content. When creating points using logic (Logos) incorporating elements such, as charts or videos can aid in clarifying intricate concepts for the audience's comprehension level to increase significantly. To enhance connections (Pathos) integrating visuals along, with sound and video components can intensify the impact of messages by adding a personal and profound touch to them.

Eyman also mentions the shift, in dynamics brought about by platforms where persuasion becomes a process between speakers and audiences, unlike the traditional one-way communication in rhetoric. The ability of audiences to actively engage by commenting and sharing enables them to influence and steer conversations in spaces. It's a shift that illustrates how a simple post, on media has the potential to spark extensive discussions and interactions as it resonates with a wider audience. In today's paced communication landscape communicators need to be prepared for interactions and varied responses, from their audience impacting the effectiveness of their message.

Moreover, Eyman discusses the issues surrounding communication strategies. New digital technologies allow tailored messages to target audiences by imposing algorithms determining content visibility. This gives rise, to concerns relating to data privacy, and openness. For example, the use of algorithms to hand picked user content may slightly shape their viewpoints without their awareness. Eyman emphasizes the importance of handling this form of "persuasion" due to its significant impact on public viewpoint or belief.

Overall Eyman believes that digital communicators should be careful with these tools and use them ethically. He argues that rhetoric in the digital world isn't just about persuading; it's also about understanding the impact of these methods and respecting the audience's trust and privacy. This balanced approach encourages effective yet ethical communication.

=== Narrative Rhetoric ===
Digital storytelling is another development over that has grown with the advancement of technology. While most of these have appeared in the context of fictional works, nonfiction, rhetorical work have also taken on elements of narrative theory in a digital setting. Nonfiction "Interactive Digital Narratives" use strategies usually utilized in the service of fictional storytelling as way of conveying information or trying to convince others of a certain position or argument.

Practical examples of IDNs being applied to works of rhetoric include interactive documentaries, documentaries which the user engages with on some engages with on a level more than simply observing it, and serious games, video games made with goals of nonrecreational education and training. The interactive nature of these communications means that the rhetoric of the narrative is being constantly reshaped and reinterpreted, meaning that there are many digital narratives go on without any true ending.

=== Prolepsis ===
Prolepsis refers to the methods by which someone anticipates possible responses and arguments to a message. In digital communication, this exists in the form of social media proleptic cues, where one user issues a social media post makes a claim about the future or attempts to influence actions towards what the future should become. Other users who respond to these posts, in the form of comments or other validating/invalidating reactions, do so based on their own views on the predictions made. These responses serve as feedback for the original user, and as guiding tools for those responding to gauge and adapt to their own predictions.

The nature of these statements makes it so that there is a possibility that anyone can inspire conversation or calls to action over a certain topic, even if they are ill-informed on the subject. Instances such as these can often lead to the spread of misinformation and disinformation online. The misuse of prolepsis in a digital sphere often occurs through false citations of authority, appeals to cultural and societal fears, and the employment of slippery slope arguments.

== Social issues ==
=== Access ===
Referred to as the digital divide, issues of economic access and user-level access are recurring issues in digital rhetoric. These issues show up most prevalently at the intersection of computers and writing, though the digital divide impacts a multitude of online forums, user bases, and communities. A lack of access can refer to inequality in obtaining information, means of communication, and opportunities. For many that teach digital rhetoric in schools and universities, student access to technologies at home and in school is an operative concern. There is some debate about whether mobile devices like smartphones make technology access more equitable. In addition, the socioeconomic divide that is created due to accessibility is a major factor of digital rhetoric. For instance, Linda Darling-Hammond, an NIH researcher and professor of education at Stanford University, discusses the lack of educational resources that children of color in America face. Further, Angela M. Haas, author of "Wampum as Hypertext: An American Indian Intellectual Tradition of Multimedia Theory and Practice", describes access in a more theoretical way. Her text explains that through access one can connect a physical body with the digital space.

Another contributing factor is technology diffusion, which refers to how the market for new technology changes over time, and how that influences technology use and production across society. Studies conducted by scholar Sunil Wattal conclude that technology diffusion mimics social class status. As such, technology diffusion varies from community to community, making it a much greater challenge to ensure access equity across classes. Some researchers suggest that access affects multiple aspects of life and should be considered comprehensively. Some scholars argue that unresolved accessibility issues contribute to social disparities.

An example of a paywall from a news site

Another issue of access comes in the form of paywalls, which can be a major hindrance for education and reduce accessibility to many educational tools and materials. This practice can increase barriers to scholarship and limit open access information. Open access removes the barriers of access fees and the restrictions of copyright and licensing, allowing more equal access to works. Open access and digital rhetoric do not eliminate copyright, but they eliminate restrictions by giving authors the choice to maintain their right to copy and distribute their materials however they choose, or turn the rights over to a specific journal. Digital rhetoric involves works that are found online and open access is allowing more people to be able to reach these works.

=== Legitimacy ===
There is controversy regarding the innovative nature of digital rhetoric. Arguments opposed to legitimizing web text are Platonically based, in that they reject the new form of scholarship (web text) and praise the old form (print) in the same way that oral communication was originally favored over written communication. Originally some traditionalists did not regard online open access journals with the same legitimacy as print journals for this reason; however, digital arenas have become the primary place for disseminating academic information in many areas of scholarship. Modern scholars struggle to "claim academic legitimacy" in these new media forms, as the tendency of pedagogy is to write about a subject rather than actively work in it.

Within the past decade, more scholarly texts have been openly accessible, which provides an innovative way for students to gain access to textual materials online for free, such as scholarly journals like Kairos, Harlot of the Arts, and Enculturation.

=== Online harassment ===
Online harassment has been identified as a persistent issue, particularly on social media. Analysis linked cyberbullying-specific behaviors, including perpetration and victimization, to a number of detrimental psychosocial outcomes. Massey's research suggests a trend of people posting about their characters and lifestyles reinforces stereotypes (such as "hillbillies"), an outcome based on the fact that the rhetoric of difference is a naturalized component of the ethnic and racial identity. Erika Sparby theorized that anonymity and use pseudonyms or avatars on social media gives users more confidence to address someone or something negatively.

In 2005, these issues led to the launch of the first cyberbullying prevention campaign: STOMP Out Bullying. Like the abundance of campaigns that would form in the next fifteen years, it focuses on creating cyberbullying awareness and reducing and preventing bullying. The challenge of bullying within social media has increased following the rise of "cancel culture", which aims to end the career of a culprit through any means possible, mainly the boycott of their works.

More recently, techniques utilizing machine learning and artificial intelligence have become popular in synthesizing deepfakes: realistic but fake videos of people whose faces are swapped out with other people's faces. These kinds of videos can be created by easily obtainable and simple software, inciting concerns that people may use the software to blackmail or bully people online. A large quantity of images containing faces are required to create a deepfake. In addition, specific types of characteristics, such as different exposure and color levels, need to be consistent to make a realistic video. However, given the vast amounts of photos of people publicly available on the Internet from social media sites, there is concern about the extent to which people can use deepfakes as a bullying tactic. Reports indicate that deepfake technology has been used in instances of online harassment. One example involved a mother who used deepfake software to frame a few of her daughter's classmates at school by producing fake videos of them in pornographic videos. Due to machine learning and artificial intelligence being relatively new subfields of computer science and mathematics, there has not been enough time for deepfake video detection technologies to mature, and so far are only detectable using the human eye to spot irregularities in movement of the people in the videos.

=== Misinformation and disinformation ===
While digital rhetoric can often be used to persuade, in some cases it is used to spread false and inaccurate information. The proliferation of illegitimate information over the Internet has given rise to the term misinformation, which is defined as the spread of false claims that may or may not be intended to mislead others. This is not to be confused with disinformation, which is illegitimate or inaccurate information that is spread with the intent to mislead others. Both misinformation and disinformation have consequences towards the knowledge, perceptions, and, in some cases, actions of individuals. Social media specifically has greatly impacted the spread of false information. Scientific facts, such as the damaging environmental impacts of climate change, now come into question on a daily basis.

Social media has contributed to the proliferation of misinformation/disinformation because of its viral and largely unfiltered nature. Everyday users have the power to join and perpetuate a narrative that could be entirely false. In recent years, the term "fake news"—used synonymously with misinformation—has been highly popularized and politicized in digital spaces.

=== Politics ===
Digital rhetoric can now be found in politics, as it introduces a more direct relationship between politicians and citizens. Digital communication platforms and social networking sites allow citizens to share information and engage in debate with other people of similar or distinct political ideologies, which have been shown to influence and predict the political behavior of individuals outside the digital world. Some politicians have used digital rhetoric as a persuasive tool to communicate information to citizens. Some research suggests that digital rhetoric has contributed to increased political participation among citizens. Himelboim et al. journal on online political communication details numerous studies that demonstrate that there is a positive increase in political tolerance and knowledge due to online political communication with different people with different perspectives.

Theoretical research on digital rhetoric in politics has attributed the increase of political participation to three models: the motivation model, the learning model, and the attitude model.

- The motivation model proposes that digital rhetoric has decreased the opportunity costs of participating in politics since it makes information readily available to the people.
- The learning model suggests that political participation has increased due to the availability of online political information, which may contribute to greater citizen involvement in the political process.
- The attitude model extended from the previous two by suggesting that digital rhetoric has changed the perception of citizens towards politics, particularly by providing interactive tools that allow people to engage in the political process.

=== COVID-19 pandemic ===
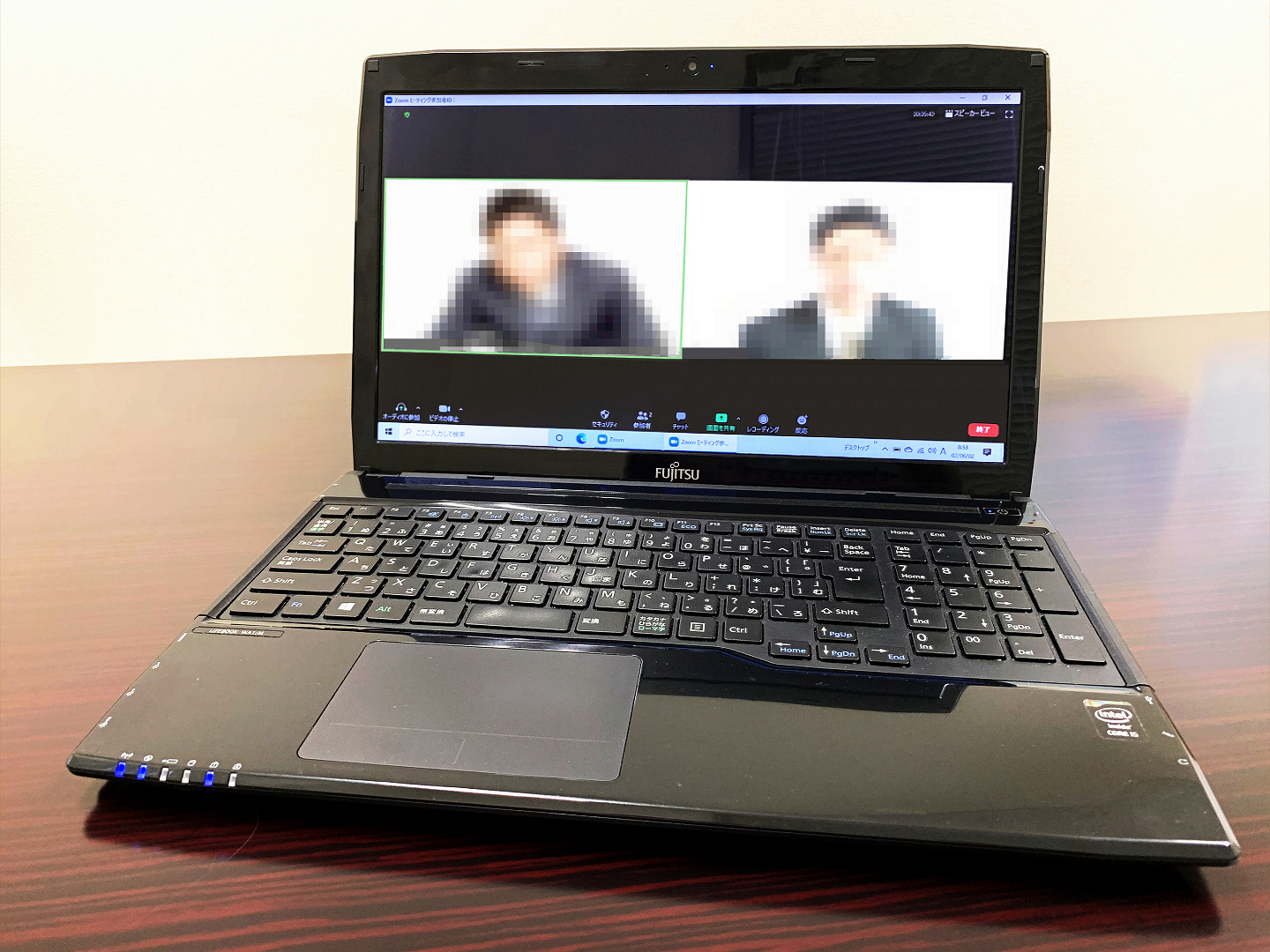
When shifting to online learning, many schools used video conference applications to continue teaching lessons

The persistence of the global COVID-19 pandemic has changed both physical and digital spaces. The resulting isolation and economic shutdowns complicated existing issues and created a new set of globalized challenges as it "imposed" a change to the "psychosocial environment". The pandemic has forced the majority of individuals with Internet access to depend on technology in order to remain connected to the outside world, and on a larger scale, global economies have become reliant on transitioning business to digital platforms.

Additionally, the pandemic forced schools across the globe to switch to an 'online only' approach. By March 25, 2020, all school systems in the United States closed indefinitely. In search of a platform to host online learning, many schools incorporated popular video chat service Zoom as their method of providing socially distant instruction. In April 2020, Zoom was hosting over 300 million daily meetings, as opposed to 10 million in December 2019. The shift to online learning demonstrated the current state of accessibility to digital information while promoting the use of digital learning through Zoom meetings, YouTube videos, and broadcasting systems such as Open Broadcaster Software. Still, it is questioned whether or not the switch to online learning has had detrimental impacts on students. In particular, it has been difficult to transition younger students to completely online models of learning, who often miss the social aspects of a school setting.

The pandemic has also contributed to creating misleading rhetoric in online spaces. Heightened public health concerns combined with the accessibility of social media led to the rapid spread of both misinformation and disinformation regarding COVID-19. Some people online theorized that the deadly virus could be cured by the ingestion of bleach, while others believed the disease to have been intentionally started by China in an attempt to take over the world. In response, many social media sites strengthened their policies relating to false information, but many misleading claims still find their way online.

== See also ==
- Composition studies
- Computer-mediated communication
- Digital media
- Hypermedia
- Internet studies
- Media studies
- Technological convergence
- Feminist technoscience
