= Digital Archive of Literacy Narratives =

Online public archive

The Digital Archive of Literacy Narratives (DALN) is an online public archive of personal literacy narratives. The DALN collects narratives ranging in formats and composition styles to include traditional and unconventional self-exploratory mediums such as video essays, drawings and written narratives. In 2005, Cynthia Selfe, H. Lewis Ulman, and Scott DeWitt at Ohio State University began development of the DALN with the purpose of creating and preserving a diverse and accessible collection of personal narratives. Literacy narratives are personal accounts of the development of ones reading or writing. Literacy narratives come in many formats including drawings, written narratives, and video accounts. Scholars have described literacy narratives as a teaching method used to teach reflection and awareness in writing classes. While most visitors to the site are from the United States, the DALN has developed a worldwide audience, and as of 2021, there were over 8,000 submissions from countries on six of seven continents.

== Origin ==
The original thought behind DALN was to provide opportunities to learn about historical and current writing practices through the experiences of individuals. There are submissions to the DALN from all different levels of learning giving people a place to expand their knowledge on the subject they are interested in. With origins in writing studies research, its creators sought to capture the development of narratives, to challenge notable definitions of literacy, and create a dynamic way for collaborators, readers and researchers to interact.Because the DALN is publicly accessible, scholars have examined how it's publicity has shaped the archive. In recent years DALN has been implemented in writing studies courses, with the intent of promoting literacy through personal inquiry.

== Implementation in writing courses ==
The DALN has been implemented in undergraduate writing courses as a tool to improve writing, research, and analytical skills. The DALN allows students to engage with topics that they care about and connect personal narrative stories with academic discourses. By implementing the DALN students acquire digital literacy skills that are often ignored in basic writing courses. The DALN improves accessibility to students as many of the narrative stories on it are in video or audio form which can help students who struggle to read and analyze written English. Students can look at narratives for free from a diverse set of people and realize their own narrative contributions have value in academic discourse. The literacy ability of students whose primary language is not English can get ignored in traditional writing classes because they may better express their ideas in another language or form. The DALN can allow them to share their complex ideas and narrative stories more accurately.

Many writing instructors such as Mary O'Connor and Kara Poe Alexander have implemented the DALN into assignments in their courses. O'Connor uses the DALN as an assignment in her college English class. The students first look for narratives on the DALN that interest them or that they can relate to. They then go on to write their own literacy narrative and compose a video version of it. Alexander requires her students in her college literacy course to upload their literacy stories to the DALN. Alexander claims that students contributing to the DALN is important because it gives students the opportunity to participate in public discourse and analyze literacy artifacts.

== See also ==
- Composition studies
