= Procedural rhetoric =

Game design concept

Procedural rhetoric or simulation rhetoric is a rhetorical concept that explains how people learn through the authorship of rules and processes. The theory argues that games can make strong claims about how the world works—not simply through words or visuals but through the processes they embody and models they construct. The term was first coined by Ian Bogost in his 2007 book, Persuasive Games: The Expressive Power of Videogames.

Bogost argues that games make strong claims about how the world works by the processes they embody. Procedural rhetoric analyzes the art of persuasion by rule based representations and interactions rather than spoken or written word. Procedural rhetoric focuses on how game makers craft laws and rules within a game to convey a particular ideology.

== A new rhetorical theory ==
The term "procedural rhetoric" was developed by Ian Bogost in his book Persuasive Games: The Expressive Power of Videogames. Bogost defines procedural rhetoric as "the art of persuasion through rule-based representations and interactions, rather than the spoken word, writing, images, or moving pictures" and "the art of using processes persuasively." Though Gonzalo Frasca's preferred term of "simulation rhetoric" uses different language, the concept is the same: he envisions the authors of games as crafting laws and that these authors convey ideology "by adding or leaving out manipulation rules." Frasca defines simulations as "to model a (source) system through a different system which maintains (for somebody) some of the behaviors of the original system," a definition that shows the importance of systemic procedures.

In coining this term, Bogost borrows Janet Murray's definition of procedural from her book Hamlet on the Holodeck—"a defining ability to execute a series of rules"—to theorize that a different system of learning and persuasion could be found in computerized media. As Bogost suggests, "This ability to execute computationally a series of rules fundamentally separates computers from other media." Frasca likewise sees the need for new rhetorical theory because "simulations can express messages in ways that narrative simply cannot." In procedural rhetoric, these rules of behavior then create "possibility spaces, which can be explored through play."

Procedural rhetoric also views games as strongly rhetorical—we "read games as deliberate expressions of particular perspectives." The exploration of possibility spaces becomes rhetorical and instructive as soon as games make claims about aspects of human experience, whether they do so intentionally or inadvertently. Frasca concurs that "video games are capable of conveying the ideas and feelings of an author" and "offer distinct rhetorical possibilities." Game laws represent "the designer's agenda." As Bogost traces the history of rhetoric back to classical Greece, he argues that, as theories of rhetoric have expanded from examining only verbal to including written and visual media, an expansion of rhetoric is now necessary to include the properties of procedural expression: "A theory of procedural rhetoric is needed to make commensurate judgments about the software systems we encounter everyday and to allow a more sophisticated procedural authorship with both persuasion and expression as its goal ... Procedural rhetoric affords a new and promising way to make claims about how things work." As Matt King summarizes the procedural and rhetorical sides of this theory, "By embodying certain processes and not others, by structuring a playing experience around particular rules and logics, videogames make claims about the world and how it works–or how it does not work, or how it should work."

Bogost overwhelmingly uses video games as the medium to clarify this concept because "they embody processes and rely upon players to enact them." However, he does suggest that this theory could apply to other types of "play" and their possibility spaces: "For example, consider a game of hide-and-seek in which an older player must count for a longer time to allow younger players a better chance to hide more cleverly. This rule is not merely instrumental; it suggests a value of equity in the game and its players." Similarly, procedural rhetoric would apply to board games such as Elizabeth Magie's The Landlord Game, a forerunner of Monopoly, that was designed to educate players on the negative outcomes of capitalism. Frasca is much more explicit about the historical use of procedural rhetoric: "Simulation is not a new tool. It has always been present through such common things as toys and games but also through scientific models or cybertexts like the I-Ching."

== Procedural vs. simulation rhetoric ==
Although Bogost and Frasca use different terms, their descriptions of this new type of rhetoric should be considered synonymous. Bogost sees procedural rhetoric in contrast to theories of verbal, written, and visual rhetoric, while Frasca coins the term "simulation rhetoric" to compare with narrative and drama as a form of representational storytelling. As he explains, "It is common to contrast narrative and drama because the former is the form of the past, of what cannot be changed, while the latter unfolds in present time. To take the analogy further, simulation is the form of the future. It does not deal with what happened or is happening, but with what may happen. Unlike narrative and drama, its essence lies on a basic assumption: change is possible." The ways in which they discuss their concepts are nevertheless almost identical.

== Further concepts ==
Expanding from the fundamental concepts of procedural rhetoric, where the core concepts deal with rhetoric as means of learning through rules and processes, there are extensions of other theories that contribute to the functionality of procedural rhetoric. In her article "Game-based Pedagogy in the Writing Classroom," Rebekah Schultz Colby outlines how "games" can essentially be beneficial towards improving an individual's skill due to the nature of multimodal interaction, or better defined as multimodal systems in the article. Though Schultz only focuses on core principles of games and the effect of game instructions, this approach relates to Ian Bogost's theory on how a pedagogical rule-based system can effect the outcome of a person's performance. Moreover, between the similarities of Bogost and Schultz's theories, it can be noted that there is a correlation between the rule based system, and the improvements of a person's skills.

== The rhetoric of gaming ==
Rhetoric is the art of discourse wherein a writer or speaker strives to inform, persuade or motivate particular audiences in specific situations. Procedural rhetoric focuses on the composition of gameplay, more specifically how simulation games are constructed to make claims about how the world should work.

James Gee, Professor at the University of Wisconsin – Madison, outlined the importance of video games for learning in his essay "Why Video Games are Good For Learning". Gee describes commercial games as "worlds in which variables interact through time." Game-makers compose video games with a series of predetermined rules and processes that the player must follow in order to win. The player must learn the rules of the virtual world and deduce what is possible and impossible in order to solve problems and carry out the ultimate goal of winning. The requirement of learning the rules of video games is the baseline of the procedural rhetoric theory.

Researchers Jens Seiffert and Howard Nothhaft found that computer games are powerful persuasive tools that act as a manipulating force for society. The researchers cited a 2009 study finding that military computer games transferred to the players understanding of warfare. In particular, the logic of the game revealed by the procedural and structural rules guided players with a deeper comprehension of the rules of warfare and tactics in real life.

Through the processes and rules of a simulation, game-makers have the ability to persuade players to view the world according to the procedures of a particular game. While contemporary rhetoric focuses on discourse as the art of persuasion, procedural rhetoric focuses on the gaming system, processes, rules, and procedures as a means to persuade the audience, that being players.

== In other settings ==
Elements of procedural rhetoric can also be found outside of video games. For example, Bogost references bureaucratic processes that involve computers, such as banking. In banking, the actions available to account holders are limited and directed by the procedures built into the banking system such as interest, fees, credit, and money transfers. These factors incentivise account holders to take a variety of specific actions, such as spending to improve credit, saving to accrue interest, and more.

Alec Slade Baker of San Diego State University argues that procedural rhetoric be used to study capitalist systems as well. In his masters dissertation, Civilization and Its Contents: Procedural Rhetoric, Nationalism, and Civilization V, he examines the rhetorical arguments created by customer service return policies at a variety of commercial businesses. According to him, Nordstrom's forgiving return policies communicate to customers a willingness to help and accommodate. On the other hand, strict return policies such as that of Dollar Tree reflect a hostile distrust of the customer that impacts the way they interact with those businesses.

Lucille A. Jewel of the University of Tennessee College of Law theorizes uses for procedural rhetoric in the courtroom setting in her scholarly article The Bramble Bush of Forking Paths: Digital Narrative. According to her, games or other interactive media could be used in the future to help explain complex legal concepts to juries, taking over the role that videos or other supplemental media now hold. This is because interactive media that uses procedural rhetoric can better illustrate the complexities of law on a case-by-case basis than static media.

== Critical discourse ==
Along with the development of procedural rhetoric in the greater digital rhetoric discourse, several counter-arguments critiquing the theory have been made as well. For example, Mike Treanor and Michael Mateas of the University of California, Santa Cruz, critiqued the concept of procedural rhetoric in their conference paper Newsgames: Procedural Rhetoric meets Political Cartoons, claiming that the concept gave too much credit to game creators who often didn't take the rhetoric supported by their systems into account during game design. For example, the 2004 flash game Madrid, by Gonzalo Frasca, created as a procedural rhetoric device discussing the 2004 Madrid train bombings, features a gameplay system that promotes frenetic, consistent, stressful action which is in direct opposition to the goal of creating empathy between the players and the people who were harmed.

Another major critique of procedural rhetoric is expressed by Miguel Sicart of the IT University of Copenhagen in his journal article Against Procedurality. Sicart disagrees with procedural rhetoric because of how it focuses completely on the creator's engineered experiences and systems, while ignoring the ability of the player to interact and change procedural systems in unforeseen ways. Specifically, he claims that the unique interests and goals of each player have the power to radically change the play experience, regardless of the author's intent.

== Examples ==
Bogost describes three prominent categories through which procedural rhetoric manifests itself in video games: politics, advertising, and education. Frasca also suggests examples of rhetoric in each of these categories.

=== Politics ===
Although perhaps not overwhelmingly common, a number of games have made political arguments. Bogost shows the potential effect of procedural rhetoric on political values through The Howard Dean for Iowa Game. He discusses how this game represents the "procedural rhetoric of politics," claiming that "one amasses supporters in support of nothing more than support." Bogost also sees political content in the government-funded first-person shooter America's Army, arguing that the game "serves as a convincing procedural rhetoric for the chain of command, the principle structure new recruits must understand immediately." America's Army therefore privileges government values and authority, suggesting to players that they should uncritically accept the missions they are provided. Frasca cites a 2002 CBS report that Minnesota governor Jesse Ventura considered using video games for propaganda and mentions the wave of anti-Osama video games that erupted online after September 11, 2001.

=== Advertising ===
Rhetoric focuses on persuasion, so it is no surprise that advertising would be present in some examples of procedural rhetoric. Bogost describes a possible effect of advertising procedural rhetoric in the game Animal Crossing. Although the game is targeted to children, there are certain rare things in the game that can only be found during the late hours of the night, meaning that the child would have to ask permission to acquire this rare item or enlist the help of parent(s) to acquire it. Bogost argues that this could be incentivized by the parents—for example, "do your chores and I will let you stay up to get it"—which shows the persuasive effect video games could have on both the parent and the child. Frasca sees advertising as especially prevalent in procedural rhetoric, arguing that advertisers "see in games a tool for persuasion" and noting the prevalence of product-based "advergames". Advergames make it especially clear that games in general contain ideological content because players understand that advergames have an explicit agenda.

=== Education ===
Education and instruction is an inherent theme of procedural rhetoric; players learn from seeing their behaviors rewarded or punished. Bogost uses the SeaWorld Adventure Parks Tycoon game (one of a number of simulation games about managing business franchises) as an example of the educational value of procedural rhetoric. In these games the player is tasked with creating a theme park, zoo, or other business and making it profitable. Although such games allow players to develop their businesses as they see fit, they ultimately require a successful business to progress and keep playing. This feedback process forces the player to learn how to manage a business and grow in knowledge as they play. Frasca mentions the simulation games SimCity and The Sims as examples of procedural rhetoric and uses the handling of same-sex relationships as an example: "[T]he way that The Sims's designers dealt with gay couples was not just through representation (for example, by allowing players to put gay banners on their yards), they also decided to build a rule about it. In this game, same-gender relationships are possible. ... By incorporating this rule, the designers are showing tolerance towards this sexual option."

== See also ==
- Explorable explanations
- Cybertext
- Digital media
- Digital rhetoric
- Simulated reality
- Video game theory
