= Computers and writing =

Study of digital writing

Computers and writing is a sub-field of college English studies about how computers and digital technologies affect literacy and the writing process. The range of inquiry in this field is broad including discussions on ethics when using computers in writing programs, how discourse can be produced through technologies, software development, and computer-aided literacy instruction. Some topics include hypertext theory, visual rhetoric, multimedia authoring, distance learning, digital rhetoric, usability studies, the patterns of online communities, how various media change reading and writing practices, textual conventions, and genres. Other topics examine social or critical issues in computer technology and literacy, such as the issues of the "digital divide", equitable access to computer-writing resources, and critical technological literacies. Many studies by scientists have shown that writing on a computer is better than writing in a book

"Computers and Writing" is also the name of an academic conference (see § Conference and Conference History below).

== The Field ==
This interdisciplinary field has grown out of rhetoric and composition studies. Members do scholarly work and teach in allied and diverse areas such as technical and professional communication, linguistics, sociology, and law. Important journals supporting this field are Computers & Composition, Computers & Composition Online, and Kairos: A Journal of Rhetoric, Technology, and Pedagogy. The professional organization Conference on College Composition and Communication has a committee, known as the 7Cs committee (CCCC Committee on Computers in Composition and Communication), that selects onsite and online hosts for the Computers & Writing conference and coordinates the "Technology Innovator Award" presented at that annual conference.

== Conference and Conference History ==
The conference "Computers and Writing" was established in 1982 in Minneapolis, Minnesota by Donald Ross and Lillian Bridwell. The conference was informal at first, but has grown from a grassroots organized conference to an established, mainstream conference that examines the ways in which computers change writing practice and pedagogy. In earlier conferences, the scholarship presented often explored how computers influenced individual writers, but during the late 1980s and 1990s, scholarship shifted to hypertext and hypermedia, and the social nature of computer mediated writing. The conference initially presented original or "homemade" software design associated with word processing and editing, but eventually switched to commercial software as commercial software became more common for both individual students and educational institutions.

The conference has a history of technological optimism, and the scholarship presented is optimistic regarding technology's influence on writing. The conference also examines and voices fears and concerns related to computer technology. Some of these fears are related to institutional policies and control as well as the fear of being overwhelmed by the constant march of technological innovation. The conference has also explored how computer-mediated writing can be used in socially responsible ways, as is evident by the feminist roots of the conference and subfield. The conference's feminist roots are evident in its support of minority scholars and scholarship. Awards such as the Hawisher and Selfe Caring for the Future Scholarship provide opportunities for new presenters in Computers and Writing related fields to attend the conference. This scholarship is preferably awarded to minority scholars who are involved in the field.

While the conference was originally more focused on software and hardware decisions and use, the conference has become more concerned with the theoretical application of computers in writing pedagogy and practice. This attention to theory mirrors a shift to embrace multimodal compositions as texts and interdisciplinary growth as the conference became more mainstream and established in the 1990s and early 2000s.

The conference has been held annually since 1988, which is the year that the CCCC Committee on Computers established a subcommittee to support the Computers and Writing Conference. While the journal Computers and Composition, founded by Cynthia Selfe and Kate Kiefer in 1983, is not officially connected to the Computers and Writing Conference, both began around the same time and explore the subfield within the larger fields of composition studies and rhetoric.

== Conferences dates and places ==
1983 University of Minnesota

1984 University of Minnesota

1985 University of California, Los Angeles

1986 University of Pittsburgh, Pennsylvania

1989 University of Minnesota

1990 University of Texas

1991 University of Southern Mississippi

1992 Indiana University Purdue University Indianapolis

1993 University of Michigan

1994 University of Missouri, Columbia

1995 University of Texas, El Paso

1996 Utah State University

1997 Kapi'olani Community College, Hawaiʻi

1998 University of Florida

1999 South Dakota School of Mines and Technology

2000 Texas Women's University

2001 Ball State University, Indiana

2002 Illinois State University

2003 Purdue University, Indiana

2004 University of Hawaiʻi and Kapi'olani Community College

2005 Stanford University, California

2006 Texas Tech University

2007 Wayne State University, Michigan

2008 University of Georgia

2009 University of California, Davis

2010 Purdue University, Indiana

2011 University of Michigan

2012 North Carolina State University

2013 Frostburg State University, Maryland

2014 Washington State University

2015 University of Wisconsin, Stout

2016 St. John Fisher College, New York

2017 University of Findlay, Ohio

2018 George Mason University, Virginia

2019 Michigan State University

2022 East Carolina University, North Carolina

2023 University of California, Davis

2024 Texas Christian University

2025 University of Georgia

Computers and Writing Conference 2025 was held at the University of Georgia. The theme of was "agency & authorship.” The keynote speakers were Jennifer Sano-Franchini and Jason Tham.

== Computers and Writing Conference 2022 ==
Computers and Writing Conference "Practicing Digital Activisms" was held in East Carolina University, Greenville, NC in May 19-22, 2022. The hashtag for the conference was #CWCon22.

Keynote Address:

Charlton Mcllwain, author of the book Black Software: The Internet & Racial Justice, From the Afronet to Black lives Matter.

Emerging Voices:

Antonio Byrd, an assistant professor of English at the University of Missouri-Kansas City;

Wilfredo Flores, a PhD Candidate in the Department of Writing, Rhetoric, and American Cultures at Michigan State University and a co-founder of Queering Medicine;

Constance Haywood, a fourth-year PhD candidate at Michigan State University;

Jo Hsu, an assistant professor of Rhetoric and Writing at the University of Texas at Austin;

Cana Itchuaqiyaq, tribal member of the Noorvik Native Community in NW Alaska and an assistant professor of professional and technical writing at Virginia Tech;

McKinley Green, an assistant professor of English at George Mason University.

Presenters:

== Pedagogy ==
Computers and writing pedagogy teach students practical applications and implications of writing by exploring complex concepts such as visual rhetoric, issues of access, and the social implications of online writing. Scholars analyze how the computer becomes an environment for facilitated writing and communication. The production and consumption of digital, multimodal, and new media texts advances the field's range of study and research. The integration of computers into writing instruction has significantly improved student's quality of writing by allowing for immediate feedback and periodic revision, resulting in enhanced writing capabilities. The majority of computers and writing scholars agree that engaging students in the production of such multimodal/digital texts is crucial to the learning process in our digitally infused moment. Technological advancements have facilitated the development of writing and digital literacy amongst students across all education levels. Consequently, theoretical frameworks designed for online writing instruction play a pivotal role in the advancement of pedagogy, encouraging the development of flexible learning environments.

During the 1960s and 1970s, which was also known as the "Birth of Composition," computer-assisted instruction was used to observe students and provided instant positive, negative, or constructive feedback. How computers and digital technologies would impact writers' efficiency and quality of work was being determined. Initial debate came from how best to balance creativity and technical construction in writing. Many teachers thought that the technology programs offered needed improvement because they did not allow for the creative expression of the students, acting only as an evaluator, reader, and feedback agent. Now the programs require multimodality, creativity, and technical complexity. The problems the students face in these programs now require much more comprehensive thinking and creativity to the point that it is difficult to still call the subject "writing" because the students are required to know much more.

Computers and writing pedagogies must be dynamic and adaptable to how technology, media, and the sociopolitical spaces operate in a constant state of flux. Emerging forms of pedagogies address "Digital Activism" and the use of social media on political communication and advocacy. Quality interaction in blended and online writing classes is important. It should emphasize pedagogical methods that foster thoughtful communication between instructors and students and facilitate the enhancement of writing skills.

Computers and digital media offer innovative ways to engage rhetorically with one another. Studying how students develop their digital literacy through their connecting their previous interactions with technologies to new forms by means of metaphors and mental models. Teaching theoretical composing concepts through scaffolding can build students' digital literacy both with current and future technologies and programs. These skills advance critical media awareness when working with digital media.

== Writing in the age of communication technology ==
In the age of communication technology, amateurs and experts collaborate to create, sustain and develop virtual communities based on what James Paul Gee and Elisabeth Hayes have called "passionate affinity spaces", or communities organized around "a shared endeavor, interest, or passion". Technology, specifically blogs, can be a way to build learning communities and help students learn to write authentically for and respond to various audiences by making their writing public. On the virtual playing field, knowledge and talent matter more than degrees and professional memberships, so these spaces offer students a new learning environment and space to collaborate on the production and distribution of knowledge. Online platforms can reshape traditional pedagogies by encouraging flexibility and personal creativity. Also, digital tools improve educational quality by promoting a collaborative environment that stimulates critical thinking, preparing students for the pedagogical shifts in writing education.

Aligning with the notion of "affinity space", composition scholars have coined the term "cultural ecology" to examine the complex social and cultural contexts that shape the development of technological literacy. Drawing from the literacy narratives of two participants, Hawisher, Selfe, Moraski, and Pearson theorized five themes emergent from the cultural ecology of literacy, namely the "cultural, material, educational, and familial contexts" that shape and are shaped by literacy development. The five themes of cultural ecology emphasize that technological literacy goes through life spans, that literacy provides the medium for people to exert their agency, that literacy occurs and develops both within and outside of school contexts, that the conditions of access influence people's literacy development, and that literacy practices and values transmit via family units. Kristine Blair pointed to the positive impacts of cultural conflicts in constructing online discourses and political discussions, while at the same time warning that students may not transform exposure to the conflicts. Also looming behind the issue of culture in computer and writing is the digital divide. Cynthia Selfe showed that unequal access to technological literacy is situated in unequal social, cultural, economic, and political situations. As Selfe wrote, "computers continue to be distributed along the related axes of race and socioeconomic status and this distribution continues to ongoing patterns of racism and to the continuation of poverty." To address the digital divide, Selfe called upon educators and compositionists to rethink computer literacy as a political act that requires paying critical attention to inequality issues and acting politically in specific disciplinary contexts.

== See also ==
- Conference on College Composition and Communication
- Digital rhetoric
- Multimodality
- Media theory of composition
- Composition studies
