= James L. Kinneavy =

American scholar of rhetoric (1920–1999)

James Louis Kinneavy (26 June 1920 – 10 August 1999) was an American scholar and teacher of rhetoric and composition. Since the publication of his best-known work, A Theory of Discourse, he has been widely considered "one of America's major rhetorical theorists." The book's main contribution to the field of contemporary discourse is the case Kinneavy made for the importance of rhetoric throughout Western history. He authored seven books and over thirty articles on rhetorical theory and composition pedagogy, and his work has been the "cornerstone of dozens of textbooks on composition, many university and college programs, and entire state language arts programs." Throughout his career, Kinneavy was heavily involved with teaching, working with the Texas Department of Education and as a consultant to school districts in Texas and other states.

== Biography ==
=== Early life and education ===
Kinneavy was born in Denver, Colorado, the son of James (a florist) and Teresa (Peila) Kinneavy. He was the oldest of five children, four sons and one daughter. When Kinneavy was eight, his mother died and his father placed the five children in St. Vincent's Orphanage. Kinneavy attended St. Catherine's parochial school from the age of 8 until he was 15 and then joined the Christian Brothers, a teaching order of the Catholic Church. The order sent him to be educated in seminaries in New Mexico and Louisiana, and he graduated from Sacred Heart Training College in Santa Fe, New Mexico, in 1942, having majored in English. After graduation, the order sent Kinneavy to teach math, sciences, languages, music, and English at elementary and secondary schools in New Mexico and Louisiana. In 1949, Kinneavy began graduate studies in English at Catholic University of America. He completed the M.A. degree with honors in 1951 and earned a Ph.D. in 1956. His dissertation, A Study of Three Contemporary Theories of Lyric Poetry, was published in 1956.

=== Career ===
Kinneavy was transferred in 1955 to teach at St. Michael's, a four-year men's college in Santa Fe, New Mexico. Here he chaired the English department, became dean of students, and taught courses in English, theology, and philosophy. After leaving the Christian Brothers order in 1957, Kinneavy served as Assistant Professor for five years at Western State College in Gunnison, Colorado. He joined the faculty at the University of Texas at Austin in 1963 and taught there for 33 years, serving as director of the writing program and holding the Blumberg Centennial Professorship in English. Kinneavy retired in 1996 after 55 years of classroom teaching. He died at the age of 79 following a brief illness.

== Legacy ==
Kinneavy "significantly changed the way composition was taught at colleges and high schools across the United States." His work, A Theory of Discourse, brought together classical and contemporary developments in rhetoric. St. Edwards University awarded him an honorary doctorate in humane letters in 1980 in recognition of his work to develop its writing curriculum. In 1995 Kinneavy received an Exemplar Award from the Conference on College Composition and Communications in recognition of his contributions to the field of rhetoric and composition. His contributions have been summarized as follows.

James Kinneavy's rereading of ancient rhetoric, particularly the Sophistic touchstone kairos, enriched instruction in written composition and, with the work of many others – Ross Winterowd, James Murphy, Winifred Bryan Horner – laid an intellectual groundwork for the interdisciplinary turn in composition that has been taken up by scholars in rhetoric and composition.

== Works ==
- A Study of Three Contemporary Theories of Lyric Poetry, Catholic University of America Press, 1956.
- A Theory of Discourse, Prentice-Hall, 1971. Reprinted, Norton, 1980.
- (With J.Q. Cope and J. W. Campbell) Aims and Audiences in Writing, Kendall-Hunt, 1976.
- (With Cope and Campbell) Writing: Basic Modes of Organization, Kendall-Hunt, 1976.
- (With William J. McCleary and Neil Nakadate) Writing in the Liberal Arts Tradition, Harper, 1985. 2nd ed., 1990.
- Greek Rhetorical Origins of Christian Faith: An Inquiry, Oxford University Press, 1987.
- (Editor with Fredric G. Gale and Phillip Sipiora) Ethical Issues in College Writing, Peter Lang, 1999.
