= Digital storytelling =

Process where ordinary people create and share stories using digital media

Digital storytelling is a short form of digital media production that enables individuals to create and distribute their narratives through online platforms. The method is frequently used in schools, museums, libraries, social work and health settings, and communities. They are thought to have educational, democratizing and therapeutic effects.

Digital storytelling is the practice of using digital media tools to tell stories, such as images, audio, videos, animation, and text to effectively tell a story. It focuses on emotional engagement, artistic endeavors, personal expression, and creativity. This combines narrative elements such as (characters, setting, plot, emotion). It represent creative freedom and emotional expression: Not bound to data and can include fiction, personal stories, cultural traditions, or advocacy messages.

Digital storytelling is a community-based activity and should be distinguished from electronic literature, which is a literary movement where genres include hypertext fiction, digital poetry, interactive fiction, generative literature, and from other forms of digital narrative, for instance in video games or fan fiction.

== Introduction ==
"Digital stories" are "short vignettes that combine storytelling with still pictures, video clips, music, and text using a variety of video software".

Digital stories often present in compelling and emotionally engaging formats, and can be interactive. The media used may include the digital equivalent of film techniques, stills, audio only, or any of the other forms of non-physical media (material that exists only as electronic files as opposed to actual paintings or photographs on paper, sounds stored on tape or disc, movies stored on film) which individuals can use to tell a story or present an idea.

The term "digital storytelling" is sometimes also used more broadly to cover a range of digital narratives (web-based stories, interactive stories, hypertexts, and narrative computer games); It is sometimes used to refer to film-making in general, and as of late, it has been used to describe advertising and promotion efforts by commercial and non-profit enterprises.

Digital storytelling is enable people to share personal experiences and creative narratives with digital media. This newer form of storytelling emerged with the advent of accessible media production techniques, hardware and software, including but not limited to digital cameras, digital voice recorders, iMovie, Microsoft Photos, Final Cut Express and WeVideo. These new technologies allow individuals to share their stories over the Internet on YouTube, Vimeo, compact discs, podcasts, and other electronic distribution systems.

Digital storytelling has been described as an extension of traditional storytelling which incorporates digitized still images, moving images and sounds. Digital technologies are also enable narratives to be presented from different perspectives. Many people use elaborate non-traditional story forms, such as non-linear and interactive narratives.

Simply put, digital stories are multimedia presentations that combine a variety of communicative elements within a narrative structure. Media may include any combination of the following: text, images, video, audio, social media elements (like tweets), or interactive elements (like maps).

Digital stories may be used as an expressive medium within the classroom to integrate subject matter with extant knowledge and skills from across the curriculum. Students can work individually or collaboratively to produce their own digital stories. These stories can be published on the internet, if desired.

== Development ==
Digital storytelling has been used by Ken Burns, in the documentary The Civil War, cited as one of the first models of this genre. In his documentary, Burns used first-person accounts that served to reveal the heart and emotions of this tragic event in American history, as well as narration, archival images, modern cinematography, and music (Sylvester & Greenidge, 2009).

The "short narrated films" definition of digital storytelling comes from a production workshop by Dana Atchley at the American Film Institute in 1993 that was used for training by the San Francisco Bay Area-based StoryCenter (formerly the Center for Digital Storytelling).

== Components ==
Digital stories can combine still images, moving images, sound, text and interactive features. Unlike traditional forms of storytelling, they may use nonlinear structures that allow audiences to interact with the content. These different forms of media provide creators with several ways to organise and present a narrative. Interactive features may also change how authors and audiences experience a story.

Digital stories can be created with computers, digital cameras, audio recorders, smartphones and editing software. They may include photographs, written text, audio, voice-over narration, hyperlinks and video. Finished stories can be shared through the internet, podcasts, discs and other electronic media. Programs such as iMovie, Microsoft Photos and WeVideo provide accessible tools for combining media and editing a digital story.

In educational settings, students can select from a range of technical tools when creating digital stories. The production process may involve learning new software, selecting images, editing video, recording voice-over narration, adding music, creating title screens and controlling the sequence and transitions. Digital stories may also include interactive features that allow readers to participate. For example, users may click on images or text to choose what happens next, activate an event or access related online content.

Additionally, distinctions may be drawn between Web 2.0 storytelling and that of digital storytelling. Web 2.0 storytelling is said to produce a network of connections via social networking, blogging, and YouTube that transcends beyond the traditional, singular flow of digital storytelling. It tends to "aggregate large amounts of microcontent and creatively select patterns out of an almost unfathomable volume of information," therefore the bounds of Web 2.0 storytelling are not necessarily clear.

Another form of digital storytelling is the micromovie, which is "a very short exposition lasting from a few seconds to no more than 5 minutes in length. It allows the teller to combine personal writing, photographic images or video footage, narrative, sound effects, and music. Many people, regardless of skill level, are able to tell their stories through image and sound and share those stories with others."

Telling a digital story combines a narrative, whether it be fiction or non fiction, personal or general, and digital media. Digital media includes imaging, video, sound and all other forms of media then can be portrayed visually, the most simple of digital stories can even be a power point. The point is to convey a message through imagery, which a lot of times can be more effective than if just conveyed through sound. Another outlet for digital storytelling can be articulated through some social media sites such as Facebook and Instagram, where one might be constantly posting images accompanied by captions in order to portray the story of one's life. "A story can be as short as explaining how one misplaced one's keys in the morning or as long as a multivolume autobiography." The wonderful thing about telling a digital story is that there really are no rules. However, there are certain guidelines that are tried and true over time that make up better stories. The most important rule is don't be boring, tell a good story and the "truth" of a "story" lies in a process not the content. Joe Lambert and others who work at Storycenter and other places around the world train people in how to improve their stories during digital storytelling workshops by writing out the story and discussing many options of connecting with the material before recording it in a digital format and editing it into video. When one wants to capture the attention of one's audience, it is important to be passionate about the themes and or characters when telling any story. In order to sell the story, regardless of the medium, the artist may need to ask oneself about what stories could be more compelling before relating the story to others. Some of the best stories begin with one's own personal insights in order to find an interesting and profound dramatic story. It also has more personal stories to tell.

== Uses in education ==
The StoryCenter (formerly the Center for Digital Storytelling) model has also been adopted in education, especially in the US, sometimes as a method of building engagement and multimedia literacy. For example, the Bay Area Video Coalition and Youthworx Media Melbourne, the UK social enterprise Noise Solution and the Belgian non-profit Maks vzw employ digital storytelling to engage and empower young people at risk.

=== Uses in primary and secondary education ===
"The idea of merging traditional storytelling with today's digital tools is spreading worldwide." Anybody today with a computer can create a digital story simply by answering such questions as "What do you think? What do you feel? What is important? How do we find meaning in our lives?" Most digital stories focus on a specific topic and contain a particular point of view. "These topics can range from personal tales to the recounting of historical events, from exploring life in one's own community to the search for life in other corners of the universe and every story in between."

For primary grades the focus is related to what is being taught, a story that will relate to the students. For primary grades the story is kept under five minutes to retain attention. Vibrant pictures, age-appropriate music and narration are needed. Narration accompanied by subtitles can also help build vocabulary. Content-related digital stories can help upper-elementary and middle-school students understand abstract or layered concepts. For example, in one 5th grade class a teacher used digital storytelling to depict the anatomy of the eye and describe its relationship to a camera. A fifth grader said, "This year I have learned that places are not just physical matter but emotional places in peoples' hearts. iMovie has made all my thoughts and feelings come alive in an awesome movie."

These aspects of digital storytelling, pictures, music, and narration reinforce ideas and appeal to different learning types. Teachers can use it to introduce projects, themes, or any content area, and can also let their students make their own digital stories and then share them. Teachers can create digital stories to help facilitate class discussions, as an anticipatory set for a new topic, or to help students gain a better understanding of more abstract concepts. These stories can become an integral part of any lesson in many subject areas. Students can also create their own digital stories and the benefits that they can receive from it can be quite plentiful. Through the creation of these stories students are required to take ownership of the material they are presenting. They have to analyze and synthesize information as well. All of this supports higher-level thinking. Students are able to give themselves a voice through expressing their own thoughts and ideas.

Digital Storytelling', can be used by a class to explore local community institutions as well. Government school students from Bengaluru district of Karnataka, India used digital storytelling to design narratives of their interactions with local institutions such as banks, primary health centres, libraries, shops, police stations, post offices etc. Through these interactions, students attempted to deepen their understanding of the work of these institutions, their vision and challenges and how the institution members responded to these challenges. The digital stories created by these students became curricular resources, specially in social sciences, for these schools as well.

When students are able to participate in the multiple steps of designing, creating and presenting their own digital stories, they can build several literacy skills. These include the following: Research skills by finding and analyzing information when documenting the story, writing skills when developing a script, and organization skills by managing the scope of the project within a time constraint. Learning about the use of technology is a skill that can be gained through learning to use a variety of tools, such as digital cameras and multimedia authoring software and presentation skills through the presentation of the story to an audience. Students also gain interview, interpersonal, problem-solving and assessment skills through completing their digital story and learning to receive and give constructive criticism.

Software such as iMovie or Microsoft Photos do all that is required.

Faculty and graduate students at the University of Houston have created a website, The Educational Uses of Digital Storytelling, which focuses on the use of digital storytelling by teachers and their students across multiple content areas and grade levels.

The National Writing Project has a collaboration with the Pearson Foundation examining the literacy practices, the values, attitudes, beliefs and feelings, associated with their digital storytelling work with students.

=== Use by teachers in curriculum ===
Teachers can incorporate digital storytelling into their instruction for several reasons. Two reasons include 1) to incorporate multimedia into their curriculum and 2) teachers can also introduce storytelling in combination with social networking in order to increase global participation, collaboration, and communication skills. Moreover, digital storytelling is a way to incorporate and teach the twenty-first century student the twenty-first century technology skills such as information literacy, visual literacy, global awareness, communication and technology literacy.

The educational goals for teachers using digital storytelling are to generate interest, attention and motivation for students of the "digital generation" in classrooms. The use of digital storytelling as a presentation tool also appeals to the diverse learning styles of students. Digital storytelling also capitalizes on students' creative talents and allows their work to be published on the Internet for others to view and critique.

A handful of teachers around the world have embraced digital storytelling from a mobile platform. The use of small handheld devices allows teachers and students to create short digital stories without the need for expensive editing software. iOS devices are the norm nowadays and mobile digital storytelling applications like The Fold Game have introduced an entirely new set of tools for the classroom.

=== Uses in higher education ===
Digital storytelling spread in higher education in the late nineties with StoryCenter (formerly the Center for Digital Storytelling) through collaborating with a number of universities while based at UC Berkeley. StoryCenter programs with the New Media Consortium led to partnerships with many campuses where programs in digital storytelling have grown; these include University of Maryland, Baltimore County; Cal State Monterey, Ohio State University, Williams College, MIT, and the University of Wisconsin, Madison. The University of Colorado, Denver, Kean University, Virginia Tech, Simmons College, Swarthmore College, the University of Calgary, University of Massachusetts (Amherst), the Maricopa County Community Colleges (AZ), and others have developed programs.. The University of Utah offered its first class on digital storytelling (Writing 3040) in the Fall of 2010. The program has grown from 10 students the first semester to over 30 in 2011, including 5 graduate students. Chicago journalist Mark Tatge started a Digital Storytelling program at DePauw University in 2011. Students learned journalistic-style storytelling techniques and published the resulting stories on a class website.

The distribution of digital storytelling among humanities faculty connected with the American Studies Crossroads Project was a further evolution through a combination of both personal and academic storytelling. Starting in 2001, Rina Benmayor (from California State University-Monterey Bay) hosted a StoryCenter (formerly the Center for Digital Storytelling) seminar and began using digital storytelling in her Latino/a life stories classes. Benmayor began sharing that work with faculty across the country involved in the Visible Knowledge Project including Georgetown University; LaGuardia Community College, CUNY; Millersville University; Vanderbilt University, and University of Wisconsin–Stout. Out of this work emerged publications in several key academic journals as well as the Digital Storytelling Multimedia Archive.

Ball State University has a masters program in digital storytelling based in the Telecommunications Department, as does the University of Oslo.

In 2011, the University of Mary Washington launched an open online course in digital storytelling titled DS106. The course includes credit-seeking students at the university as well as many open, online participants from around the world.

Digital storytelling is also used as an instructional strategy to not only build relationships and establish people's social presence online but also as an alternative format to present content.

Digital storytelling in higher education can also be used for scholarly communication. Digital storytelling in scholarly education provides a non-traditional tool that fosters a more experiential learning experience that encourages students to think critically about various academic topics. For example, higher education students at the graduate and undergraduate level create scholarly digital stories based on their academic research across disciplines, including American studies, anthropology, history, industrial design, and international studies.

=== Uses in public health, healthcare, social services, and international development ===
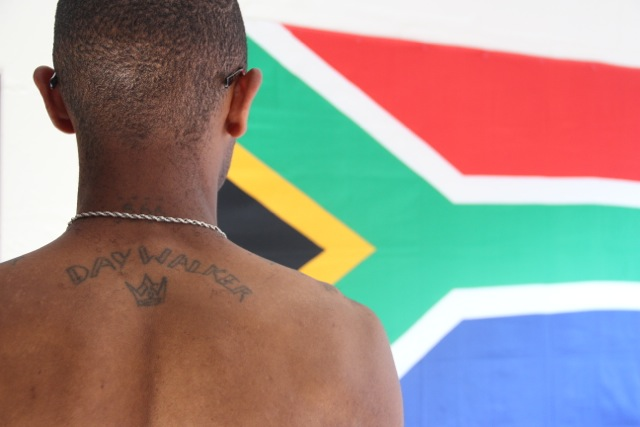
"Day Walker" was Welcome's nickname in the Sonke Gender Justice "One Man Can" campaign tackling HIV and gender-based violence.

The development of the Silence Speaks project in 1999 under the direction of Amy Hill (who joined the StoryCenter (formerly the Center for Digital Storytelling) in 2005) led to the expansion of digital storytelling in public health. Projects developed with the Centers for Disease Control, the Open Society Foundations, work in gender-based violence prevention with groups in California, Texas, New York, Minnesota, and with the organization Sonke Gender Justice in South Africa, the broad use of digital storytelling with Foster Youth, and finally the connection to digital storytelling to public campaigns in substance abuse prevention and community mental health programs.

Digital storytelling is being used to raise awareness of the "human" factors in healthcare.

The Patient Voices programme is the product of Pip Hardy and Tony Sumner. Established in 2003, their project provides a means for people (patients, families or healthcare workers) to tell their stories which might affect clinicians, managers and decision-makers in the healthcare arena. The Programme has worked closely with The Royal College of Nursing, The National Clinical Governance Support Team, The National Audit Office, NHS England, NHS Improving Quality, Imperial College Healthcare Trust, King's College London, University College London and many other NHS organisations and universities. Patient Voices projects have also taken place in Canada, Australia, Norway, Hong Kong and Tanzania and the stories are used in schools of medicine and healthcare throughout the world to prompt reflection and stimulate discussion and debate.

The Patient Voices programme also provides a freely accessible resource to anyone who desires to improve the quality of health and social care. All stories, once released, are available at The Patient Voices. The stories have contributed to an understanding of patients' experiences and their role in their illness as well as to a greater understanding of the experience of people who work in healthcare.

In addition, the process of creating a Patient Voices digital story has been used to enhance the reflective skills of newly qualified nurses and medical students.

=== Use In therapy ===
Digital Storytelling is also being used as therapy. Kim Anderson, who has a Ph.D. in licensed clinical social work has worked with Digital Storytelling with clients suffering from domestic violence, abuse, incest, and other traumatic psychological situations. Her work was used at the University of South California, the Zur Institute, and in numerous other publications including one in a chapter in a book on film/video-based therapy while teaching at the University of Central Florida.

=== Uses in museums ===
Digital storytelling is being used by many different museums.

The largest project, Culture Shock!, is currently taking place in the North East of England. This project is using museum and gallery collections to inspire people to create their own digital stories, which are also being added to the relevant museum collections.

Another large-scale project is the work of the Australian Centre for the Moving Image.

The National Gallery of Art in Washington D.C. also held a series of classes to integrate arts education curriculum with digital storytelling from 2003 to 2005.

Some museums help interpret and make community history accessible. In 2007, the Colorado Historical Society collaborated with StoryCenter (formerly the Center for Digital Storytelling) to create a program, The Italians, about Italian American History. In 2008, a group of eleven museums in Yorkshire launched My Yorkshire, a digital storytelling project. The museums work with communities to use contemporary collected oral histories alongside those from archives to interpret local history from a personal point of view, through the use of historical oral recordings and archival photos. The group has also produced help guides to creating digital stories in a museum setting.

Finished digital stories can have many uses: advertising an upcoming exhibition, preserving a short-term project, building relations with communities. They provide skills to volunteers and can be permanently displayed in galleries.

=== Uses for religious training ===
In 2005, the Church of Norway initiated a project wherein young people raised questions of faith and life in short biographical mini-films called 'Digital Faith Stories'. A study of this project in a congregation near Oslo found that the method of 'Digital Storytelling' could contribute to a more systematic educational method for including the lifeworld of the young in religious training.

== Uses in libraries ==
A digital story station is a public space for people to create a digital story that serves to archive oral histories from the public perspective. These oral stories may focus on a personal experience, incident, describing a place or witnessing an event. Based on the StoryCenter (formerly the Center for Digital Storytelling) model, over 30 public libraries ranging from Northern down the coast to Southern California have a place for people to tell their own story.

Bilingual library staff work with participants to create a recording using the digital station, which can be integrated with a variety of media, including audio, video, pictures, and images. The digital storytelling station project called California of the Past is funded by a grant from the California State Library, U.S. Institute of Museum and Library Services and Technology Act, and administered in California by librarians. The Media Arts Center in San Diego facilitates this project.

Since 2006, San Diego has housed a story station in its downtown library. The Media Arts Center of San Diego partnered with the downtown public library to set up a story station where the public can create a three-minute video. The topics of the archived videos range from personal to historical documentaries.

== Uses in business ==
With the development of marketing in the digital world is digital storytelling implemented in business. Digital storytelling is used as a tool of user-generated content, when consumers contribute their opinion based on their own experiences about a product to promote a firm's product in the digital world.

Digital storytelling is being used by innovative startups to pitch their ideas to the potential investors and to communicate with potential customers to get feedback about the market potential of their product or service.

The Enterprise Center with Salem State University organized a Big Idea Video Pitch Contest competition for students to submit a 60-second video pitch of a unique idea for a business, non-profit or social cause. People could vote once per day using the "vote now" button that is displayed in the voting section. The Digital Story that receives the most votes was awarded. Videos were judged on originality, creativity, and the clarity of message.

Project SomePitching is a crowdsourced online competition for new business ideas and early stage startups to provide feedback on their product and business ideas. The freeform explanation could be a website, a short pitching video or an animation (max. 90 seconds), a slide set (max. 5 pages with font size 20+), or any other material (or combination of materials) that was short and clear for anyone to evaluate.

SomePitching used the Innopinion platform to manage the idea rating process and the selection of winners based on the ratings from both the public and professional jury.

The intent of this competition wasn't to present the best Big Idea of the product, service, or solution only, but also to find the way, how to interpret it by Digital Story the best way from visual and narrative point of view. Because in the public jury phase, the evaluations was based on the following categories (with percent of the final score):

- Interest to buy or use the solution (20%)
- The importance of the problem the solution solves (20%)
- The value the solution brings (20%)
- The clarity and quality of the material (20%)

== Place-based digital storytelling ==
The Canadian Film Centre's New Media Lab (formerly MediaLinx Habitat) launched a project, Murmur, out of the 2002–2003 studio. The project integrates audio interviews into cellphone-based tours. StoryCenter (formerly the Center for Digital Storytelling) created Storymapping.org in 2006 with projects in Mendocino (California), Houston, New Orleans, and Tuscaloosa (Alabama) to promote the connection between storytelling and issues of local memory and civic planning.

The Voice Library (TVL) launched two, ongoing, social-giving projects in 2014. The Military Families Story Project, based out of Portsmouth, New Hampshire, maintains and strengthens families' ties, builds morale through a brother-/sisterhood network, enables service men and women and their families to record history as they make it, and memorializes veterans' experiences. TVL's national Let Me Be Your Memory project, in collaboration with Cognitive Dynamics, offers a unique, six-week audio-based archiving Language Arts curriculum for students and educational institutions that builds multiple, Common Core-adaptable competencies by raising awareness of those living with memory disorders and their caregivers. It stimulates students to learn, investigate, and connect with family and community. The Voice Library changes the digital storytelling paradigm by providing users passcode-protected access through any telephone technology. It also provides online access. Both combine audio and still-image capability. For 24/7, global access, unlike social media, subscribers' private accounts are secured on the company's server.

== See also ==
- Interactive web stories
- Visual novel
- Digital rhetoric
