= Kairos (journal) =

Academic journal

- Discipline: Computers and writing
- Language: English
- Edited by: Douglas Eyman

Publication details
- History: 1996–present
- Publisher: Independent
- Frequency: Biannually
- Open access: Yes

Standard abbreviations
- ISO 4: Kairos

Indexing
- ISSN: 1521-2300
- OCLC no.: 848199740

Links
- Journal homepage

Kairos: A Journal of Rhetoric, Technology, and Pedagogy is a biannual peer-reviewed academic journal covering the fields of computers and writing, composition studies, and digital rhetoric. It was established in 1996, and was the first academic journal to publish multimedia webtexts.

Founding editor Mick Doherty said:

This new journal has a great deal to do with kairos, particularly in terms of its appropriateness and timeliness in our field at this time. As we are discovering the value of hypertextual and other online writing, it is not only important to have a forum for exploring this growing type of composition, but it is essential that we have a webbed forum within which to hold those conversations. With this journal, the Kairos staff and authors intend to push many envelopes—of theory and pedagogy, of technology, of composition, and of professional scholarship—at a time when these efforts are vital to continued growth of our field. In essence, we've tried to make this the most kairotic journal we could.

Kairos' readership often exceeds 45,000 readers per month during issue release months.

The journal's sister site, Kairosnews, ran from 1997 to 2006, providing an online forum for discussion of issues. The editor-in-chief is Douglas Eyman (George Mason University).

The word kairos is an Ancient Greek term with meanings including "exact or critical time, season, opportunity", used in rhetoric and other fields.
