= Rhetorical circulation =

Rhetorical circulation is a concept referring to the ways that texts and discourses move through time and space. The concept seems to have been applied to texts sometime in the mid-1800s, and it is considered, by most scholars, to be either subordinate to or synonymous with the canon of rhetorical delivery, or pronuntiatio. It is something like newspaper circulation and magazine circulation in that it can involve print media, but it is not limited to these. In fact, any kind of media can circulate. Books can be loaned; Internet memes can be shared; speeches can be overheard; YouTube videos can be embedded in web pages. Some scholars have argued that speed, reach, and the materiality of texts and circuits are intrinsic to the ethics of circulation.

== Creation of publics ==
Social theorist Michael Warner has suggested that rhetorical circulation creates audiences he calls 'publics'. According to Warner, a public is, in one sense, a "concrete audience". Any text that is created to address a public is intended for circulation, but not all texts are meant to circulate. Some, like love notes or bills, are meant to be private. At the same time, circulating texts are constitutive of a public, in which channels for circulation already exist. This view of communication complicates the traditional sender/receiver model, and makes way for new ecological metaphors for rhetoric. In composition studies, scholars have argued that circulation is a helpful to models of composing that engage publics because it allows students to think more deeply about discourses, mediation, and ecologies of communication.

== As a new metaphor ==
Rhetorical circulation has recently been theorized as an alternative to the traditional Bitzerian notion of rhetorical situation. Jenny Edbauer suggests that rhetoric be seen as ecological rather than situational, where circulating texts constantly transform and condition composers, audiences, and each other. Like a biological ecology, a rhetorical ecology is not fixed or discrete, but fluid; it is constantly changing. It is therefore difficult to isolate audience, composer, text, and even exigence, because all are in constant flux, all are interacting with each other.

== Marx's Grundrisse ==
=== Economics ===
Theorists have connected rhetorical circulation to the Marxist idea of circulation, as articulated in the Grundrisse. Marx critiques the theories of classical economics, where economists like David Ricardo and Jean-Baptiste Say proposed a model of production, distribution, exchange, and consumption. In reality, Marx claims, commodities circulate, but a commodity is more than simply an object. Instead, a commodity is something like an embodied social process, and it is always conditioned by two factors: its use value and its exchange value. The use value of something refers to its potential to satisfy human needs, independent of how it is produced. The exchange value, on the other hand, refers to how something stacks up against other commodities in terms of value: what it will exchange for. These two factors are always out of balance.

=== Distribution ===
When we apply economic theories such as this one to rhetoric, some changes are inevitable. Richard Lanham has postulated an economics of attention rather than monetary currency. When we consume and forward texts, we "pay" attention to them. But with the unbalanced nature of use and exchange values in texts, circulation can be difficult to predict. We cannot know, for instance, the exchange value of a text, when understood as its relative value as compared to others in the marketplace of attention. Because of this, some theorists consider circulation to be separate from distribution, because it involves an element of unpredictability. For instance, a publisher of newspapers can distribute them to an intended audience, like residents of metropolitan Chicago. However, a photo might be snapped of a typo on the front page, and posted to Facebook: this is circulation. There is disagreement, however, about the degree to which a researcher can productively distinguish between the two.

=== Transformation ===
Scholars have also shown that rhetorical circulation, understood through a Marxist lens, involves transformation. First, ideas transform into texts, or products. After this transformation, texts can also transform into other texts. For example, a scientist might have an idea for an experiment, and that idea might transform into a research proposal. Later, the research proposal might transform into a journal article, and then a news release. Recently, scholars have demonstrated how the circulation of internet memes participates in the transformation of science and environmental communications for digital publics.
