= Gonzalo Frasca =

Video game designer

Gonzalo Frasca (born 1972) is a game designer and academic researcher focusing on serious and political videogames. His now defunct blog, Ludology.org, was cited by NBC News as a popular designation for academic researchers studying video games. For many years, Frasca also co-published Watercoolergames with Ian Bogost, a blog about serious games.

Frasca was born in Montevideo, Uruguay, where he established Powerful Robot Games, a video game studio. He is Chief Design Officer at DragonBox, a Norwegian pedagogy studio which produces math-learning videogames. Frasca is also a professor at Universidad ORT Uruguay.

In video game theory, Frasca belongs to the group of "ludologists" who consider video games to be simulations based on rules. They see video games as the first simulational media for the masses - which means a paradigm shift in media consumption and production.

Frasca's game studies are influenced by the work of Norwegian game academic Espen J. Aarseth. Beginning in December 2004, Frasca studied games at the Center for Computer Games Research at the IT University of Copenhagen. He received his PhD in Videogames studies in August 2007.

His most famous game is the art game, September 12, a response to the September 11 attacks. It is based on the political argument that a direct military response will only increase the likelihood of further terrorist attacks on the West. Despite being controversial at its launch, it is now recognized as a notable early example of both political videogame and newsgame (a term Frasca is credited with coining to refer to a videogame based on real, newsworthy events). In 2009 it received a Lifetime Achievement Award by the Knight Foundation.

== Simulation versus Narrative: Introduction to Ludology (2003) ==
This work expands on concepts of narratology and ludology as modes for framing game analysis. These concepts were established initially by Frasca in his 1999 text Ludology meets Narratology: Similitude and differences between video games and narrative. He defines ludology as the play-oriented aspects of games, such as mechanics and control schemes. Narrative aspects provide a context for the play-oriented features within the gamespace. As noted in the text's introductory paragraphs, Frasca's writing on ludology was spurred by a desire to address the inadequacies of games studies literature. He states that games studies literature of the late 1990s and early 2000s involved the framing of game analysis within dramatic and narrative frameworks. This could include the framing of games within understandings of film and written literature. There was no existing model to consider games on their own terms (namely play and interactivity); a significant limitation in academically engaging with the medium. Interactivity is an intrinsic facet of the medium, however, no formal academic discipline existed which could address it. Through the proposition of a ludic framework, Frasca aims to encourage analysts to consider how play elements interact and convey meaning. This model of game analysis works similarly to Espen Aarseth's theoretical framework of digital textual analysis involving the reading of texts as cybernetic systems.

=== Simulation versus representation ===
Frasca distinguishes between simulational and representational media, with videogames being part of the former and 'traditional' media being the latter. The key difference, he argues, is that simulations react to certain stimuli, such as configurative input data (button presses etc.), according to a set of conditions. Generally, representational media (he provides the example of a photograph) produce a fixed description of traits and sequences of events (narrative), and cannot be manipulated. He places emphasis on the importance of serious games, most notably the use of games for political purposes. Unlike traditional modes of storytelling, simulation is not binary by nature. According to Frasca, this has benefits when applied to the political propaganda simulation.

Simulation output is also discussed, with Frasca drawing attention to the argument that the sequence of signs produced by the film and the simulation look exactly the same. Frasca notes that what these commentators have failed to understand is that simulation cannot be understood solely through its output; the player's direct input is a fundamental part of simulation. This is reminiscent of Aarseth's work on user engagement in games and simulations. He argues that it is insufficient to "merely observe the audiovisual output from someone else's playing...", and that in order to fully understand an interactive digital text one must experience it first-hand.

=== Paidia and ludus ===
Frasca draws links to the game-type categorisations established by Roger Caillois in Man, Play and Games (1961). Specifically, he engages with concepts of ludus and paideia; that is, play and game, or the rule based structures of games. Frasca expands on Caillois' original definitions, and positions them in relation to narratology, ludology and contemporary games. According to Frasca, ludus is associated with more linear, narrative oriented with clearly defined goals and grounded in a set of rules. Paidia, while also based in a system of rules, is more abstract. Players are able to create their own goals within the game world in the style of emergent gameplay.

Drawing on his redefined concepts of padia and ludus, Frasca establishes varying levels in simulations which can be manipulated in order to convey ideology.

1. Simulation shared with narrative and deals with representation and events. – For example, characteristics of objects, characters, etc. He notes that "a simple switching of character skins could turn Quake into a deathmatch between Israeli's and Palestinians...the rules of the game remain unchanged...only the characters and settings are modified. However, on an ideological level, this game completely differs from the original..."
2. Manipulation of game rules. – What a player can do within a particular game model. This relates directly to the concepts of paidia and emergence; modes of exploratory play. He notes the ideological differences between narratively guided actions and emergent, player-driven actions.
3. Goal rules. – Aspects of gameplay which are a mandatory condition for 'winning'. This is in line with ludus' rule based structure.
4. Meta rules – Modification of the game world. Open source, modding etc. Frasca uses the meta-rule simauthor as a point of contrast to the author of traditional narratives.

== Influences and responses ==
While Frasca maintains the importance of play elements in games and simulation, he acknowledges the narratological paradigm should not be disregarded. He posits that it is necessary to understand the structure and elements of games, creating typologies and models for explaining game mechanics.

Since the establishment of ludology as a formal approach to reading games and simulation, numerous academics have framed their works within the ludic and narratological paradigm. However, unlike Frasca's work, scholarship has emerged which discounts the significance of the narrative. In ′Ludologists love stories, too: Notes from a debate that never took place′ (a response to misinterpretation of Frasca's position on ludology and narratology), Frasca cites Rune Klevjer's critical misunderstanding of ludic principles. Klevjer suggests that the ludologist deems anything other than pure game mechanics as essentially alien to the medium's true aesthetic form, and that games should shift toward a more abstract and play oriented models.

Frasca's ludic and narratological principles have also influenced scholarship on the cultural colonialisation of videogames. This area of study deems the common practice of framing games within filmic traditions as detrimental to game analysis, as games should "reject any intervention from other disciplines..." Furthermore, it is argued that cinema is a highly privileged medium due to the fact that it can be used to frame game analysis.

Other pro-ludic arguments have claimed that contemporary videogames are unable to effectively model player actions within the narrative. Particular areas of games studies suggest that games are unable to create a coherent ludonarrative. One of the most notable examples of this is Clint Hocking's blog post on ludonarrative dissonance. Such dissonance, according to Hocking, occurs when a game exhibits conflicting ideas expressed via narrative and gameplay means. Specifically, using the example of Irrational's Bioshock, he argues that the game's core theme of Randian self-interest (explored through the Little Sister mechanic, whereby the player has the choice to harvest a powerful substance known as ADAM from these NPCs or free them) is undermined by Jack's aiding of Atlas; a scripted and predetermined narrative sequence.

== Bibliography ==
- Frasca, G. (1999). Ludology meets Narratology: Similitude and differences between (video)games and narrative.
- Frasca, G. (2003). Simulation versus Narrative: Introduction to Ludology.
- Frasca, G. (2003). Ludologists love stories, too: notes from a debate that never took place.
