= Kenneth Bruffee =

American academic (1934–2019)

Kenneth Bruffee PhD
- Occupations: Writing Center Administrator; Director of Freshman English; Professor Emeritus

Academic background
- Education: Wesleyan University
- Alma mater: Northwestern University

Academic work
- Discipline: Writing Pedagogy Scholar & Educator
- Sub-discipline: Collaborative Learning
- Institutions: Brooklyn College
- Notable works: The Brooklyn Plan; Collaborative Learning and the Conversation of Mankind
- Notable ideas: Peer Tutoring

Kenneth A. Bruffee (September 1, 1934 – January 20, 2019) was an American writing center administrator and professor emeritus in the department of English at Brooklyn College. Often referred to as "Ken" by his friends and colleagues, he is best known for his scholarship on collaborative learning and innovations for college tutoring.

== Career ==
Bruffee graduated from Wesleyan University and earned a Ph.D. in English from Northwestern University. He taught at the University of New Mexico, Northwestern University, the University of Virginia, Columbia University, Cooper Union, and the University of Pennsylvania, but most of his career surrounded his work at Brooklyn College.

In 1966, Brooklyn College hired Bruffee initially to teach British Romantic literature. However, in 1970, CUNY implemented open admission ahead of its scheduled plans to do so, and Brooklyn College simultaneously appointed Bruffee to the position of Director of Freshman English. The sudden and multiplicative increase in enrolling students contained more racial, ethnic, socioeconomic, and linguistic diversity than the college had previously seen, and most of this new cohort was less academically prepared than previously typified college students. This increase in incoming freshmen necessitated an increase in course sections to teach them. As the Director of Freshman English, Bruffee was in charge of assigning the faculty for those sections but found that the college did not have enough faculty to cover all of the necessary roles, especially while still offering additional writing assistance outside of class. Bruffee innovated a practice that would become one of his most significant legacies: peer tutoring.

Though many colleges and universities already had writing labs of some form, Bruffee's innovation applied and broadened the budding pedagogical field of collaborative learning, which arose out of his belief in conversation as a method of knowledge-making. Throughout the 1970s, Bruffee trained and supervised the peer tutors and documented his practices. Early into this journey, he published the first peer tutoring handbook, A Short Course in Writing, in 1972. Based on his own center’s success, he penned “The Brooklyn Plan” (1978) and shortly thereafter his first book, A Short Course in Writing: Practical Rhetoric for Composition Courses, Writing Workshops, and Tutor Training Programs (1980), as a manual of sorts so that others could mimic his model.

To that aim, in 1979, Bruffee garnered a federal grant from the Fund for the Improvement of Post Secondary Education (FIPSE), enabling himself and colleagues to found and run the Brooklyn College Institute for Training Peer Tutors, which trained peer tutors and encouraged the development of writing centers, writing labs, and writing groups. This training on tutor-training program continued operating for approximately ten years. Bruffee also delivered several speeches, seminars, workshops, and talks, and wrote numerous other articles and chapters, none so famous as “Collaborative Learning and the Conversation of Mankind” (1984). This text, alongside Bruffee’s other works, led to his colleague Harvey Kail asserting in 2019 that Kenneth Bruffee deserves significant attribution for contemporary writing centers’ foundational value and methods.

While a writing program administrator at Brooklyn College, Bruffee played a leading role in the development of writing center studies, and he collaborated with both educators and administrators across several CUNY institutes and in institutions of higher learning across the country to establish peer tutoring as a standard academic support service within NYC public higher education and beyond.

Leadership roles and highlights of his career included serving as the first Chair of the Modern Language Association Teaching of Writing Division in 1976 and as a president of CAWS (now CWPA) and a founding editor of its scholarly journal, WPA: Writing Program Association, a publication for which he continued as an editor from 1978 until 1983. Bruffee also directed the Brooklyn College's Scholars Program for over thirty years, as well as its Honors Academy. Additionally, he was a Wolfe Institute Faculty Fellow from 1991-1992, garnered a Brooklyn College Broeklundian Professorship from 1991 to 1994, was a New York University Faculty Resource Network Scholar in Residence from 1998 to 2000, and an editor at Liberal Education.

Bruffee retired from Brooklyn College in 2006.

In 2007, Bruffee gave the keynote address at the 25th National Conference on Peer Tutoring and Writing, harkening back to 1984 and the NCPTW's first proceeding, which also had Bruffee as the keynote speaker, as did the 1990 proceeding. In 2008, his address from the 2007 conference was included as the first item after the editors' letters in a special issue of the Writing Center Journal which was themed after, dedicated to, and subtitled Kenneth Bruffee and the Brooklyn Plan. In addition, the Council of Writing Program Administrators dedicated their Spring 1986 issue of Journal of the Council of Writing Program Administrators, and they continue to honor Bruffee annually by bestowing the "Kenneth Bruffee Award" to particularly exemplary and impactful scholarship in their journal, WPA: Writing Program Administration.

Both while he lived and since his death in January 2019, Bruffee's works shifted thinking in disciplines and topics such as writing program administration (WPA), composition and rhetoric studies, writing center studies and their assessment, tutoring, pedagogy, interdisciplinarity, and collaborative learning. His most direct and tangible lasting impact has been on tutor training, a task for which his texts are still common required readings and guiding principles. His works have also served as lenses and frameworks beyond their initial contexts, from uses in information literacy to discussions on AI, particularly AI in Education.

== Publications ==
=== Books ===
- Collaborative Learning: Higher Education, Interdependence and the Authority of Knowledge (Johns Hopkins University Press; 1993)
- A Short Course in Writing: Composition, Collaboration and Constructive Reading (Peason, Longman; 2006)
- Elegiac Romance: Cultural Change and the Loss of the Hero in Modern Fiction (Cornell University Press; 1983)
- Doctoral Dissertation: Bruffee, K. A. (1964). Satan And The Sublime: The Meaning Of The Romantic Hero (Order No. 6503244). Available from ProQuest Dissertations & Theses Global.

=== Articles and book chapters ===
- Bruffee, K. A. (2008). What Being A Writing Peer Tutor Can Do for You. The Writing Center Journal, 28(2), 5–10. https://doi.org/10.7771/2832-9414.1700
- Bruffee, K. A. (2003). Cultivating the craft of interdependence: Collaborative learning and the college curriculum. About Campus, 7(6), 17-23. https://doi.org/10.1177/108648220300700604
- Brower, A. M., Bruffee, K. A., & Zeller, W. (2002). Do Learning Communities Discourage Binge Drinking? About Campus, 7(2), 4–13. https://doi.org/10.1177/108648220200700203
- Bruffee, K., Kogen, M., Fox, L., DeLuca, G., & Johnson, M. A. (2002). Collaboration, Conversation, and Reacculturation. In Dialogue on Writing (1st ed., pp. 63–81). Routledge. Chapter Link
- Bruffee, K. A. (2002). Taking The Common Ground Beyond Cultural Identity. Change (New Rochelle, N.Y.), 34(1), 10–17. https://doi.org/10.1080/00091380209601830
- Bruffee, K. (1999). Virtual Reference and Boundary Talk: Joining Conversations Already in Progress. The Journal of the Learning Sciences, 8(3), 509–516. https://doi.org/10.1207/s15327809jls0803&4_7
- Bruffee, K. A. (1999). Binge drinking as a substitute for a “community of learning.” The Chronicle of Higher Education, 45(22), B8. Binge Drinking as a Substitute for a ‘Community of Learning’
- Levine, G., Walzer, K., Noland, C., Bruster, D., Shumway, D. R., Bruffee, K. A., Schuman, S., & Herman, P. C. (1997). The Teaching of Literature. PMLA : Publications of the Modern Language Association of America, 112(3), 436–442. https://doi.org/10.2307/462955
- Bruffee, K. A. (1995). Sharing our toys: Cooperative Learning Versus Collaborative Learning. Change: The Magazine of Higher Learning, 27(1), 12–18. https://doi.org/10.1080/00091383.1995.9937722
- Bruffee, K. A., Palmer, P. J., Gullette, M. M., Gillespie, D., et al. (1994). The art of collaborative learning: Making the most of knowledgeable peers. Change, 26(3), 38-39. https://doi.org/10.1080/00091383.1994.9940647
- Bruffee, K. A. (1992). Science in a Postmodern World. Change: The Magazine of Higher Learning, 24(5), 18–25. https://doi.org/10.1080/00091383.1992.9937125
- Bruffee, K. A. (1986). Social Construction, Language, and the Authority of Knowledge: A Bibliographical Essay. College English, 48(8), 773 - 790. https://doi.org/10.58680/ce198611565
- Bruffee, K. A. (1985). Liberal Education, Scholarly Community, and the Authority of Knowledge. Liberal education, 71(3), 231-39. https://eric.ed.gov/?id=EJ324014
- Bruffee, K. A. (1984). Collaborative learning and the “conversation of mankind.” College English, 46(7), 635-652. https://doi.org/10.2307/376924
- Bruffee, K. A. (1983). Reading and writing as social acts. Journal of Teaching Writing, 2(2), 149-154. View of Reading and Writing as Social Acts
- Bruffee, K. A. (1982). Liberal Education and the Social Justification of Belief. Liberal Education, 68(2), 95-114. https://eric.ed.gov/?id=EJ271396
- Bruffee, K. A. (1980). Two Related Issues in Peer Tutoring: Program Structure and Tutor Training. College Composition & Communication, 31(1), 76 - 80. https://doi.org/10.58680/ccc198015970
- Beck, P., Hawkins, T., Silver, M., Bruffee, K. A., Fishman, J., & Matsunobu, J. T. (1978). Training and Using Peer Tutors. College English, 40(4), 432–449. https://doi.org/10.2307/376266
- Bruffee, K. A. (1978). The Brooklyn plan: Attaining intellectual growth through peer-group tutoring. Liberal Education, 64(4), 447-68. https://eric.ed.gov/?id=EJ194413
- Bruffee, K. A. (1973). Collaborative Learning: Some Practical Models. College English, 34(5), 634–643. https://doi.org/10.2307/375331
- Bruffee, K. A. (1972). A New Emphasis in College Teaching: The Contexts of Learning. Peabody Journal of Education, 50(1), 8–12. http://www.jstor.org/stable/1491981
- Bruffee, K. A. (1972). The way out: A critical survey of innovations in college teaching, with special reference to the December, 1971, issue of College English. College English, 33(4), 457–470. https://doi.org/10.2307/375601
- Bruffee, K. A. (1971). Elegiac Romance. College English, 32(4), 465–476. https://doi.org/10.2307/374393

== See also ==
- Writing Centers
- Peer tutors / Peer Support
- Collaborative Learning
