= My Life in Prison =

Crime fiction novel

- First edition
- Author: John Kiriamiti
- Language: English
- Publication date: 2004

My Life in Prison (2004) is the third novel in John Kiriamiti's Kenyan crime fiction series, following My Life as a Criminal, and My Life with a Criminal: Milly's Story. This series is loosely based on Kiriamiti's experiences as a young criminal in Nairobi, and was written mainly whilst he was in prison for robbery.

The events in the book are narrated against the background of an alleged incident of brutality by warders on the prisoners, at Naivasha Maximum Security Prison on 24 April 1972. This book, the best-selling Kenyan novel of all time, is currently being adapted into a film.

== Plot ==
The novel starts immediately after the arrest of protagonist Jack Zollo in My Life as a Criminal. Zollo is sentenced to twenty years of hard labour for robbery. After a few days, he decides to fake insanity to be relieved of the hard labour and a long sentence and be transferred to a less-secure mental hospital so as to be able to escape, in due course.

Eventually his game succeeds, and after two weeks Zollo is transferred to Mathare Hospital. There he meets Rashid Ibadah, a Ugandan lieutenant colonel who is also faking his insanity to escape the prison and to recover his belongings from a hotel. The two decide to escape Mathare together.

After an early escape, the pair head to the Mathare slum to change out of hospital clothes and get money for their journey. As a reward for helping him escape, Ibadah gives Zollo 1.5 Kenyan Shillings in diamonds. He hides them by a river before being captured and put in prison again, since it was clear Zollo was faking his madness.

Back in prison, Zollo becomes determined to fix his horrible record and, hopefully, to get his sentence reduced on good behaviour through the difficult prison lifestyle. He realises that prison and city life is a way of living he could not accomplish in his home village of Murang’a.

Eventually, Zollo gains some social currency in prison with both the prison authorities and other prisoners. When he is released from prison seven years early, Zollo goes back to the city and tries to use the same peaceful strategies that helped him in prison. Soon after being released, Zollo instead returns to his home village of Murang’a.

== Film adaptation ==
It was announced in November 2012 that a film would be made, based on the books. The cast and crew were selected in April 2013 with Jim Lyke starring as Jack Zollo. Kirina Productions have secured the movie rights. Filming was scheduled to begin in September 2013.

== Other works by John Kiriamiti ==
- My Life in Crime (1980)
- My Life with a Criminal: Milly's Story (1984)
- Son of Fate (1994)
- The Sinister Trophy (2000)
