= Writing centres in Canada =

Founded in 2007, the Canadian Writing Centres Association (French: association Canadienne des centres de rédaction) (CWCA/ACCR) is an independent, national, volunteer organization, representing over 120 academic writing centres in Canadian universities, colleges, high schools, prisons, and public and private companies. CWCA/ACCR has held an annual general meeting since 2008 and an annual conference since 2013, and is the publisher of the Canadian Writing Centre Review (French: revue Canadienne des centres de rédaction).

== Writing centres in Canada ==
In the British colonies of what would later become Canada, private writing instruction for students can be found in early newspaper publications. For example, in the first issue of the Halifax Gazette in March 1752, an advertisement was printed offering "Spelling, Reading, and Writing in all different Hands." The advertisement continues,

"And, for the Conveniency of grown Persons improving their learning, any of the above Art and Sciences will be taught Two Hours every Evening, to begin at 6 o'clock."

As publicly funded education was not available until the middle of the 19th century and into the 20th century in English Canada, such services were for a fee. Institutions of higher education in English Canada were not formalized until 1802, and, in Nova Scotia, for example, a system of state-subsidized education began only in 1867. While formal writing tutoring is not mentioned in the literature until the 20th century, there is occasional mention of provision of extra-curricular writing support.

Writing centres in Canadian have a history that dates to the 1960s, with the first writing centres opening in the University of Toronto, Innis College (1964) and York University (1967). Across Canada, large universities provided leadership in the development and opening of further writing centres in the 1970s and 1980s, including Dalhousie University (1971), University of Waterloo (1976), McGill University (1978), Memorial University of Newfoundland (1984), and the University of Winnipeg (1988), among others. The 1990s represented a continued surge of writing centre establishment in both large and small institutions in higher education, including University of British Columbia (1992), St. Francis Xavier University (1995), University of Saskatchewan (1995), Thompson Rivers University (formerly University College of the Caribou) (1996), and University of Ottawa (1999).

== Canadian writing centre modelling ==
Canadian writing centres were formed from models developed and honed in the U.S., where, since by 1930s, formal academic writing centres were in already in place in universities. Even so, formal activities that would be now considered writing centre work were enacted as early are 1904. These early writing supports were often used the "clinic" and "laboratory method" of writing support.

Writing centres in Canada may be divided into areas conceptually, theoretically, and in their practice: writing centres that teach and writing centres that tutor. This is further divided by tutors and instructors, whether they are faculty, professional tutors, or peer tutors. This divide is long standing in Canada, and goes to the heart of writing instruction, writing tutoring, writing support, and what writing centres do. CWCA/ACCR's Position Statement on Writing Centres in Canada provides best practices and principles for writing centres in Canada.

In 1996, Janet Giltrow, in Writing at the Centre: Language, Institution, and the Discourse on Writing Centres (1996), ponders, "In a relatively short time--some say 30 years, more say 20, and in Canada we should probably say ten years--writing centres have established themselves, become normal, and self-evident" (p. 79). Many of the early writing centres were centred in or rose out of university English departments, and were often thought of by faculty and students as 'fix-it shops', a place to go to, to have writing repaired—a "remedial crutch for those 'who do not belong in school to begin with'" (p. 81) Writing centres are instead a revolution, a movement (often compared to the open admissions movement of the 1970s and 1980s in Canada), liminal, and decolonial, among others attributes. They have been described as listening centres and co-thinking / thinking centres.

Academic writing can include those elements that are considered traditional writing (e.g., essay or case study) or textual writing, as well as less textual "digital writing projects" that "call for a broader conception of writing to include meaning-making through design and production," such as "web-essays, blogs, wikis, podcasts, videos, memes, comics, infographics, slide presentations, playlists, collages, and 3D printing." As a result, writing centres may be places of support for script writing, coding, video editing, audio recording, and graphic design.

Conferences have been held across Canada, including St. Catharines (2014, Brock University), Ottawa (2015, Carleton University), Calgary (2016, University of Alberta), Toronto (2017, OCAD University), Saskatoon (2018, University of Saskatchewan), and Vancouver (2019, Emily Carr University of Art and Design). In 2020, the national conference was postponed as a result of the COVID pandemic. In 2021 and since, conferences have been held virtually.

Chairs and presidents of CWCA/ACCR with a timeline of events
| Date | President (Chair) | Institution of President | Event during the President's tenure |
|---|---|---|---|
| 2006 | | | Initial meeting (Edmonton) |
| 2007-2009 | Chair: Martin Holock Co-Chair: Lisje de Burger (STLHE rep) | University of Ottawa | Creation of listserv (2006); CWCA/ACCR founding (2007); 1st AGM (2007-2008 Windsor); Acceptance as a SIG of STLHE (2007); 2nd AGM (2008-2009 New Brunswick); Creation of the CWCA/ACCR Newsletter |
| 2009-2010 | Nancy Marenick | St. Francis Xavier University | 3rd AGM (2009-2020 Toronto); CWCA/ACCR Newsletter; Attempt to create a national scholarship |
| 2010-2011 | Marion McKeown | Royal Military College | 4th AGM (2010-2011 Saskatoon); Negotiating with STLHE for greater autonomy |
| 2011-2012 | Linda McCloud-Bondoc | Athabasca University | 5th AGM (2011-2012 Montreal); Negotiating with STLHE for greater autonomy; Creation of community of practice (RRU) |
| 2012-2013§ | Brian Hotson | Saint Mary’s University | 6th AGM (2012-2013 Victoria); Separation from STLHE; Creation of an independent association; 1st national conference (2013 UVic); Incorporation of CWCA/ACCR; Establishment of payment and banking system |
| 2013-2014 | Theresa Hyland | University of Huron College | 7th AGM (2013-2014 St. Catharines); 2nd national conference (2014 Brock U); Creation of CWCA/ACCR constitution |
| 2014-2015 | Robin Sutherland | University of Prince Edward Island | 8th AGM (2014-2015 Ottawa); 3rd national conference (2015 Ottawa U); CWCA/ACCR responds to cuts at Laurier’s writing centre; Establishment of the Atlantic Canadian Writing Centres Assoc. as a regional affiliate; Became a national affiliate of the IWCA |
| 2016-2017 | Lucie Moussu | University of Alberta | 9th AGM (2015-2016 Calgary); 4th national conference (2016 Alberta); Special issue of CJSDW/r, Vol 26 (2016) |
| 2017-2019*⋄ | Heather Fitzgerald | Emily Carr University of Art and Design | 10th AGM (2016-2017 Toronto); 5th national conference (2017 OCAD Toronto); Special issue of CJSDW/r, Vol 27 (2017); Redevelopment of constitution and development of bylaws; 6th national conference (2018 USask Saskatoon); 11th AGM (2017-2018 Saskatoon); Creation of a repository for a CWCA/ACCR archive and documents; Creation of a conference travel grant; 7th national conference (2019 ECUAD Vancouver); 12th AGM (2018-2019 ECUAD Vancouver); Creation of a two-day conference; Special issue of CJSDW/r, Vol 30 (2019) |
| 2019-2021 | Sarah King | University of Toronto | Creation of CWCR/RCCR; 13th AGM (2019-2020 virtual); 8th national conference (2020 London - postponed); President’s Annual Report, CWCA/ACCR AGM, May 2020; 14th AGM (2020-2021 vitural); 9th national conference (2021 virtual); President’s Annual Report, CWCA/ACCR AGM, May 2021; Ratification of Commitment to Anti-Racism; Ratification of CWCA/ACCR Position Statement on Writing Centres in Canada (2021) |
| 2021-2023 | Clare Bermingham | University of Waterloo | 10th national conference (2022 virtual); President’s Annual Report, CWCA/ACCR AGM, May 2022, Video Conference; 15th AGM; 11th national conference (2023 virtual); 16th AGM; Ratification of CWCA/ACCR Statement on corporate, automated, online tutoring tools |
| 2023- | Stevie Bell | York University | Special issue of SKRIB, Vol. 1 (2024) |

(§CWCA/ACCR became independent from STLHE in 2012; *moved to a 2-year term—Fitzgerald served three years as president, as a result; ⋄ title changed from Chair to President in 2017)

== Journal ==
In 2019, the association launched the Canadian Writing Centre Review / revue Canadienne des centres de rédaction (CWCR/RCCR), which publishes on writing centres and academic writing in Canada.

== Regional associations ==
Several regional associations are connected to the CWCA/ACCR, including the Alberta Writing Centres Association (AWCA); the Atlantic Canadian Writing Centres Association (ACWCA), and the British Columbia Writing Centres Association (BCWC).
