= Eddy Kimani =

Kenyan actor (born 1978)

Eddy Kìmani
- Born: Eddy Kìmani; 31 May 1978 (age 48); Nakuru, Kenya
- Occupations: Actor, voice artist, radio presenter, mental health advocate
- Years active: 2008–present
- Notable work: Lusala (2019)
- Website: x.com/Eddykimani

Eddy Kìmani (born 31 May 1978) is a Kenyan actor, voice artist and radio presenter. He is best known for the roles in the films In a Better World, The Distant Boat and Lusala.

== Personal life ==
Eddy Kimani was born on 31 May 1978, in Nakuru, Kenya.

He married his long-time partner Nyambura Njenga in 2011. The couple has two children. He later separated from his wife and children, citing his mental depression.

== Career ==
In 2006, Kimani made his film debut with the film Money and the Cross. However, he played an uncredited role in the film. Then, in 2009, he was selected for the role "Winston Kinyang'weu" in the television serial The Agency. After that supportive role, he starred in the 2010 film In a Better World with another minor role.

First, he joined Capital FM and continued to work as a broadcaster and radio host. He also worked as a television presenter with the national broadcaster KBC and NTV. In 2014, he was appointed as the communications director for Nakuru County Government.

Apart from acting, he is also a full time mental health advocate and campaigner. He completed the Quality Rights training course developed and provided by WHO. In 2019, he took up a lead role in the television series Country Queen.

== Filmography ==
Year	Film	Role	Genre	Ref.
2006	Money and the Cross		Film	
2009	The Agency	Winston Kinyang'weu	TV series 4 episodes	
2010	In a Better World	Patient	Film	
2010	Lost in Africa	Hotel manager	Film	
2012	Nairobi Half Life	NZE Car Owner	Film	
2013	Something Necessary	Commission chairman / Radio Announcer	Film	
2013	The Distant Boat	Mr. Malombe	Film	
2019	Country Queen	Titus	TV series 6 episodes	
2019	Lusala	Max	Film	
2021	Tales of the Accidental City		Drama	

== See also ==
- My Life with a Criminal: Milly's Story
- My Life in Crime
