= John Kiriamiti =

Kenyan writer (born 1950)

- Born: John Baptista Wanjohi; 14 February 1950 (age 76); Thuita Village, Kenya Colony
- Occupations: Writer; Former bank robber
- Known for: Writing books on his criminal career

John Kiriamiti (born John Baptista Wanjohi, 14 February 1950) is a Kenyan former bank robber turned writer. Kiriamiti is best known as the writer of My Life in Crime and My Life with a Criminal: Milly's Story, which were both a sensation among Kenyan youth in the late 1980s and 1990s.

Kiriamiti was born in Thuita Village, Kamacharia, Murang'a District, in Central Kenya. He is the second of the nine children of Albert and Anne Wanjiru Kiriamiti, both primary school teachers in Murang'a.

In the years after his release from Kamiti Maximum Security Prison, he has also become a philanthropist and social reformist rehabilitating street children and thieves in Murang'a. Besides writing novels, Kiriamiti owns and edits a newspaper, The Sharpener, which he established after the government ban on the Gikuyu version, Inooro, in 1995.

== Bibliography ==
Kiriamiti's books include:

- My Life in Crime – 1980
- My Life with a Criminal: Milly's Story- 1984
- Son of Fate – 1994
- The Sinister Trophy – 2000
- My Life in Prison – 2004
- The Abduction Squad
- City Carjackers

This article incorporates text available under the CC BY-SA 3.0 license.
