= Meja Mwangi =

Kenyan writer (1948–2025)

- Born: David Dominic Mwangi; 27 December 1948; Nanyuki, Colony and Protectorate of Kenya
- Died: 11 December 2025 (aged 76); Malindi, Kenya
- Education: Nanyuki Secondary School, Kenyatta College, University of Leeds
- Occupations: Author; screenwriter
- Agent: Annemarie Friedli
- Known for: One of Kenya's leading novelists; author of children's books
- Notable work: Kill Me Quick; Going Down River Road; The Cockroach Dance
- Awards: Fellow in Writing at the University of Iowa (1975–76). For awards for literary works, see §Meja Mwangi#Prizes and awards
- Website: mejamwangi.com

David Dominic Mwangi (27 December 1948 – 11 December 2025), known by his pen name, Meja Mwangi, was a Kenyan writer. Apart from writing books, he worked in the film industry, including in screenwriting, assistant directing, and casting.

== Life and career ==
Mwangi was born David Dominic Mwangi in Nanyuki, Colony and Protectorate of Kenya, and was educated at Nanyuki Secondary School, Kenyatta College, and briefly at the University of Leeds. He then worked for the French Broadcasting Corporation doing odd jobs and the British Council in Nairobi as Visual Aids Officer, before turning to writing full-time. He was Fellow in Writing at the University of Iowa (1975–76).

After a long tenure on Kenya's and Africa's publishing scene, Mwangi moved to the United States, having gained international recognition and won several awards.

His best-known early work includes the novels Kill Me Quick (1973), Going Down River Road (1976), and The Cockroach Dance (1979), which illustrate the urban landscapes of Kenya, the struggle against poverty, and the AIDS epidemic.

Mwangi died in Malindi, Kenya, on 11 December 2025, at the age of 76. (Note: The reference mentions his age upon death as 78, but this does not match the year of his birth, which makes him 76 upon death.)

== Prizes and awards ==
=== For general readers ===
- Jomo Kenyatta Prize for Literature for Kill Me Quick (1974 – English winner); The Last Plague (2001 – English winner); Boy Gift (2007 – English Youth third place); Big Chief (2009 – English Adult Fiction third place).
- Lotus Prize for Literature (1978) presented by the Afro-Asian Writers' Association (aka Association of Asian and African Writers)

=== For juvenile readers ===
- Deutscher Jugendliteraturpreis (German Youth Literature Prize), for Kariuki und sein weißer Freund. Eine Erzählung aus Kenia (Little White Man (1990), title changed to The Mzungu Boy (1992))
- Le Prix Lire au College for Kariuki (1992)
- American Library Association (USA) Notable Children's Books Award for Older Readers, The Mzungu Boy (2006)

=== Shortlist ===
- Noma Award (Honourable mention), for Bread of Sorrow (1989)
- International Dublin Literary Award (Nomination), for The Last Plague (2002)

== Literary works ==
=== In English ===
- Kill Me Quick. East African Ecucational Publishers. 1973.
- Carcase for Hounds. Peak Library. Heinemann Educational. 1974. ISBN 0-435-90145-1. Adapted for the film "Cry Freedom".
- Taste of Death. Peak Library. Kenya: East African Publishing House. 1975.
- Going Down River Road. Peak Library. Heinemann. 1976. ISBN 978-0435901769.
- Mwangi, Meja (1979). The Bushtrackers. Longman Drumbeat. ISBN 0-582-78525-1.
- Mwangi, Meja (1979). The Cockroach Dance. Longman. ISBN 0-582-64276-0.
- Bread of Sorrow. 1987.
- The Return of Shaka. 1989.
- Mwangi, Meja (1989). Weapon of Hunger. Longman Kenya. ISBN 9966-49-813-3.
- Jimi the Dog. 1990.
- Striving for the Wind. Peak Library. Heinemann International Literature. 1992. ISBN 978-0435909796.
- The Hunter's Dream. United Kingdom: Macmillan Education. 1994. ISBN 978-0333580028.
- The Last Plague (Vitabu Vya Nyota Series, 2). Peak Library. East African Educational Publisher. 1997. ISBN 978-9966250827.
- Mountain of Bones. 2001.
- The Boy Gift. HM Books. 2006. ISBN 978-1-84728-471-6.
- The Mzungu Boy. Canada: Groundwood Books. 2006. ISBN 978-0888996640.
- Mwangi, Meja (2007). Mama Dudu, the Insect Woman. ISBN 978-1-84728-468-6.
- Baba Pesa. HM Books Intl. 2007. ISBN 978-0-9796476-1-1.
- Mwangi, Meja (2007). The Big Chiefs. ISBN 978-0-9796476-3-5.
- Mwangi, Meja (2007). Gun Runner. HM Books Intl. ISBN 978-0-9796476-0-4.
- Free?: Stories Celebrating Human Rights. Walker. 2009. ISBN 978-1406318302.
- Rafiki - Man Guitar. HM Books Intl. 2013.
- Christmas Without Tusker. HM Books. 2015. ISBN 978-0-982012680.

=== Translations ===
- Carcaça para càès [Carcase for Hounds] (in Portuguese). Translated by Fernanda Tomé da Silva. Lisboa: Ediçoès 70. 1980.
- Wie ein Aas für Hunde [Carcase for Hounds] (in German). Translated by Gunter Böhnke [in German]. Leipzig: Philipp Reclam. 1985.
- Narben des Himmels [Striving for the Wind] (in German). Wuppertal: Peter Hammer Verlag. 1992. ISBN 978-3872944719.
- Kariuki (aventures avec le petit homme blanc) [The Mzungu Boy] (in French). 1992.
- Mister Rivers letztes Solo [Weapon of Hunger] (in German). Wuppertal: Peter Hammer Verlag. 1995. ISBN 978-3872946409.
- Mwangi, Meja (1995). Kariuki und sein weißer Freund [The Mzungu Boy] (in German). Lamuv. ISBN 978-3889773227.
- Die Achte Plage [The Last Plague] (in German). Translated by Susanne Koehler. Wuppertal: Peter Hammer Verlag. 1997. ISBN 978-3872947758.
- La Ballade des perdus [Kill Me Quick] (in French). Translated by Françoise Balogun. Editions Dapper. 2001. ISBN 978-2906067646.
- Mwangi, Meja, ed. (2002). Descente a River Road [Going Down River Road] (in French). Translated by Jean-Baptiste Evette. Paris: Dapper. ISBN 978-2906067813.
- Happy Valley [The Boy Gift] (in German). Translated by Thomas Brückner. Wuppertal: Peter Hammer Verlag. 2006. ISBN 9783779500513.
- Das Buschbaby [Mama Dudu, the Insect Woman] (in German). Translated by Thomas Brückner. Wuppertal: Peter Hammer Verlag. 2007. ISBN 9783779501534.
- Big Chiefs [The Big Chiefs] (in German). Translated by Thomas Brückner. Wuppertal: Peter Hammer Verlag. 2009. ISBN 9783779502319.
- Rafiki [Rafiki – Man Guitar] (in German). Translated by Thomas Brückner. Wuppertal: Peter Hammer Verlag. 2014. ISBN 9783779504825.
- Tanz der Kakerlaken [The Cockroach Dance] (in German). Translated by Jutta Himmelreich. Wuppertal: Peter Hammer Verlag. 2015. ISBN 9783779505280.
- Mwangi, Meja (2002). Descente à River Road (in French). Dapper. ISBN 978-2906067813.
- Nairobi, River Road [Going Down River Road] (in German). Wuppertal: Peter Hammer Verlag. 1982. ISBN 978-3872942012.
- Mwangi, Meja (2001). Die Wilderer [The Bushtrackers] (in German). Unionsverl. ISBN 978-3293202184.

== Theatre, screenplays, and other adaptations ==
- Power. HM Books. 2009. ISBN 978-0-9796476-9-7. (adaptation of The Big Chiefs – 2007)
- Mwangi, Meja (2009). Blood Brothers. HM Books Intl. ISBN 978-0-9820126-0-4. (adaptation of Mama Dudu, the Insect Woman – 2007)

== Filmography ==
- Assistant director (1985). Out of Africa.
- Second assistant director (1987). White Mischief.
- Casting director (1988). The Kitchen Toto.
