= Black Star Nairobi =

2013 novel by Mukoma wa Ngugi

- Author: Mukoma wa Ngugi
- Language: English
- Genre: Novel
- Publisher: Melville Crime International
- Publication date: 2013
- Publication place: United States
- Media type: Print (paperback)
- Pages: 272 pp (first edition)
- ISBN: 978-1612192109
- Preceded by: Nairobi Heat

Black Star Nairobi is a Kenyan crime fiction novel written by Mukoma wa Ngugi, the son of Kenyan novelist Ngugi wa Thiong’o. The novel was published by Melville House International in 2013; it is a sequel to Mukoma's first novel, Nairobi Heat. Black Star Nairobi focuses on two detectives who investigate a hotel bombing and a murder that are linked. The novel's backdrop is the 2007 presidential elections in Kenya, which ended in violence.

== Synopsis ==
Ishmael, an African American detective originally from Madison, Wisconsin, relocates to Kenya and starts a detective agency called the Black Star Agency with his associate, O (short for Odhiambo). Ishmael and O's initial investigations involve odd cases, such as recovering “stolen” male gonads and cases of witchcraft; the only reason that the detectives are willing to take on these cases is that they are desperate for cash. They suddenly jump at the opportunity to investigate a new case involving a man who has been murdered and discarded in the Ngong Forest. They eventually realize that the man's murder might be linked to a later bombing of the Norfolk Hotel in downtown Nairobi, which leaves ten Americans dead. Over the course of the novel, Ishmael and O's case becomes more complicated when the results of the presidential election prompt tribal violence. Forces working against the two detectives try to keep them from investigating the case. The constant tug-of-war leads the detectives around the world, from Nairobi to Oakland, California to Mexico and back to Nairobi again.

== Themes in the novel ==
=== Violence ===
The novel takes place in 2007, when Kenya's troubled presidential election resulted in ethnic violence between Kikuyus and Luos. Although the bombing of the hotel in the novel is fictitious, it is based on real acts of violence committed by ethnic gangs, such as the slaughtering of large groups of people with machetes and the burnings of Christian churches. On the post-election violence, Mukoma responded, "In this novel I'm driven by the question of violence. In the post-electoral violence of 2007 it was a sort of intimate violence where it was neighbor-against-neighbor — people who knew each other. And there are a lot of questions that arose ... questions of class, the question of the whole democratic process. So I wanted to have characters, you know, who are running around trying to do their case, you know, but all the while being drawn back, you know, by the power, by the powerful nature of the violence that broke out."

=== Invisibility ===
Another prominent theme in the novel is that of invisibility. Worlds that Ishmael never knew existed are revealed in the novel, such as the Tavern where police officers, professional criminals and prostitutes form working relationships and provide each other tips on how to solve crimes. Ishmael also deals extensively with his feelings of invisibility—in the United States, he is seen as merely a black man, but in Kenya, his invisibility is replaced with high (and awkward) visibility. His visibility as an American also proves to be dangerous for him, as he keeps guarded against criminals who try to commit crimes against foreigners.
