= My Life with a Criminal: Milly's Story =

1989 novel by John Kiriamiti

- Author: John Kiriamiti
- Language: English
- Series: My Life in Crime trilogy
- Genre: Crime fiction
- Publisher: Spear Books (Kenya)
- Publication date: 1989
- Publication place: Kenya
- Media type: Hardback
- Pages: 148
- ISBN: 9966-46-768-8
- Preceded by: My Life in Crime
- Followed by: My Life in Prison

My Life with a Criminal is a 1989 novel by Kenyan author John Kiriamiti. It is the sequel to Kiriamiti's first book in the My Life... trilogy, My Life in Crime, and is told from the point of view of his girlfriend, Milly. A film adaptation of the trilogy was announced in the early 2010s but later stalled.

== Background ==
John Kiriamiti was a real-life criminal in Kenya during the 1960s and 1970s in the wake of the country's independence. Kiriamiti, under the alias Jack Zollo, met and fell in love with Miriam "Milly" Nyambui after finding her school ID on the ground near a bus stop and returning it to her. Kiriamiti, who published the book in his own name, appropriated Milly's voice to tell the story of his criminality from her point of view.

== Synopsis ==
Milly recounts her life leading up to that fateful day when Jack was waiting outside her school to return her ID that he found on the ground. She discusses the dates that Jack would take her on and how they had to be conscious of her family's desires for them, such as not having sex before marriage. Milly and Jack move in together, and Milly begins picking up on signs that indicate that Jack is not a car salesman, as he's led her to believe, but a criminal. When the realization hits her, she is shocked that she has been lied to by Jack for this long and struggles with her emotions regarding the situation. Milly tries to put aside her worry over realizing Jack is a criminal and live a normal life with him. She routinely tries to get Jack to admit that he is a criminal, but he always evades her questions and begins accusing her of being mentally ill. She later witnesses Jack in the midst of committing a crime, which greatly upsets her. Jack continues to treat Milly poorly for worrying about his well-being in his line of work. Milly is present at a bank during one of Jack and his accomplices’ heists. She leaves unharmed, but furious with Jack. Captain comes to inform Milly that Jack has been arrested, and she plans to visit him in jail. Milly visits Jack in jail and he is rude to her. He is sentenced to a couple weeks in jail. Much to Milly's surprise, Jack escapes and is home one evening when she returns from work. Milly pleads with Jack to leave his life as a criminal and threatens to end their relationship if he does not. She also informs him that she is pregnant and that she wants to finally marry, to which he does not agree. Jack leaves the country, forcing Milly to adjust to life alone. He returns one day and vows to stop being a criminal so that they can marry and have a quiet life, but soon goes back on his word and becomes involved in more bank robberies. The police again capture Jack and after a few days in prison, he is sentenced to twenty years. Milly recounts the trial from her position as a witness and admits that her love for Jack ended there. Milly suffers a broken heart, but visits Jack in prison, sometimes taking their son with her. Milly becomes pregnant again, but with another man, so she stops visiting Jack to keep him from finding out. Much to Milly's surprise, Jack shows up at the house after six years of not having seen each other, and Jack realizes that Milly is with someone else and has had another child. The two accept that their lives must continue one without being together.

== Major characters ==
- Miriam "Milly" Nyambui - Jack Zollo's girlfriend from whose point of view his life in crime is told
- John Kiriamiti a.k.a. Jack Zollo - Milly's boyfriend who worries her with his criminality
- Captain Ngugi - a criminal friend of Jack's
- Zollo Junior - Milly and Jack's son
- Tony - man with whom Milly becomes involved after Jack is sentenced to twenty years in prison
- Milly's daughter - baby girl Milly has with Tony
- Mumbi - Milly's sister who gets married
- Jacqueline Mbogo - woman who Jack marries after getting out of prison

== Critical response ==
My Life with a Criminal, being a follow-up to the bestselling My Life in Crime, itself achieved bestseller status in Kenya. The novel adds to Kiriamiti's legacy as an acclaimed Kenyan author.

== Film Adaptation ==
My Life with a Criminal will be included in director Neil Schell's movie My Life in Crime, which is an adaptation of Kiriamiti's trilogy. The film will star famous Nigerian actor Jim Iyke as Jack and other actors including Ainea Ojiambo, Janet Kirina, Abubakar Mwenda, Melvin Alusa, Jeff Koinange, Lenana Kariba and Eddy Kimani. Kiriamiti himself may make a cameo in the film. Production for the movie reportedly costs 35 million KES (US$412 thousand).

== See also ==
- List of Kenyan authors
