= Lusala =

2020 Kenyan film by Mugambi Nthiga

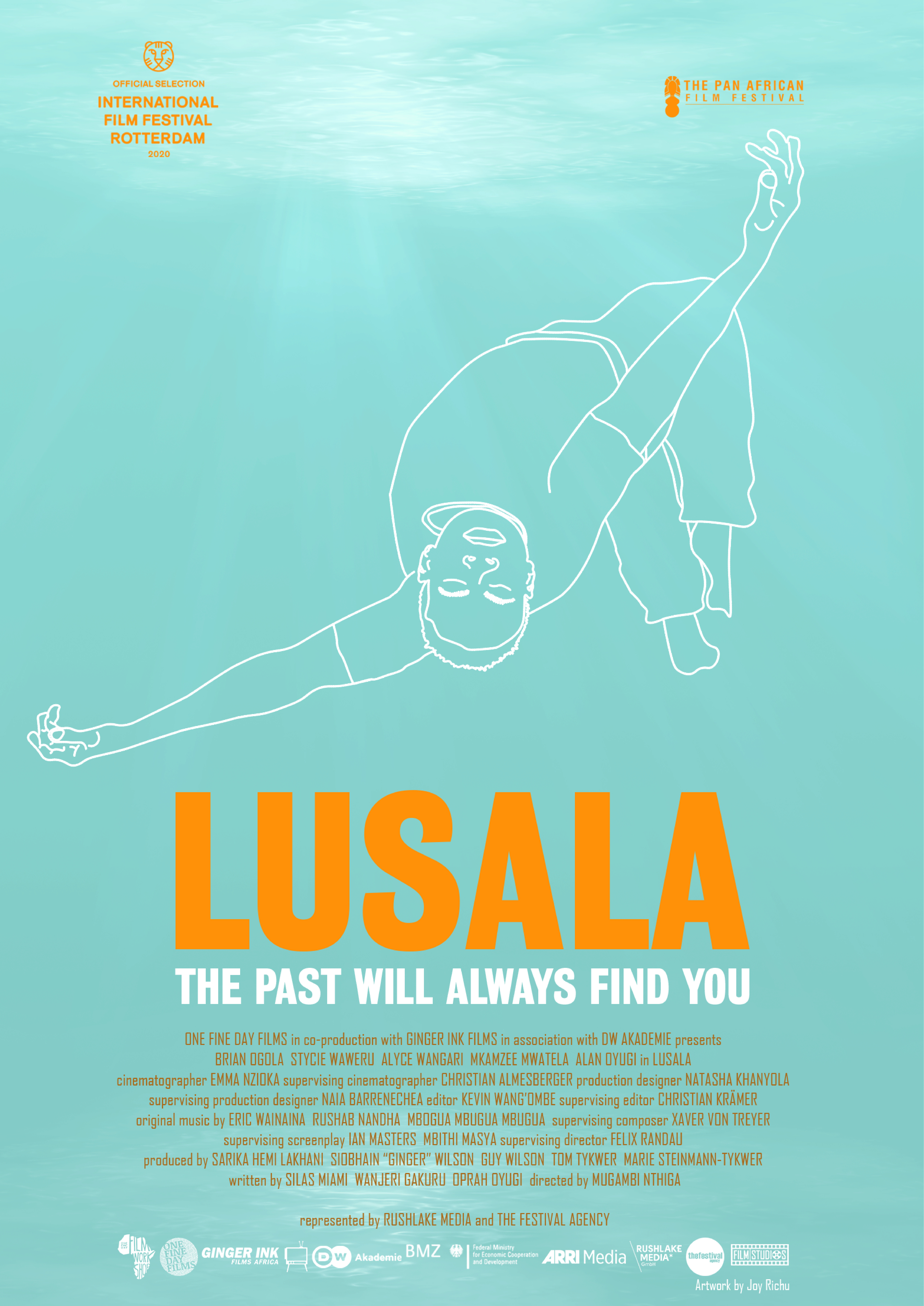
- Directed by: Mugambi Nthiga
- Screenplay by: Silas Miami; Wanjeri Gakuru; Oprah Oyugi
- Produced by: Tom Tykwer; Marie Steinmann; Sarika Hemi Lakhani; Ginger Wilson; Guy Wilson
- Starring: Brian Ogola; Alyce Wangari; Stycie Waweru
- Music by: Eric Wainaina; Rushab Nadha; Mbogua Mbugua Mbugua
- Production companies: One Fine Day Films; Ginger Ink Films
- Distributed by: Rushlake Media
- Release date: 6 June 2019
- Running time: 65 minutes
- Countries: Kenya; Germany
- Languages: English; Swahili

Lusala is a 2019 Kenyan drama film written by Silas Miami, Wanjeri Gakuru and Oprah Oyugi, and directed by Mugambi Nthiga on his directorial debut. The film stars Brian Ogola, Alyce Wangari, Stycie Waweru, Mkamzee Mwatela and Alan Oyugi in the lead roles. The film is based on the life of a 22 year old young man Lusala, who is caught between his personal mental health issues and his sibling affection. The film had its initial release in Kenya on 6 June 2019 during the NBO Film Festival and was also screened at a few other international film festivals.

== Cast ==
- Brian Ogola as Lusala
- Alyce Wangari as Joma
- Stycie Waweru as Bakhita
- Mkamzee Mwatela as Beatrice
- Alan Oyugi as Onesmus
- Eddy Kimani as Max
- Charlie Karumi as photographer
- Nice Githinji as Maggie
- Gitura Kamau as Sospeter
- Abu Majid as Lincoln
- Shawn Karuga Igamba as Young Lusala
- Melvin Alusa as Baba Lusala
- Peter Kawa as Pastor
- Odek Ochung as Sabuk
- Caroline Midimo as Tegla
- Zara Waiyego Macharia as Young Joma
- Isaya Evans as Asembo
- Alfred Calypso as Mechanic

== Synopsis ==
Lusala, a young man who is rescued from his abusive alcoholic father and moves in with an affluent family in the capital of Kenya, Nairobi. His uncle Onesmus and his aunt Beatrice adopted him from the rural Kenya about twelve years ago. They raised him together with their only daughter Joma. Once when Beatrice learns of the sibling affection of Lusala towards Joma, she requests her husband to guide Lusala to start a life on his own will. Lusala soon obtains a job and moves into an apartment in Nairobi quite close to his workplace with the help of his uncle. Things turn swiftly as Lusala's younger sister Bakhita who was in a boarding school figures out the flat where Lusala lives.

== Production ==
The film director made his directorial debut through this project, returning to Kenya after enrolling in Film Academy Baden-Württemberg for a brief period of five months. The film was jointly produced by German production studio company One Fine Day Films and Ginger Ink Films Africa. The project was also funded by the German Federal Ministry for Economic Cooperation and Development.

== Release ==
The film was initially released on 6 June 2019 at the 3rd edition of the Nairobi Film Festival and opened to positive reviews from critics. The film was also selected to be premiered in a few other film festivals. It was also premiered at the International Film Festival Rotterdam on 27 January 2020 and also had its premiere at the Göteborg Film Festival in Sweden on 31 January 2020.

It was also screened at the Toronto Black Film Festival on 16 February 2020 and it was also selected to be premiered at the Montreal International Black Film Festival in September 2020. The film was also screened at the 2020 Durban International Film Festival. It was also streamed via Showmax on 17 December 2020.

== Awards and nominations ==
The film also received several awards and nominations at international film festivals. In November 2020, the film notably won the Rimbaud Award at the Les Rimbaud du Cinéma festival which was held at the world's oldest active cinema in France.

| Year | Award | Category | Result |
|---|---|---|---|
| 2019 | Kalasha Awards | Best Feature Film | Nominated |
| 2019 | Kalasha Awards | Best Lead Actor | Nominated |
| 2020 | Durban International Film Festival | Best Film | Nominated |
| 2020 | Les Rimbaud du Cinéma | Rimbaud Award | Won |
