= Carcase for Hounds =

1974 novel by Kenyan writer Meja Mwangi

Carcase For Hounds
- Author: Meja Mwangi
- Language: English
- Publication date: 1974
- Publication place: Kenya
- ISBN: 0-415-23019-5
- Preceded by: Kill Me Quick
- Followed by: Taste of Death

Carcase for Hounds is a novel by Kenyan writer Meja Mwangi first published in 1974. The novel concerns the Mau Mau liberation struggle during the latter days of British colonial rule and attempts, by the actions of the main protagonists, to show how Mau Mau was organized and why it took so long for the colonial government to defeat them. Carcase for Hounds received mixed reviews. The novel was also adapted into a movie by Ola Balogun, Cry Freedom (1981; not to be confused with the more famous 1987 film of the same name).

== Plot ==
The novel concerns the conflict between the fictional General Haraka, a leader of the Mau Mau, and British forces representing the colonial government, led by Captain Kingsley. Haraka is a former village chief whose disagreement with Kingsley, before the conflict, causes him to consider rebelling against the British.

It is set primarily in remote portions of Kenya, where the fighting took place in rain forests and on mountains.

== Reception ==
The novel received mixed reviews by critics. J. Burns, writing for the journal Books Abroad, criticized the book for being largely action, with only superficial plot and characters. Burns did, however, praise Mwangi's prose and descriptive abilities. G. D. Killam criticized the book for reasons similar to Burns, faulting the shallow development of characters others than those involved in the top hierarchy of respective the British and rebel forces.

To the contrary, Charles R. Larson, also writing for Books Abroad, said that the fact that the novel alternates between the perspective of the Mau Mau and the British forces, which Charles R. Larson, also writing for Books Abroad, said contributed to a well-thought out and fast-paced plot.
