= Nairobi Heat =

2011 play by Mũkoma wa Ngũgĩ

- Author: Mukoma wa Ngugi
- Language: English
- Publication date: 13 September 2011
- Publication place: Kenya
- ISBN: 1-935-55464-6
- Followed by: Black Star Nairobi

Nairobi Heat is a novel written by Kenyan writer Mukoma Wa Ngugi. The novel was published in September 2011. A young white woman is discovered dead. On the doorstep of African peace campaigner Joshua Hakizimana, a professor at a university in Madison, The ruling class is reluctant to prosecute the brave campaigner, so they send Ishmael, an African American investigator, to Kenya to investigate if Hakizimana is being set up by long-standing Rwandan rivals.

== Plot ==
On the doorstep of African peace campaigner Joshua Hakizimana, a professor at a university in Madison, Wisconsin, a young white woman is discovered dead. The ruling class is reluctant to prosecute the brave campaigner, so they send Ishmael, an African American investigator, to Kenya to investigate if Hakizimana is being set up by long-standing Rwandan rivals.

Ishmael expects to be welcomed like a long-lost son when he arrives in what he believes to be his homeland, but the complete reverse happens. The local Africans nickname him "Mzungu," a racial slur for "white man," because they believe he is a spoilt affluent man who has been accustomed to a luxurious American lifestyle. The difficult teachings that Ishmael must learn continue. He soon finds out that rape—even of children—is frequently ignored and that law and order in the densely populated Nairobi is, at best, patchy. Shaken by this deliberate blindness, Ishmael finds himself at odds with many in the community, including his new friend, the pot-smoking Detective David Odhiambo, after he rescues a young rape victim.

However, not everything in Nairobi's settlement colonies is affected by poverty and violent. Ishmael falls in love with Madeline, a former RPA member who was frequently sexually assaulted by "genocidaires" until she was saved by Hakizimana, the activist Ishmael is attempting to clear of murder. Madeline tells the rape victim Ishmael has rescued, "Sister, there are no second chances in this cruel country on cruel continent."

=== The novel's engagement with migration and Afropolitanism ===
Nairobi Heat has contributed to scholarly debates concerned with transnational migration. The great Kenyan thriller is listed among the contemporary African works through which a wider, multilingual and transnational literary tradition can be discussed. Published not long after Bisi Ojediran's A Daughter for Sale which narrates an investigation that strides, Europe, the USA, Mali, and Nigeria, Mukoma Wa Ngugi's Nairobi Heat and the former have encouraged a new wave of African thrillers that incorporate the wider themes of multilingualism and transnational literary tradition. Examples of this new wave include Donald Besong's short thriller Bleeding Stubs with backdrops of the African nations cup, mountaineering, post-colonialism, and the Ejagham language, as well as Kwei Quartey's The Missing American that follows the investigation of Ghanaian internet-fraud networks and a trans-Atlantic romance scam. From an African literature lens, Nairobi Heat is therefore not only entertaining and thematically rich, but very much in conversation with subsequent African authors.
