= Writing fellow =

A Writing Fellow or Fellow in Writing is a tutor or consultant who assists with college and university writing instruction in specific courses or academic fields. Whereas most Writing Center tutors are generalists, ready to work with writing from any course or field, Writing Fellows are specialists. Often working within a Writing Center or Writing Across the Curriculum program, they typically provide oral and/or written feedback on papers to students in an upper-division writing class. A Writing Fellow is most often a peer tutor; however, the term "Writing Fellow" is also sometimes used for faculty members who advise others on teaching, assigning, and responding to student writing in their specific disciplines.

== See also ==
- Composition studies
- Writing Center
