= The Mzungu Boy =

2006 novel by Meja Mwangi

- First edition
- Author: Meja Mwangi
- Genre: Historical fiction
- Set in: Kenya
- Publisher: Groundwood Books
- Publication date: 1990
- Publication place: English
- Media type: Print

The Mzungu Boy is a novel by Meja Mwangi. It is set in Kenya during the 1950s; during that time, the country was under British rule. The British colony is facing a Kenyan uprising known as the Mau Mau Rebellion. The majority of the fertile farmland is under British control, and the best the Kenyans can hope for is to work the land as tenant farmers, giving the majority of their yield to the British. While the Kenyans work the land, they live under oppressive conditions and under constant threat of violence. The Mau Mau rebellion seeks to rid the land of the British colonizers and give the country back to Kenyans.

== Synopsis ==
The narrator and main character is Kariuki, a young Kenyan boy living under the oppressive rule of a British plantation owner named Bwana Ruin. While near a watering hole, Kariuki meets Bwana's nephew Nigel, who is fishing. Nigel is a white boy from Britain staying in Kenya for the summer. He is one year younger than Kariuki and is unaware of the systematic oppression of the Kenyan people. Kariuki and Nigel quickly become friends. Nigel gains the title of "the Mzungu Boy", meaning "white boy", by the older boys of the village. Nigel immediately falls in love with hunting on the prairies of Africa. He especially enjoys hunting Old Moses, which, according to Kariuki, is the oldest, toughest warthog in the world. Kariuki's older brother, Hari, is part of the Mau Mau rebellion. During one of Nigel's and Kariuki's hunting expeditions, they get separated. Bwana Ruin calls in the British army to search for Nigel. When Kariuki goes to search for Nigel, he finds him captured by the Mau Mau. Kariuki frees Nigel but while they try to escape, they both get captured by the Mau Mau. Although the Mau Mau want to kill them both, Kariuki's brother Hari frees them. Nigel and Kariuki run back to the town, while the Mau Mau attempt to flee from the British soldiers by hiding in the mountains. When the boys get back to the plantation, they go to Bwana Ruin's estate to find that British soldiers have found and killed Hari as he tried to flee with the Mau Mau rebels. Kariuki runs out of the town, overcome with emotion. The book ends with Nigel, "the Mzungo Boy", finding and comforting Kariuki.

== Characters ==
- Bwana Ruin: British landowner in Kenya; Sternly controls his land under threat of violence and death.
- Masmab Ruin: Wife of Bwama Ruin; claims the only reason that Bwama Ruin married her was because she was wealthy.
- Nigel: "The Mzungu Boy"; young British boy, nephew of Bwama Ruin; A year younger than the narrator and in Kenya only for the summer; becomes good friends with Kariuki
- Kariuki: The narrator and main character of the story; a young boy full of adventure; his only real friend is the "Mzungu Boy", Nigel.
- Father: Father of Kariuki; Bwamba Ruin's personal chef; extremely stern, rules house under threat of violence.
- Mother: Mother of Kariuki; stern, motherly figure, runs the house and keeps Kariuki busy with chores and tasks.
- Hari: Kariuki's older brother; rough, stern, and violent towards Kariuki; member of the Mau Mau rebellion against Bwama Ruin and the colonization of Kenya.
- Grandmaster: Dean of the boarding school Kariuki attends; very stern and unflinching in his punishments.
- Father Mario: Italian Catholic man who owns and operates the church; Kariuki describes him as the most fearsome man, after Bwana Ruin.

== Reception ==
CM Magazine reviewed the book, rating it four out of four stars. The Bulletin of the Center for Children's Books also wrote a review.

=== Awards and recognition ===
The Mzungu Boy received the 2006 American Library Association Notable Children's Books Award for Older Readers and the 2006 Children's Africana Book Award – Best Book for Older Readers, and also made it into the Society of School Librarians Honour Book in 2006.
