= Online Writing Lab =

Website offering resources on writing

An Online Writing Lab (OWL) is often an extension of a university writing center. Online writing labs offer help to students and other writers by providing literacy materials, such as handouts and slide presentations. Writers may also submit questions electronically for feedback. Many OWLs are open to people unaffiliated with the specific institution. Online writing labs are a way for distance learners to access learning resources remotely.

== OWL services ==
There are two types of services online writing labs provide: educational resources and online tutoring. Purdue University, in West Lafayette, Indiana, has its OWL freely available online to all. Its resources includes handouts, specific subject information, resources geared towards students in grades 7–12, and citation formatting help with MLA, APA and other forms. Online tutoring can be asynchronous, as with email, or synchronous, as with a phone or video call.

== OWL history ==
In 1976, the Department of English at Purdue University asked Muriel "Mickey" Harris to establish a writing lab, a campus-based service designed to assist learners in their rhetorical writing processes. Harris began the writing lab by collaborating with a team of graduate assistants, who worked one-to-one with student writers, often authoring handouts to reinforce lessons in the writing lab. Harris and the tutors sent paper copies of their materials to individuals beyond Purdue University who had contacted the writing lab, requesting information on writing, citation, or research; these resources later became available electronically, including through email requests in 1993. Purdue discontinued their email service, OWL Mail, in 2016. Harris and the Purdue Writing Lab launched its OWL on the web, in 1995, then among the first OWLs on the Internet. Having made its library of resources available electronically, the Purdue OWL became accessible to millions of users worldwide.
