= Kill Me Quick =

1973 novel by Meja Mwangi

Kill Me Quick is a 1973 novel by Kenyan writer Meja Mwangi. The novel won the Jomo Kenyatta Prize for Literature in 1974.

== Plot ==
The story follows Meja and Maina, two young boys who move to the city after obtaining their secondary school diplomas. They hope to find jobs in order to support their families back home. Initially unsuccessful, the pair live in dumpsters, eating rotten fruit and stale cakes, unable to return home as failures. Eventually, they obtain jobs at a farm working for a very rich family. Maina causes problems in the house while blaming Meja, who suffers the consequences. Meja is put on half rations, moved from job to job, then has his rations almost completely revoked. After Maina's biggest episode, the pair lose their jobs. Maina and Meja split after Maina steals from a store and gets Meja in trouble. Meja flees home only to return to the city and work in a coal mine. Maina joins a gang in "shanty land," led by a boy named Razor who claims they went to school together. Here, Maina attempts to run a scheme selling milk to clients in the area, which he has stolen from the rich neighborhood. Eventually, he is caught. The pair meet up again in prison, but soon go their separate ways. Meja continues to go in and out of prison, and Maina ends up on trial for murder.

== Themes ==
Treatment of women

Like many other postcolonial Kenyan novels, women are depicted as objects for sexual pleasure, or as Nici Nelson puts it, only there as "screws for the main characters." Sara, Razor's girlfriend, is there for the sole purpose of allowing him to obtain pleasure in front of his gang. Maina's girlfriend Dehliah is mentioned briefly, and she works as a "barmaid," also known as a prostitute.

Disillusionment with Independence

Ayo Kenhinde remarks that Kill Me Quick' "presents a harsh account of urban life in postcolonial Kenya." The novel opens with the lines:

Meja sat by the ditch swinging his legs this way and that. A few people passed by engrossed in their daily problems and none of them gave the lanky youth a thought. But the searching eyes of Meja missed nothing. They scrutinized the ragged beggars who floated ghostly past him as closely as they watched the smart pot-bellied executives wrinkling their noses at the foul stench of backyards. And between these two types of beings, Meja made comparison..."

Kenhinde remarks that this is what Mwangi sees every day, and that "he has a vision of life as hell." Meja illustrates how what he sees is so much less than what he was anticipating, which is a general discourse among the genre. Arlene Elder echoes this idea of disillusionment, coining what she terms the 'pursuit of the Kenyan Dream." Within the novel, the protagonists are "Frustrated again and again by a hypocritical society that pays lip service to the value of formal education, but fails to reward those who believe it promises." Like the American Dream, the Kenyan Dream is unable to be achieved, and Meja and Mania are left to suffer.

Urban Geography

Sarah Smiley uses Kill Me Quick and the rest of Mwangi's "urban novels" to illustrate the pitfalls of the urban centers. Smiley uses them as a teaching tool for students, believing that these fictional accounts are accurate representations of real urban experiences. Passages are selected and used to create a geography for a Kenyan urban center, which is then used to teach students the similarities between other cities. The novel's urban landscape serves to highlight the corruption and crime of the plot, but it is also a place where people live and move about in their daily lives, a concept few scholars address.
