= Links of a Chain =

Links of a Chain is a Kenyan spy thriller novel written in 1996 by Monica Genya about a secret operation to overthrow the current Kenyan government.

== Plot ==
The main character is a woman named Susan Juma who is currently the best secret agent at the Bureau of Investigative Operations, the Kenyan spy organization. B.I.O. employs highly trained operatives who secretly infiltrate the Kenyan government to keep the county safe. There have been a series of murders of government officials, so Susan and her boss/mentor at the B.I.O., Jackson Mwatata discuss the possible motives for the killing spree. Susan and Mwatata learn of a plot to overthrow the current government from an informant. This scheme was formulated by a mastermind who calls himself King Arthur, and his group of powerful followers the Knights of the Round Table. Their plan is to kill the Vice President of Kenya, which would destabilize the country so they can seize power.

Shortly after the agents learn of this plot, Mwatata is killed, and Susan suspects B.I.O had been infiltrated by members of the Round Table. With no one else to turn to, Susan decides to contact Chain, an infamous retired field agent who is effective but aloof. The two hatch a plan to foil the Knights of the Round Table’s plot, but must get rid of the secret society themselves since they can only trust the other.

== Style ==
This spy novel is written in third person omniscient, and Genya’s writing focuses on telling the audience about detailed actions and elaborate backstories. Reviewer for World Literature Today James Gibbs writes on the novel’s perception or reality: “The author is more interested in action than character or community. As in other examples of the convention, there is, for example, little attempt to show the repercussions of violence on the wider community, and agents undertake casually dangerous assignments with inadequate backup. There is almost no attempt to explore the impact of brutal killings and scenes of carnage on the perpetrators and witnesses. The youthful supersleuth moves away from scene after scene of carnage with little more than a gulp.
