= Kamacharia =

Kamacharia is a small Kikuyu town in Murang'a County Central Kenya. The town gained its name from a clan "mbari ya macharia" after being known as Kiriithiru. Farming is the main economic activity, and Coffee growing is the principal economic activity. The area is also known for Macadamia nut farming, dairy farming, banana farming, and agroforestry. Administratively, Kamacharia is a division in the Mathioya Sub-county of Muranga County. Kamacharia is also a ward represented at the Murang'a County Assembly. Gathunya location has been hived from Kamacharia location.

== Sources ==
- The Epoch Times, July 4–10, 2007 page 4
