= Collaborative learning =

Situation in which two or more people learn or attempt to learn something together

Collaborative learning is a situation in which two or more people learn or attempt to learn something together. Unlike individual learning, people engaged in collaborative learning capitalize on one another's resources and skills (asking one another for information, evaluating one another's ideas, monitoring one another's work, etc.). More specifically, collaborative learning is based on the model that knowledge can be created within a population where members actively interact by sharing experiences and take on asymmetric roles. Put differently, collaborative learning refers to methodologies and environments in which learners engage in a common task where each individual depends on and is accountable to each other. These include both face-to-face conversations and computer discussions (online forums, chat rooms, etc.). Methods for examining collaborative learning processes include conversation analysis and statistical discourse analysis.

Thus, collaborative learning is commonly illustrated when groups of students work together to search for understanding, meaning, or solutions or to create an artifact or product of their learning. Furthermore, collaborative learning redefines the traditional student-teacher relationship in the classroom which results in controversy over whether this paradigm is more beneficial than harmful. Collaborative learning activities can include collaborative writing, group projects, joint problem solving, debates, study teams, and other activities. The approach is closely related to cooperative learning.

== Theoretical background ==
Collaborative learning is rooted in Lev Vygotsky's concept of learning called zone of proximal development. Typically there are tasks that learners can and cannot accomplish. Between these two areas is the zone of proximal development, which is a category of things that a learner can learn but with the help of guidance. The zone of proximal development gives guidance as to what set of skills a learner has that are in the process of maturation. In Vygotsky's definition of zone of proximal development, he highlighted the importance of learning through communication and interactions with others rather than just through independent work. This has made way for the ideas of group learning, one of which being collaborative learning.

Collaborative learning is very important in achieving critical thinking. According to Gokhale (1995), individuals are able to achieve higher levels of learning and retain more information when they work in a group rather than individually, this applies to both the facilitators of knowledge, the instructors, and the receivers of knowledge, the students. For example, Indigenous communities of the Americas illustrate that collaborative learning occurs because individual participation in learning occurs on a horizontal plane where children and adults are equal.

== Differences from cooperative learning ==
There has been a split regarding the differences between collaborative and cooperative learning. Some believe that collaborative learning is similar to, yet distinct from, cooperative learning. While both models use a division of labor, collaborative learning requires the mutual engagement of all participants and a coordinated effort to solve the problem whereas cooperative learning requires individuals to take responsibility for a specific section and then coordinate their respective parts together. Another proposed differentiation is that cooperative learning is typically used for children because it is used to understand the foundations of knowledge while collaborative learning applies to college and university students because it is used to teach non-foundations of learning. Another believed difference is that collaborative learning is a philosophy of interaction whereas cooperative learning is a structure of interaction.

However, many psychologists have defined cooperative learning and collaborative learning similarly. Both are group learning mechanisms for learners to obtain a set of skills or knowledge. Some notable psychologists that use this definition for both collaborative and cooperative learning are Johnson & Johnson, Slavin, Cooper and more.

== Classroom ==
Often, collaborative learning is used as an umbrella term for a variety of approaches in education that involve joint intellectual effort by students or students and teachers by engaging individuals in interdependent learning activities. Many have found this to be beneficial in helping students learn effectively and efficiently than if the students were to learn independently. Some positive results from collaborative learning activities are students are able to learn more material by engaging with one another and making sure everyone understands, students retain more information from thoughtful discussion, and students have a more positive attitude about learning and each other by working together.

Encouraging collaborative learning may also help improve the learning environment in higher education. Kenneth Bruffee performed a theoretical analysis on the state of higher education in America. Bruffee aimed to redefine collaborative learning in academia. Simply including more interdependent activities will help the students become more engaged and thoughtful learners, but teaching them that obtaining knowledge is a communal activity itself.

When compared to more traditional methods where students non-interactively receive information from a teacher, cooperative, problem-based learning demonstrated improvement of student engagement and retention of classroom material. Additionally, academic achievement and student retention within classrooms are increased. A meta-analysis comparing small-group work to individual work in K-12 and college classrooms also found that students working in small groups achieved significantly more than students working individually, and optimal groups for learning tended to be three- to four-member teams with lower-ability students working best in mixed groups and medium-ability students doing best in homogeneous groups. For higher-ability students, group ability levels made no difference. In more than 40 studies of elementary, middle, and high school English classrooms, discussion-based practices improved comprehension of the text and critical-thinking skills for students across ethnic and socioeconomic backgrounds. Even discussions lasting as briefly as ten minutes with three participants improved perceived understanding of key story events and characters. Improvement in students' understanding of course content has also been observed at universities.

== Workplace ==
The popularity of collaborative learning in the workplace has increased over the last decade. With the emergence of many new collaborative tools, as well as the cost benefit of being able to reinforce learning in workers and in trainees during collaborative training, many work environments are now looking toward methods that involve collaborating with older employees and giving trainees more of a hands-on approach. Most companies are transitioning from traditional training programs that include instructor-led training sessions or online guided tutorials. Collaborative learning is extremely helpful because it uses past experiences from prior employees to help new trainees get over different challenges.

There are many facets to collaboration in the workplace. It is critical to helping workers share information with each other and creating strategic planning documents that require multiple inputs. It also allows for forms of vertical integration to find effective ways to synchronize business operations with vendors without being forced to acquire additional businesses.

Many businesses still work on the traditional instructor and trainee model and as they transition from one model to another there are many issues that still need to be debugged in the conversation process:

- Need to understand actual interests and concerns regarding collaborating processes, activities and tools
- Reigning leaders and managers must better understand the collaborative tools and processes that can boost productivity
- Become better equipped to design, implement and evaluate collaborative learning environment

Web technologies have been accelerating learner-centered personalized learning environments. This helps knowledge be constructed and shared, instead of passed down by authorities and passively consumed or ignored. Technologies such as discussion threads, email or electronic bulletin boards work by sharing personal knowledge and ideas and do not let others refine individual ideas which is why collaborative tools are needed. The tools on Web 2.0 have been able to enhance collaborative learning because they allow individuals to work together to generate, discuss and evaluate evolving ideas and find like-minded people they can collaborate with effortlessly.

According to a collaborative learning study conducted by Lee & Bonk (2014), there are still many issues that are still being resolved when dealing with collaborative learning in a workplace. The goal was to examine corporate personnel, including learning managers and instructors, plus the tools that they use for collaboration. The researchers conducted an online survey to see what aspects of collaborative learning should be investigated, followed by an open discussion forum with 30 corporate personnel. The results showed that collaboration is becoming very necessary in workplaces and tools such as wikis are very commonly used. There is implication for a lot of future work, in order to have collaborative learning be highly effective in the workplace. Some of the unsolved problems they identified:

1. Cultural diversity, and accordingly a lack of awareness of cultural norms
2. Geographical distance and time zone differences
3. Member isolation in virtual teams
4. Generation gaps and age differences in the acceptance of collaboration tools
5. Lack of technology support for learners
6. Lack of learners' awareness about effective collaboration processes and strategies
7. Lack of learners' technological skills and knowledge about collaboration tools

It is crucial to consider the interactive processes among people, but the most critical point is the construction of new knowledge brought about through joint work.

== Technology ==
Technology has become an important factor in collaborative learning. Over the past ten years, the Internet has allowed for a shared space for groups to communicate. Virtual environments have been critical to allowing people to communicate long-distances but still feel like they are part of the group. Research has been conducted on how technology has helped increase the potential of collaborative learning.One study in particular conducted by Elizabeth Stacey looked at how technology affected the communication of postgraduate students studying a Master of Business Administration (MBA) using computer-mediated communication (CMC). Many of these students were able to still remotely learn even when they were not present on their university campus. The results of the study helped build an online learning environment model but since this research was conducted the Internet has grown extensively and thus new software is changing these means of communication.

There has been a development of new technology that support collaborative learning in higher education and the workplace. These tools allow for a strong more power and engaging learning environment. Chickering identified seven principles for good practice in undergraduate education developed by Chickering. Two of these principles are especially important in developing technology for collaboration.

1. "Good practice develops reciprocity and cooperation among students,"
2. Good practice uses active learning techniques.

Some examples of how technology is being increasingly integrated with technology are as follows:

Collaborative networked learning: according to Findley (1987) "Collaborative Networked Learning (CNL) is that learning which occurs via electronic dialogue between self-directed co-learners and learners and experts. Learners share a common purpose, depend upon each other and are accountable to each other for their success. CNL occurs in interactive groups in which participants actively communicate and negotiate learning with one another within a contextual framework which may be facilitated by an online coach, mentor or group leader.

Computer-supported collaborative learning (CSCL) is a relatively new educational paradigm within collaborative learning which uses technology in a learning environment to help mediate and support group interactions in a collaborative learning context. CSCL systems use technology to control and monitor interactions, to regulate tasks, rules, and roles, and to mediate the acquisition of new knowledge.

Collaborative learning using Wikipedia: Wikipedia is an example of how collaborative learning tools have been extremely beneficial in both the classroom and workplace setting. They are able to change based on how groups think and are able to form into a coherent idea based on the needs of the Wikipedia user.

Collaborative learning in virtual worlds by their nature provide an easy opportunity for collaborative learning. At first learning in virtual worlds was restricted to classroom meetings and lectures, similar to their counterparts in real life. Now collaborative learning is evolving as companies starting to take advantage of unique features offered by virtual world spaces - such as ability to record and map the flow of ideas, use 3D models, and virtual worlds mind mapping tools.

== Cultural variations ==
There also exists cultural variations in ways of collaborative learning. Research in this area has mainly focused on children in indigenous Mayan communities of the Americas or in San Pedro, Guatemala and European American middle-class communities.

Generally, researchers have found that children in indigenous Mayan communities such as San Pedro typically learn through keenly observing and actively contributing to the mature activities of their community. This type of learning is characterized by the learner's collaborative participation through multi-modal communication verbal and non-verbal and observations. They are highly engaged within their community through focused observation. Mayan parents believe that children learn best by observing and so an attentive child is seen as one who is trying to learn. It has also been found that these children are extremely competent and independent in self-maintenance at an early age and tend to receive little pressure from their parents.

Research has found that even when Indigenous Mayan children are in a classroom setting, the cultural orientation of indigenous learners shows that observation is a preferred strategy of learning. Thus children and adults in a classroom setting adopt cultural practice and organize learning collaboratively. This is in contrast to the European-American classroom model, which allocates control to teachers/adults allowing them to control classroom activities.

Within the European American middle-class communities, children typically do not learn through collaborative learning methods. In the classroom, these children generally learn by engaging in initiation-reply-evaluation sequences. This sequence starts with the teacher initiating an exchange, usually by asking a question. The student then replies, with the teacher evaluating the student's answer. This way of learning fits with European-American middle-class cultural goals of autonomy and independence that are dominant in parenting styles within European-American middle-class culture.

=== Examples from Indigenous communities in the Americas ===
Although learning happens in a variety of ways in indigenous communities, collaborative learning is one of the main methods used in indigenous learning styles instead of using European-American approaches to learning. These methods include learning in a horizontal plane where children and adults equally contribute to ideas and activities.

For example, Mayan people of San Pedro use collaboration in order to build upon one another's ideas and activities. Specifically, many learning practices focus on "role-switching." When learning a new task, people alternate between helpful observer and active participant. Mayan mothers do not act as teachers when completing a task with their children, but instead collaborate with children through play and other activities. People of this Mayan community use the shared endeavors method more than European-Americans who tend to use the transmit-and-test model more often. The shared endeavors model is when people go off of others ideas and learn from them, while the transmit-and-test model is what is used in most American schools when a teacher gives students information and then tests the students on the information. The shared endeavors model is a form of collaborative learning because everyone learns from one another and are able to hear and share others' ideas.

In Nocutzepo, Mexico, indigenous heritage families form collective units where it is generally agreed that children and youth engage in adult cooperative household or community economic practices such as food preparation, child care, participating in markets, agriculture, animal herding, and construction to name a few. During planting and harvesting season, entire families are out in the fields together where children usually pitch into the activity with smaller tasks alongside adults; however, are always observant when it comes to activities done by adults, such as driving a tractor or handling an axe. These children learn through imitation, observation, listening, pitching in, and doing activities in a social and cultural context. When children begin to participate in the daily family/community activities, they form a sense of belonging, especially when they collaborate with adults establishing a more mature integration with their family and community.

Indigenous people of the Americas utilize collaborative learning through their emphasis on role sharing and responsibility sharing within their communities. The Mayan community of San Pedro, Guatemala utilizes flexible leadership that allows children to have an active role in their learning. Children and adults work as cohesive groups when tackling new projects. Collaborative learning is prevalent in Indigenous communities due to the integration of children in the daily lives of the adults. Age is not a determining factor in whether or not individuals are incorporated into collaborative efforts and learning that occurs in indigenous communities.

Participation of learner is a key component to collaborative learning as it functions as the method by which the learning process occurs. Thus collaborative learning occurs when children and adults in communities switch between "knowledge performers" and "observing helpers". For example, when parents in an indigenous Mazahua community where assigned the task of organizing children to build a roof over a market stand in such a way that they would learn to do it themselves, parents and children both collaborated on a horizontal structure. Switching between knowledge performer and observing helper, adults and children completed the task peacefully, without assigned roles of educator/student and illustrated that children still took initiative even when adults were still performing.

Adults and children in indigenous communities of the Americas participate in a horizontal organizational structure; therefore when they work together with one another they are reciprocals of each other. This horizontal structure allows for flexible leadership, which is one of the key aspects of collaborative learning. The indigenous communities of the Americas are unique in their collaborative learning because they do not discriminate upon age, instead Indigenous communities of the Americas encourage active participation and flexible leadership roles, regardless of age. Children and adults regularly interchange their roles within their community, which contributes to the fluidity of the learning process. In addition, Indigenous communities consider observation to be a part of the collaborative learning process.

Collaborative learning can also be incorporated into university settings. For example, the Intercultural Maya University of Quintana Roo, Mexico, has a system that incorporates elders, such as grandparents to act as tutors and as a resource for students to discuss information and knowledge regarding their own language and culture. The elders give their recommendation at the end of a semester in the decision of passing or failing a student, based on his/her behavior in the community and how well he/she is learning Maya. The system is called IKNAL, a mayan word that implies companionship in the learning and doing process that involves several members of the community.

=== Examples from around the world ===
Collaborative learning varies across the world. The traditional model for learning is instructor based but that model is quickly changing on a global standpoint as countries fight to be at the top of the economy. A country's history, culture, religious beliefs and politics are all aspects of their national identity and these characteristics influence on citizen's view of collaboration in both a classroom and workplace setting.

==== Japan ====
While the empirical research in Japan is still relatively sparse, many language educators have taken advantage of Japan's natural collectivism and experimented with collaborative learning programs More recently, technological advancements and their high adoption rate among students in Japan have made computer supported collaborative learning accessible. Japanese student's value for friendship and their natural inclination towards reciprocity seems to support collaborative learning in Japan.

== Examples ==
- Collaborative learning development enables developers of learning systems to work as a network. Specifically relevant to e-learning where developers can share and build knowledge into courses in a collaborative environment at a quick pace and typically lower cost. Knowledge of a single subject can be pulled together from remote locations using software systems.
- Collaborative learning in thesis circles in higher education is another example of people learning together. In a thesis circle, a number of students work together with at least one professor or lecturer, to collaboratively coach and supervise individual work on final (e.g. undergraduate or MSc) projects. Students switch frequently between their role as co-supervisor of other students and their own thesis work (incl. receiving feedback from other students).
- Collaborative learning in a composition classroom can unite students when assigned open-tasks. Kenneth Bruffee introduced the learning method, Classroom Consensus Group, in which the instructor allocates groups of three to five (three being ideal) students and assigns a problem to be solved or question to be answered. There are two directions the nonfoundational task can be presented: as an indistinct, no right answer that generates discussion or propose an answer and request questions and a process of how the answer came to be. Once the task is assigned, the instructor backs off in order to resist the urge to intervene in students' conversation. The goal is to remove focus of the instructor's authority. The instructor must keep time to ensure the students are centered on analogizing, generalizing, and bridging their comprehension with others. Following group discussion, the instructor is to evaluate, not judge, the students' work. Ideas should be presented to the entire class thus allowing the small groups to come together as a whole. It is then that the answers can be compared, gaps can be filled, and authority is not on one individual.
- Collaborative scripts structure collaborative learning by creating roles and mediating interactions while allowing for flexibility in dialogue and activities. Collaborative scripts are used in nearly all cases of collaborative learning some of which are more suited for face-to-face collaborative learning—usually, more flexible—and others for computer-supported collaborative learning—typically, more constraining. Additionally, there are two broad types of scripts: macro-scripts and micro-scripts. Macro-scripts aim at creating situations within which desired interactions will occur. Micro-scripts emphasize activities of individual learners.

Collaborative learning is also employed in the business and government sectors. For example, within the federal government of the United States, the United States Agency for International Development (USAID) is employing a collaborative project management approach that focuses on collaborating, learning and adapting (CLA). CLA involves three concepts:

- Adapting strategically based on applied learning.
- Collaborating intentionally with stakeholders to share knowledge and reduce duplication of effort,
- Learning systematically by drawing on evidence from a variety of sources and taking time to reflect on implementation.

== See also ==
- Collaborative information seeking
- Educational psychology
- Intergenerational equity
- Learning agenda
- Learning by teaching (LdL)
- Learning circle
- Learning community
- Numbers heads together
- Organizational learning
- Teaching for social justice
- Youth/adult partnerships
