= Writing center =

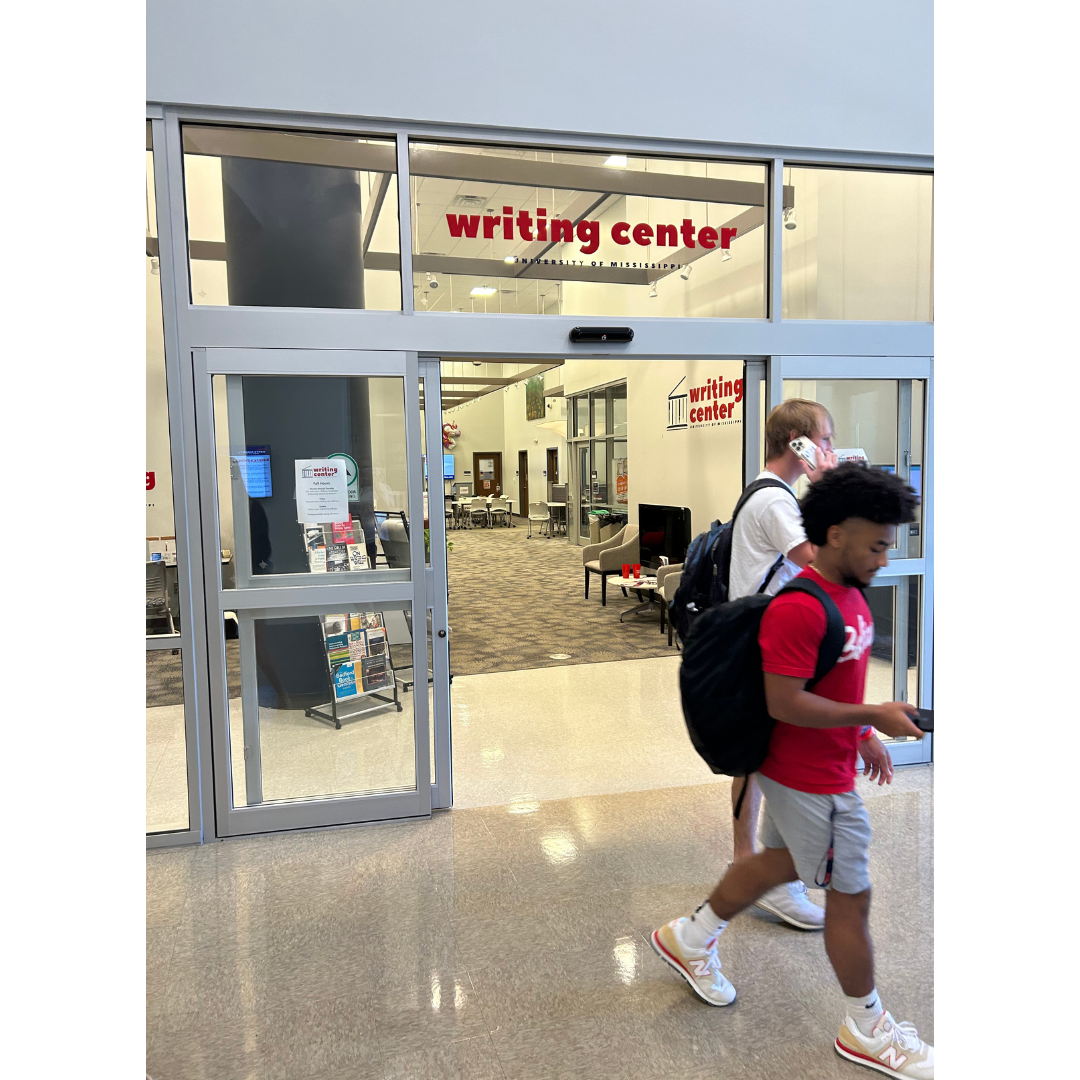
A writing center at the University of Mississippi

Writing centers provide students with assistance on their papers, projects, reports, multi-modal documents, web pages, and other writer needs across disciplines. Although writing center staff are often referred to as tutors, writing centers are primarily places for collaboration in which writers and tutors work together to help writers achieve their goals. Typical services include help with the purpose, structure, function of writing, and are geared toward writers of various levels and fields of study. The goal is to help a writer learn to address the various exigences that they may encounter with the realization that no writing is decontextualized—it always addresses a specific audience. Writing centers may offer one-on-one scheduled tutoring appointments, group tutoring, and writing workshops. Services may also include drop-in hours. Writing tutors do not assign grades to students' writing assignments.

== Overview ==
A writing center usually offers individualized conferencing whereby the writing tutor offers his or her feedback on the piece of writing at hand; a writing tutor's main function is to discuss how the piece of writing might be revised. Writing centers generally rely on non-prescriptive and non-corrective approaches to construct a more complete account of how well a piece of writing aligns with the writer's aims. In other words, a tutor usually does not proofread nor edit a student's work. Instead, the tutor facilitates the student's attempts to revise his or her own work by conversing with the student about the topic at hand, discussing principles and processes of writing, modeling rhetorical and syntactical moves for the student to apply, and assisting the student in identifying patterns of grammatical error in his or her writing. In other words, "[the job of writing tutors] is to produce better writers, not better writing."

== Writing centers at higher education institutions ==
=== History ===
Historically, writing centers in American universities began appearing as "writing labs" in the early 20th century. Elizabeth Boquet and Stephen North point to the origins of the writing laboratory as first a method, not a place, where "the key characteristic of which appears to have been that all work was to be done during class time". This was to allow the student to compose with the teacher present, able to help with any revisions or questions the student may have. However, as class sizes and universities grew, Writing Centers began to develop as university institutions, often conceived of as an editing service for students. As post-secondary institutions began accepting more and more students, CUNY schools adopted amongst the most open of open admissions policies. In response to insufficient faculty availability to meet students' needs, Kenneth Bruffee and colleagues innovated peer tutoring in writing centers. This remedy successfully provided help to students who were struggling with writing at the college level while also benefitting the tutors' writing and academic performances and providing training and employment opportunities to these students, who were more affordable to hire than Faculty members. These peer tutoring practices were based in collaborative learning principles and Bruffee's theorizing therein about the nature of knowledge construction through the act of conversation.

=== Location of writing centers ===
Writing centers may be centrally located at higher education institutions. Centers may be located within a student success center, which may offer other academic support services to students such as study skills appointments and workshops. These might typically be called Academic Skills Units or Learning Development Groups. Some writing centers may be part of a writing studies department or stand-alone.

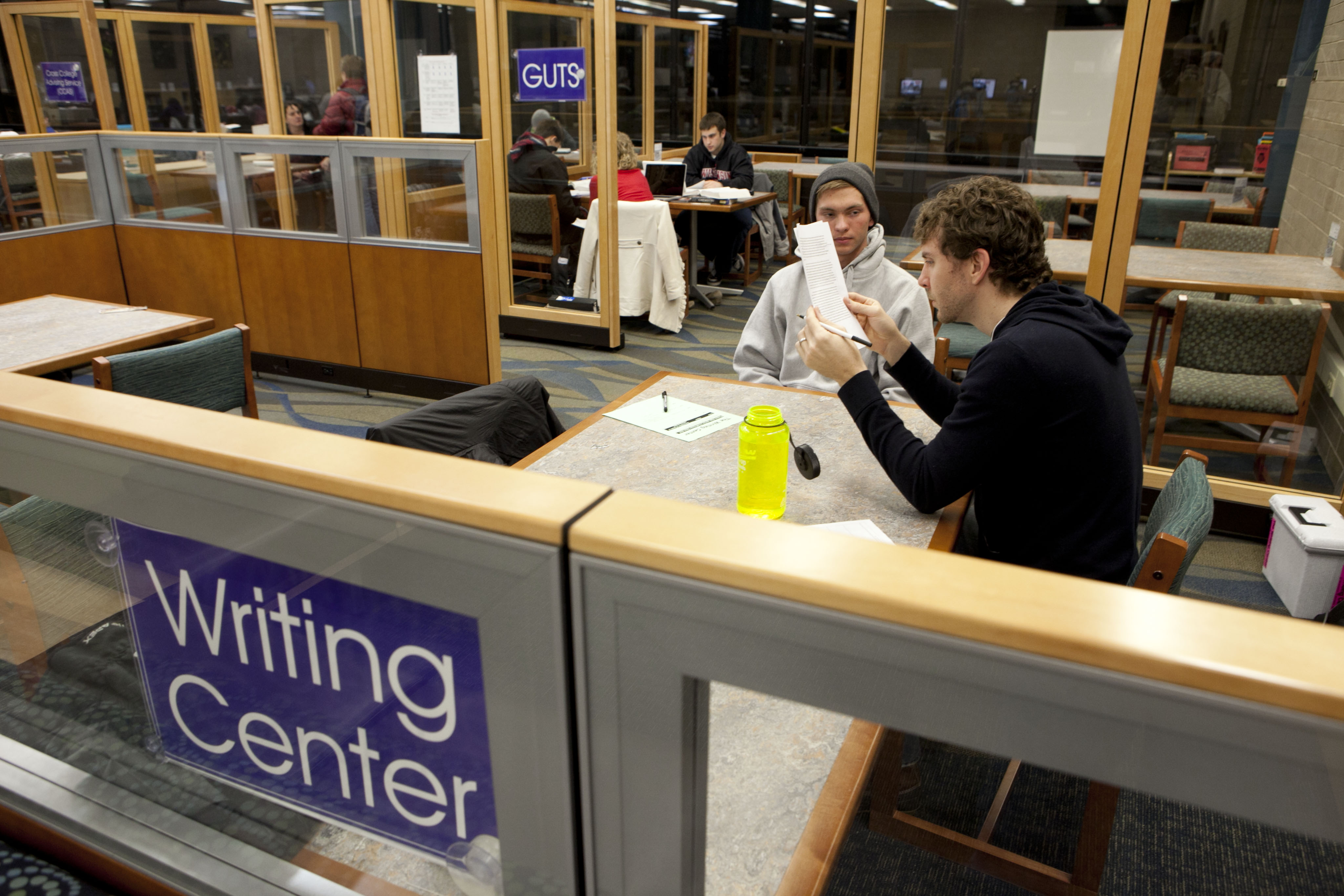
An example writing center

Some institutions also offer an Online Writing Lab (OWL), which generally attempts to follow the model of writing center tutoring in an online environment. These environments have been said to be a step toward a new model of writing centers, a model known as Multiliteracy Centers. Another environment that could fall under this category is a physical space known as a digital studio.

=== Writing consultants ===
Depending on the writing center and the target population, consultants may be undergraduate peer consultants, graduate consultants, graduate peer consultants, staff consultants, or faculty consultants. The consultants may be working for pay or for college credit. If the writing center offers workshop or group tutoring sessions, staff, experienced undergraduates, or graduates may serve in an unofficial or official teaching assistant capacity. Writing center research has examined what effect each type of consultant has upon the writer seeking help.

In many cases, writing center directors or writing program administrators (WPAs) are responsible for conducting writing center assessment, and must communicate these results to academic administration and various stakeholders. Assessment is seen as beneficial for writing centers because it creates a professional and ethical environment that is important not just for writing centers but for all higher education.

== Types of writers served ==
Writers served by these writing centers may vary depending on the setting. Post-secondary writing centers may serve undergraduate and graduate students in the same or separate facilities; others may be more inclusive, serving students, faculty, staff, GED students, and the general public. High school writing centers service enrolled students only.

=== English-language learners ===
Writing centers may serve English-language learners from across academic disciplines who are undergraduate or graduate students at the institution. English-language learners receive one-on-one writing assistance with a tutor, who may be a peer or a writing specialist. The goal is to assist English-language learners with language acquisition and to help students feel more confident in their ability to write effectively in the English language. Writing centers may develop resources and handouts for English-language learners on academic vocabulary and grammatical conventions.

Some English Language Learners may access a writing center specifically for grammatical help and error revision from tutors. This may conflict with the philosophy of a writing center to help students become better writers through discussing the overall flow and organization of the paper, rather than focusing on sentence-level revisions. Student tutors are generally taught not to edit papers during a session. Instead they are taught to collaborate on higher-level issues in their peer's paper. Much research has been done on if student tutors should take a more directive approach to teaching writing to English language learners. Ultimately student tutors must receive training on how to effectively teach English as a second language at writing centers so that sessions are effective and meaningful for both English language learners and tutors.

== Writing center theory ==
Faculty, students, staff, and administrators often viewed writing centers as places for remediation. At their best, however, they are places where all students, including the best ones, can get better, a place (according to Karen Head), "that returns to the ideal of a safe space for active debate and discourse about the best ways to communicate in a variety of modes." Collaboration in theory and practice is one particular idea of a writing center, although creating collaborative environment is really difficult. Collaboration allows tutors to involve students in a dialogue which helps to get in touch with their knowledge and find their unique voices. Collaborative environment rejects any kinds of hierarchies in the writing centers, thus allowing to negotiate and set common goals. Writing center is an institutional response to the writers' needs to have a good listener and editor, someone who knows how to write and can ask questions about the writing which writers would not ask themselves.

== Variations ==
No longer strictly an American phenomenon, writing centers have spread in other world regions as well. The European Association for the Teaching of Academic Writing (EATAW) is in part concerned with the study and advancement of writing centers in European universities. The International Writing Centers Association offers support for writing centers from around the world, with current regional associations in Europe and proposed associations in the Middle East, South Africa, and the Far East.

Writing centers are not exclusively a post-secondary phenomenon. Some high schools have successfully created writing centers similar to the model in higher education. Some writing centers provide services for the non-academic community, such as peer-tutoring for out-of-school writers and workshops on a wide variety of topics. Some even have sites off-campus entirely, where they are sometimes identified as community writing centers.

Writing centers are now being used in the business world. Notably, the Philadelphia Federal Reserve added a writing center.

== See also ==
- Communication studies
- Composition studies
- Rhetoric
- Student affairs
- Writing center assessment
