= Digital studio =

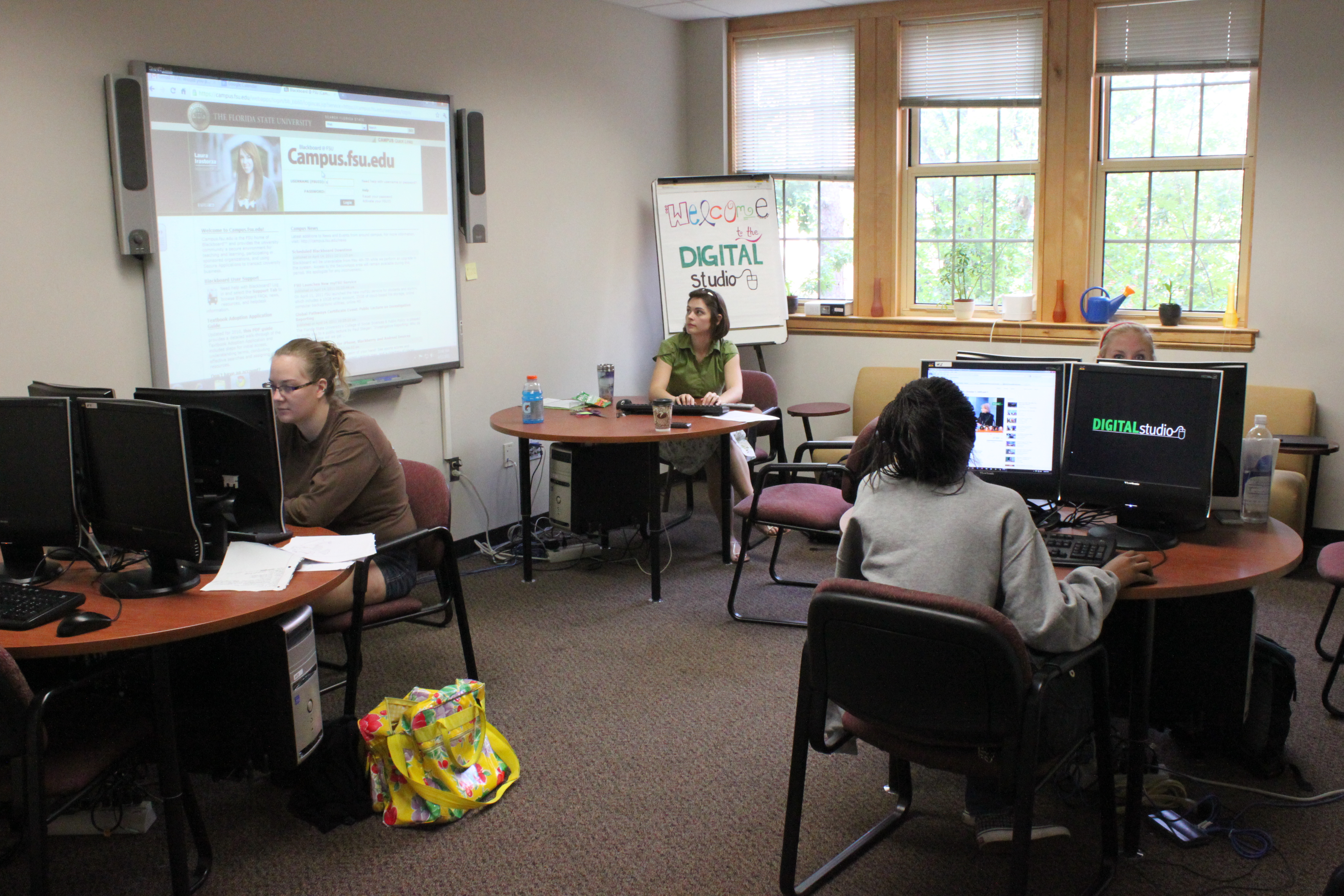
Students working at a Digital Studio

A digital studio provides both a technology-equipped space and technological/rhetorical support to students (commonly at a university) working individually or in groups on a variety of digital projects, such as designing a website, developing an electronic portfolio for a class, creating a blog, making edits, selecting images for a visual essay, or writing a script for a podcast.

== History/theory ==
=== Overview ===
Digital Studios are places with different names but similar objectives. They have risen in response to the need for resources dedicated to improving students' interactions with digital technologies for rhetorical ends. Digital Studios have often been theoretically and administratively linked to writing centers, which are sites where students can seek assistance with their text-based projects. The academic term that has been used for this kind of site (i.e. a writing center with a focus on digital and new media) is multiliteracy center. Besides having a multimodal focus, Digital Studios also make a departure from writing center model in allowing students the freedom to work in the Studio without one-on-one interaction with a writing tutor.

=== The rise of technology ===
==== Computer literacy in popular culture ====
As early as 1983, computer literacy was being hailed in The New York Times as the "new goal in schools." As computer technology became more ubiquitous, and the World Wide Web became more popular and accessible, and as the teaching of computer skills became official US policy with the enactment of the "Technology Literacy Challenge" by the Clinton Administration in 1996, educators across disciplines began to investigate with renewed vigor the role of computer technology in curriculum as both a means and an end.

==== Scholarly interest in 'multiliteracies' ====
The same year that President Clinton initiated the "Technology Literacy Challenge", the New London Group (NLG) issued a call for scholars of literacy pedagogy to account for the burgeoning variety of text forms associated with information and multimedia technologies. This includes understanding and competent control of representational forms that are becoming increasingly significant in the overall communications environment, such as visual images and their relationship to the written word – for instance, visual design in desktop publishing or the interface of visual and linguistic meaning in multimedia. This account for new text forms, combined with a similar account for "increasingly globalized societies," is called 'multiliteracies' by the NLG.

==== Technological literacy in rhetoric and composition ====
Two years later, during the 1998 CCCC Chair's Address, Cynthia Selfe (who founded the peer-reviewed journal Computers and Composition in 1983) addressed professionals in the field of Rhetoric and Composition with an objective similar to that of the NLG, arguing that as a field, composition scholars had "paid technology issues precious little focused attention over the years." She called this lack of attention "dangerously shortsighted." What was needed, Selfe claimed, was for teachers to "pay attention" to "how technology is now inextricably linked with literacy and literacy education in this country." In a way, Selfe's call marked the beginning of a new scholarly interest in what Selfe called "critical technological literacy":

Composition teachers, language arts teachers, and other literacy specialists need to recognize that the relevance of technology in the English studies disciplines is not simply a matter of helping students work effectively with communication software and hardware, but, rather, also a matter of helping them to understand and to be able to assess – to pay attention to – the social, economic, and pedagogical implications of new communication technologies and technological initiatives that affect their lives.

Scholars who took up this call included Barbara Blakely Duffelmeyer, who conducted studies involving the incorporation of "critical computer literacy" (an adaptation of Selfe's term) into first-year composition.

==== Communications across media, inside and outside school ====
The years following Selfe's address saw more rapid advancements in mobile technologies, social media, and Web 2.0, creating even more new venues of composing for teachers to pay attention to. In her own CCCC Chair's Address in 2004, Kathleen Blake Yancey cited these new venues in her argument as a "new curriculum for the 21st century," one that would bring "together the writing outside of school and that of inside." Such a curriculum, she said:

is located in a new vocabulary, a new set of practices, and a new set of outcomes; it will focus our research in new and provocative ways; it has as its goal the creation of thoughtful, informed, technologically adept writing publics.

A professor at Clemson at the time of her speech, Yancey also argued for the creation of an undergraduate major in composition and rhetoric. She soon moved to Florida State University, where she helped to establish a new major in line with the one she argued for at CCCC called Editing, Writing, and Media (EWM).

As teachers and administrators across the country looked to incorporate more digital technology into their curriculum, the need for spaces for digital composition and for support with the innumerable digital composing platforms became apparent. A Digital Studio is one such space.

=== Link with writing centers ===
With the need for support for students who would engage with digital writing and multimedia projects, professionals involved with work in writing centers began to draw comparisons between their traditional work — assisting students with alphabetic texts on the page — and a new kind of work: assisting students with their multimedia projects on the screen. John Trimbur predicted in 2000:

My guess is that writing centers will more and more define themselves as multiliteracy centers. Many are already doing so – tutoring oral presentations, adding online tutorials, offering workshops in evaluating web sources, and being more conscious of document design. To my mind, new digital literacies will increasingly be incorporated into writing centers not just as sources of information or delivery systems for tutoring but as productive arts in their own right, and writing center work will, if anything, become more rhetorical in paying attention to the practices and effects of design in written and visual communication — more product-oriented and perhaps less like the composing conferences of the process movement.

Later, just months before Yancey delivered her CCCC Chair's Address, Michael Pemberton, writing in the Writing Center Journal, asked:

As we enter an era when electronic publishing and computer-mediated discourse are the norm, an era when new literary genres and new forms of communication emerge on, seemingly, a weekly basis, we must ask ourselves whether writing centers should continue to dwell exclusively in the linear, non-linked world of the printed page or whether they should plan to redefine themselves – and retrain themselves – to take residence in the emerging world of multimedia, hyperlinked, digital documents. To put it plainly, should we be preparing tutors to conference with students about hypertexts?

Pemberton also surveyed (by his account) the forty-year history of how "writing centers [have] viewed new technologies," observing that "the relationship between writing centers and computer technology has been, overall, only a cordial one." Pemberton's article is evidence of the continuing discussion among writing center professionals about the need for support for students' digital creations, support which they saw as analogous to work in writing centers.

In 2010, a collection edited by David Sheridan and James Inman, Multiliteracy Centers: Writing Center Work, New Media, and Multimodal Rhetoric, was published. Many of the chapters therein cite the above Trimbur and Pemberton quotes as they work to explain the exigence for the collection, the instances in which multiliteracy centers have been established (the founding of the Clemson Class of 1941 Studio for Student Communication is the subject of two chapters), and both theoretical and practical analyses of potential futures of such work.

=== 'Studio' vs. 'Center:' A break from the model ===
The conflation of digital studios and writing centers into multiliteracy centers is helpful in some respects, for example, administratively the two may be managed in similar ways and staffed by the same people. In other respects, it has been said that it is better to separate them into two distinct kinds of facilities. The very choice of naming a "writing center" or "digital studio" by either (or another) title, for instance, ought (according to some) to be informed by what kinds of student-activities are expected to take place there.

A writing center is a place for individual students to seek help from individual writing tutors with print-based texts. A studio model creates opportunities for collaboration among students with or without tutor-involvement for many different kinds of projects in many different modes.
