= My Life in Crime =

1984 novel by John Kiriamiti

- Author: John Kiriamiti
- Language: English
- Series: My Life in Crime trilogy
- Genre: Crime fiction
- Publisher: Spear Books (Kenya)
- Publication date: 1984
- Publication place: Kenya
- Media type: Hardback
- Pages: 216
- ISBN: 9966-46-192-2
- Dewey Decimal: 364.092
- Followed by: My Life with a Criminal: Milly's Story

My Life in Crime is a 1984 novel by Kenyan author John Kiriamiti. It is a fictionalized account of Kiriamiti's criminality in Kenya during the 1960s and 1970s. The novel details Kiriamiti's crimes under the alias Jack Zollo that led to his imprisonment. It is the first novel in Kiriamiti's My Life... trilogy. In 2011, it was reported that the trilogy would adapted into a film, as of 2026, no further production updates have been reported in major Kenyan media.

== Background ==
John Kiriamiti was a real-life criminal in Kenya during the 1960's and 1970's in the wake of the country's independence. Kiriamiti evaded the Kenyan police for all the crimes he committed until he was arrested in November 1970 on the eve of his wedding. He was charged and imprisoned on January 6, 1971 on counts of robbery. My Life in Crime was written and published while Kiriamiti was in jail. He was released in 1984, five months after the novel's publication.

== Synopsis ==
Young John Kiriamiti is kicked out of secondary school and his family orders him to return to his rural hometown of Thuita. He does not stay for long though, eventually making his way back to Nairobi, where he becomes a pickpocket under the alias Jack Zollo.

Jack becomes involved in his first "big job" when asked by his friend Captain Ngugi to be an accomplice in robbing a white man. Jack walks away with six grand, but not without feeling guilty for his actions. While out to clear his head, Jack runs into his sister Connie, whom he has not seen since running away to Nairobi years ago. Connie invites Jack to her and her husband's house, where they watch the news and hear a report of the robbery in which Jack was involved. Jack becomes paranoid and leaves Connie's house.

Jack and Connie continue spending time together. One day when visiting his sister's home, their mother comes over, and she is overjoyed to see her son. She insists that he return with her for a visit home and that he share with the family part of the money he has been earning. He is broke, though, and resorts to another robbery so as to not disappoint his family. He makes away with 10,000 dollars and goes home with his mother. While out one day after returning to Nairobi, Jack picks up a lost student ID and becomes enamored with the girl pictured, Miriam Nyambui. Jack decides to visit the girls' school to return her ID. Jack spots Miriam and calls her over to give her the ID, then asks her to lunch. Miriam accepts the offer, and the two begin spending a lot of time together.

Jack becomes involved in another big robbery job, this time with his friend G.G.. The two spend a couple of days planning the heist and Jack becomes nervous because he knows he will have to use his gun for the first time. The robbery is successful but ends in a gun fight. Although Jack never talks about the job with anyone, word spreads and he becomes one of Nairobi's most wanted criminals. Jack stays around his apartment as much as possible, pulls a few small jobs here and there, and falls even more in love with Milly. Jack gets arrested for the first time and is taken to Central Police Station. He spends a few days in jail and plots to escape. Jack eventually makes bail under a false name and flees just as the police are realizing his escape. He returns home, where Milly asks that they finally marry, but Jack refuses, saying that he must instead flee the country for no less than six months. Milly agrees to the plan.

Jack gets everything in order then begins his get-away journey from Kenya. On his way out of town, Jack runs into his old friends Ndung'u and Njoroge, who join Jack on his trip out of the country. While on the road, police pull the men over for questioning, and the three are taken to the police. Jack, knowing that his fingerprints will incriminate him, decides to take a razor to his hands and peels off the skin. Jack is released and resumes his fleeing from Kenya and drives to Uganda, stopping for a few days every now and then. His final destination is Bukavu in the Democratic Republic of the Congo where he stays for two months.

Jack seeks a job in Congo and gets a job chauffeuring for a Greek millionaire, Stephano, and his family. He becomes close with the family and even entertains the idea of staying in Congo the rest of his life instead of returning to Kenya

In Congo, Jack finds himself in the middle of a love triangle and resolves to leave the country. When Jack boards the plane, he feels that he is in the clear and safely on his way to Uganda, but he is approached by the plane's captain and told he must get off at the next layover in Astrida, Rwanda. There, Jack is questioned and detained by the Rwandan police. Jack flees the airport and makes his way via cab and foot to the town center, where he offered help by a shop owner. Once he finally makes it to his home country, he returns home to find Milly is missing.

Jack is finally reunited with Milly, but notices that she acts differently toward him than before he left Kenya. Jack adjusts back to life in Nairobi and soon feels comfortable again. Jack learns that most of his old criminal friends are dead or in jail, which temporarily convinces him that he himself should no longer be a criminal. Jack soon, however, meets up with his long lost friend Captain and gets pulled into another job. The job does not go as planned and Jack returns home empty-handed. Jack takes a two-month break from jobs, but then becomes involved in another that he hopes will result in enough money that he can spoil Milly and retire from being a criminal.

He becomes involved in yet another job, this time robbing a bank in Naivasha. Unforeseen circumstances at the bank complicate doing the job as swiftly as Jack and his accomplices would like, but the group soon do the job and flee in the getaway car. They notice, though, that a European is following them. The group comes across an accident between a bus and a car, and does not have time to properly stop. The driver tries to circumvent the accident, but ends up rolling over multiple times. Civilians from the bus in the accident approach the car to help Jack and the others inside, but Jack fires warning shots and the civilians flee. Jack and Captain run in the same direction away from the scene of the accident. Jack spends a while on the run before finally making his way home to Milly. He lays low and decides to stop being a criminal.

Milly and Jack decide to finally marry, and the two make preparations for the ceremony, which is to take place in Thuita. On the way to Thuita, Jack becomes involved in a skirmish with the police, who successfully shoot and immobilize him. Jack is swiftly arrested and transported to the police car to take him to the station.

On the day he was to be wed to Milly, Jack spends the day in the Central Police Station being questioned and tortured. He is later tried and sentenced to twenty years in prison and forty-eight lashes of the cane. Jack is escorted to prison, where he writes his book and claims that he is a reformed man.

== Major characters ==
- John Kiriamiti a.k.a. Jack Zollo: narrator who becomes a criminal after getting expelled from secondary school
- Miriam "Milly" Nyambui: girl with whom Jack falls in love after finding her lost school ID
- Anne Wanjiru: Jack's mother, a teacher by profession
- Captain Ngugi: a friend of Jack's who talks Jack into his first big robbery
- Connie: Jack's sister; first relative to come into contact with him after he runs away from home to Nairobi
- Hirji: Indian hotel owner who gets Jack a job in Congo
- Stephano: Greek millionaire for whom Jack works in Congo
- Hellene: Greek millionaire's daughter with whom Jack falls in love
- Karamikos: Greek millionaire's son who welcomes Jack into the family as a brother
- Miss Elizabeth Makarios: Stephano's secretary with whom Jack has an affair

Themes in my life in crime

=== Morality ===
My Life in Crime grapples with the concept of morality, particularly in the form of characters like Jack Zollo who commit crimes in order to survive. Although Zollo blatantly commits crimes that go against what a legal system would deem "moral," he tends to be regarded as heroic by the reader and those around him in the narrative context. Kiriamiti renders his quasi-autobiographical character in My Life in Crime likable and sincere by writing the book as a first-person confessional in which he admits to his transgressions that led his reformation. Kiriamiti, through his fictionalized character, also directly addresses the reader, often as "you," "friend," and "brother." This highly personal writing style effectively maneuvers the reader into complicity with and understanding of Zollo's crimes, rather than harsh judgment.

=== Life in Postcolonial Nairobi ===
Kiriamiti situates a majority of the events in his narrative in postcolonial Nairobi, which, following Kenya's independence in 1963 from British rule, experienced an influx of native African inhabitants. Prior to independence, the British cast Kenyans during colonial times as the lowest social strata, relegated to living as laborers and minimum-wage workers in the poorest parts of Nairobi. It is in postcolonial Nairobi that Zollo gains notoriety as a criminal and joins a network of other criminals who consistently involve him in robberies. Thus, the city is, for Zollo, a place of opportunity where he and his fellow criminals make regular citizens fearful of being victims of crime.

=== Other ===
Other themes dealt with in My Life in Crime are:

- Postcolonial crime
- Justice
- Religion
- Redemption
- Classism
- Representation of Kenyan women
- Luck
- Truth vs. lies
- Role of news
- Guns and violence
- Anxiety and paranoia
- Fashion

== Critical response ==
My Life in Crime was a best-selling novel in Kenya in the 1980s and has been reprinted ten times. According to the East African Educational Publishers Book Catalogue, Kiriamiti is the most published Spear Books author. Despite My Life in Crime's popularity, some Kenyan school authorities did not allow students to read or possess the novel, forcing students to read it covertly for fear of being caught. My Life in Crime is cited as the first of many urban Kenyan "crime craze" books.

== Film adaptation ==
My Life in Crime is currently being made into a movie by director Neil Schell. The film will star famous Nigerian actor Jim Iyke as Jack; other actors include Ainea Ojiambo, Janet Kirina, Abubakar Mwenda, Melvin Alusa, Jeff Koinange, Lenana Kariba and Eddy Kimani. Kiriamiti himself may make a cameo in the film. Production for the movie will reportedly cost KSh35 million (US$412,000).
