= Feminist rhetoric =

Practice of rhetoric

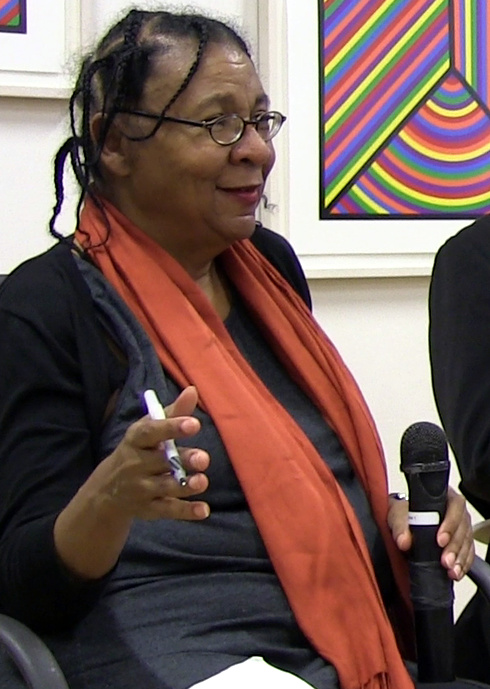
The writing of bell hooks has been influential for feminist rhetoric

Feminist rhetoric is a scholarly, multigenre, and multidisciplinary movement and strategy, and a field of study in the Humanities. It emphasizes the narratives of all demographics, including women and other marginalized groups, into the consideration or practice of rhetoric. Feminist rhetoric does not focus exclusively on the rhetoric of women or feminists but instead prioritizes the feminist principles of inclusivity, community, and equality over the classic, patriarchal model of persuasion that ultimately separates people from their own experience. Seen as the act of producing or the study of feminist discourses, feminist rhetoric emphasizes and supports the lived experiences and histories of all human beings in all manner of experiences. It also redefines traditional delivery sites to include non-traditional locations such as demonstrations, letter writing, and digital processes, and alternative practices such as rhetorical listening and productive silence. Rhetorical feminism is as a set of strategies that expand who can speak, who counts as audience, and how audiences can respond. These set of tactics aim to counter traditional forms of rhetoric, favoring dialogue over monologue and seeking to redefine the way audiences view rhetorical appeals.

== Definition and goals ==
As a group that had been silenced for 2500 years, feminist rhetors began to gain strength with the Second Wave feminism of the 1960s–1970s, particularly through the writing of bell hooks who used common language and personal experiences as the basis for critically examining academic, cultural, and social issues. Rhetorical feminism as an academic discipline began to significantly evolve by the mid-1980s when women in academia challenged the standards of Western rhetorical tradition with feminist ideology. Patricia Bizzell, Karlyn Kohrs Campbell, Lisa Ede, Cheryl Glenn, Shirley Wilson Logan, Andrea Lunsford, and Krista Ratcliffe were all early theorists of feminist rhetoric who made significant advances in the field.

In the mid-1990s, the traditional Aristotelian notion that rhetoric is fundamentally persuasive was questioned when feminist rhetors argued that persuasion reflects a patriarchal bias that simultaneously alienates people from their own experiences, cultures, and communicative practices and exerts power over them. An emphasis on understanding rather than persuasion underpins much of rhetorical feminism, engaging with, collaborating, and listening to the marginalized as equals. By redefining the "dehumanizing" definition of classical persuasive rhetoric, whereby one group's experiences are dominated and devalued by another, more persuasive group, feminist rhetoric seeks to equalize and honor the experiences of all living beings.

Because rhetoric is a cultural artifact reflecting the social values of the society that creates it, the absence of women and other marginalized groups reveals the patriarchal silencing of women's experiences; furthermore, the devaluation of women's traditional depiction and experiences (emotional/passive) contrasts the elevation of men's depiction and experiences (rational/active). Scholars of feminist rhetoric add the stories of women into the history of rhetoric who have been previously overlooked or relegated to second-class status, combine issues in feminism and rhetorical theory, and produce rhetorical criticism from feminist perspectives with the ultimate goal of elevating historically marginalized voices. Feminist rhetorical scholars challenge and redefine the dominant patriarchal narrative, particularly Platonic and Aristotelian classifications and definitions.

Rhetorical feminism aims to cultivate an understanding rather than try to persuade, in turn creating a space for marginalized and minority groups to feel comfortable enough to vocalize various social concerns. Cheryl Glenn, the author of "The Language of rhetorical feminism, anchored in hope" (2020), highlights how President Trump built his campaign around spreading divisive and harmful rhetoric, which unjustly targets the rights of marginalized communities, including Women, Black people, Mexicans, Muslims, Middle eastern, and Chinese individuals. Glenn further explains that rhetorical feminism promotes a more democratic process. This sort of democratic process would allow people to walk through life in a way that closely aligns with their beliefs, question and protest against unjust systems, scrutinize various issues and explore reinvention within oneself as engaged citizens. Glenn describes rhetoric as a tool that can be used to combat divisive argumentative dialogue, thus, replacing hostility with compassion, empathy and awareness. As Glenn explains, rhetoric can be utilized in persuasive and dehumanizing ways rather than be used in more feminist approach which focuses on honoring strength grounded in hope, mutual understanding, and collaboration.

In addition, Glenn also explains that rhetoric is not objective, as many claim it to be. Communicate is shaped by certain powers individuals hold, for example their social hierarchy, their privilege, and the social norms they follow. Rhetoric has always been shaped by the voices of powerful white males who are in respected professions like politics, and business and they have shaped what rhetoric is by naturally being in these positions of power. When we observe women and other minority groups in the same field, they do not receive the same response and attention as their white male counterparts because they are judged for how different their rhetoric is and are often ignored and dismissed. Women tend to be softer and heartfelt while men tend to blunt.

== History ==
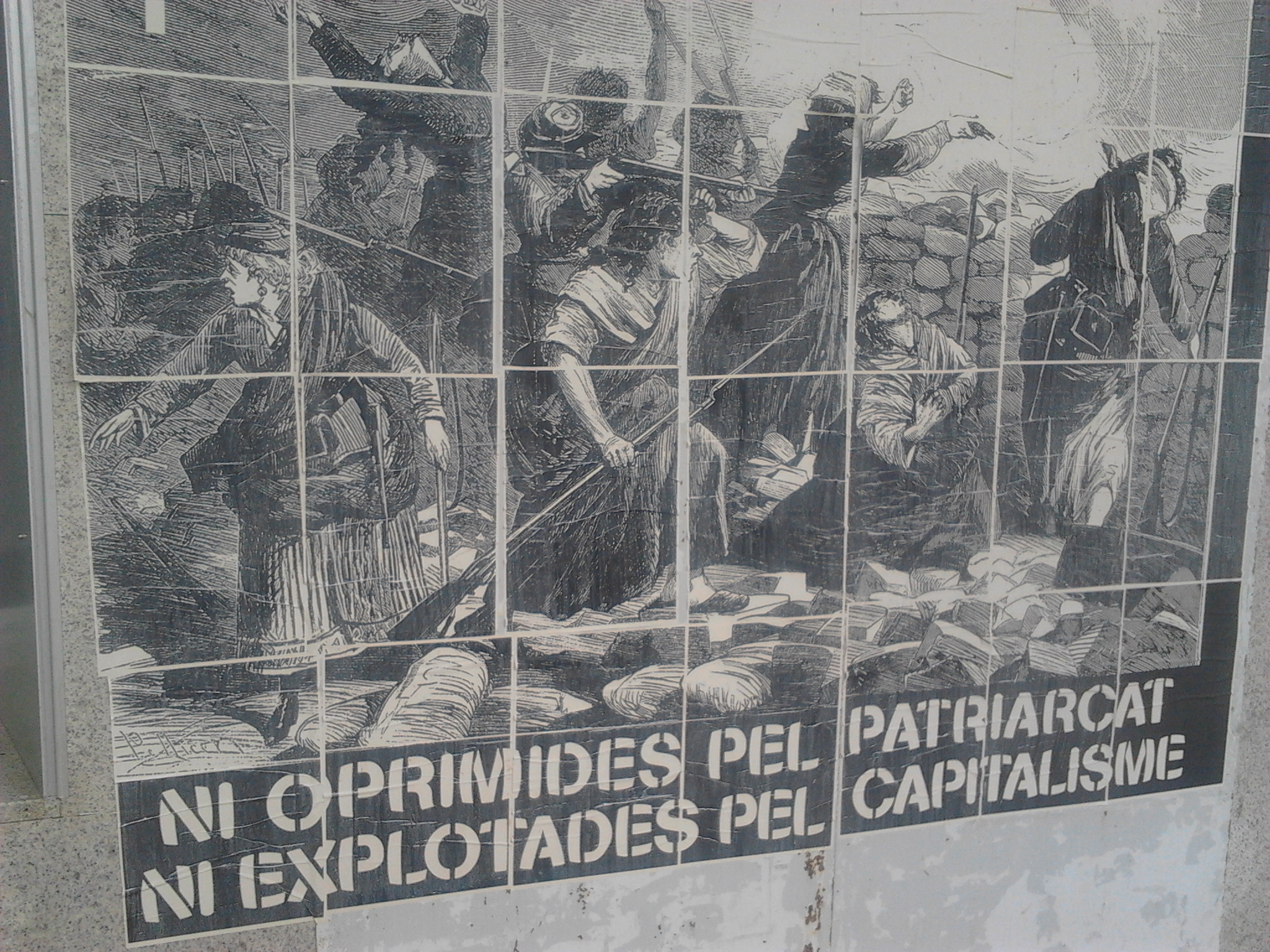
An example of visual feminist rhetoric: wallpaper (poster) protesting patriarchy and capitalism on the campus of Pompeu Fabra University in Barcelona, Spain.

In 1973, feminist scholar Karlyn Kohrs Campbell wrote an influential essay, The Rhetoric of Women's Liberation: An Oxymoron, that drew feminists' attention to women's roles as communicators within rhetorical frameworks and to the relevance of feminist theory to the study of rhetoric. Feminist scholar Patricia Bizzell noted in 1992 that the classical canon of rhetoric consists almost entirely of well-educated male authors. In addition, scholars of feminist rhetoric argued that the field itself was suffused with patriarchal values. To address this perceived problem, they made efforts to include women authors in the history of rhetoric, established connections between feminist issues and theories of rhetoric, and wrote rhetorical criticism from feminist perspectives. While these academics were initially inspired by feminist scholarship outside of rhetoric and composition studies, they eventually developed a distinctive school within this tradition.

Following the initial feminist rhetoric movement, the Coalition of Women (later Feminist) Scholars in the History of Rhetoric and Composition was formed in 1988. According to its mission statement, this coalition "fosters inquiry in the histories, theories, and pedagogues of rhetoric and composition" for the "advancement of feminist research". It is composed of teachers and scholars dedicated to promoting the intersectionality of communication and collaboration within feminist rhetoric and research methods. Founding members included Winifred Horner, Jan Swearingen, Nan Johnson, Marjorie Curry Woods, and Kathleen Welch. Contemporary leading scholars include Andrea Lunsford, Jacqueline Jones Royster, Cheryl Glenn, and Shirley Wilson Logan. 1996 brought the publication of Peitho, the coalition's newspaper, published by Susan Jarratt. In present-day feminist rhetoric, a point of emphasis is changing research methods and methodologies to include the discourse of "marginalized Others" such as African American, Chicanx, and Muslim women.

Feminist rhetoric works to expand the rhetorical canon introduced by the Roman orator Cicero in his treatise De Inventione (ca. 50 BCE) and the first century CE Roman rhetorician Quintilian in Institutio Oratoria. The classical rhetorical canon has been the foundation of rhetorical education since its creation. Feminist rhetoric scholars argue that this patriarchal canon and its methods of persuasion exclude valuable forms of public discourse and narrative, and they seek to redefine it accordingly.

== Themes ==
=== Methodology in rhetoric studies ===
Scholars such as Jessica Enoch and Jaqueline Jones Royster introduced the idea of changing the way research is recognized and constructed. Scholars in rhetoric studies agree there is a plethora of voices and demographics to draw upon for data necessary for research in the field. Researchers suggest this is achieved by asking questions that have never been asked before, recognizing the wealth of materials (or lack thereof) in archives, and expanding the idea of an archive. Rhetorical feminist methodologies avoid reading past texts as reflectons of one's own ideas and instead seek to understand them in their original context, paying attention to how publishing choices and practices shape credibility and authority of women's writing. In recent years, archives have been deconstructed, or critically analyzed, outside of scholarly articles.

Feminist rhetorical academics work to develop research methods and methodologies by including new types of archival research such as yearbooks, small-town newspapers, and community-contributing archival websites. To add, some scholars have gone as far as reintroducing the concept of ethos as it pertains to women leading public discourse. Scholars have argued women who are not white, middle class, and heterosexual are challenged in establishing credibility as it pertains to the Aristotelian ethos. Furthermore, scholars offer the concept of feminist ecological ēthe. This concept moves away from the traditional rhetorical device, ethos. This proposed concept identifies women's ethos as new ways to adopt interrelationality, materiality, and agency.

The research article, published by Cheryl Glenn, titled: "The Language of Rhetorical Feminism, Anchored in Hope," provides insight into the study and usage of feminist rhetoric. Focusing mainly on "...the necessity of hope to the democratic ideal, where everyone has a voice –and uses it rhetorically. Second, I will explain the tactic I call "rhetorical feminism," which is anchored in hope; and, finally, I will meditate on hope and the possibilities of rhetorical feminism for us all."

Glenn argues that while women have legal equality, it does not translate to social equality. That is, even though women have gained suffrage, their voices still are not always heard. She claims that other rhetoricians are employing rhetorical feminism when they deliver messages that promote inclusivity, human rights and social justice, and mutual understanding. She defines rhetorical feminism as "a set of tactics that multiplies rhetorical opportunities in terms of who counts as a rhetor, who can inhabit an audience, and what those audiences can do." Glenn writes that when implemented, rhetorical feminism is inclusive, representative, and democratic. She also states that rhetorical feminism's key distinguishing feature is that it is "anchored in hope," meaning that rhetorical feminists take into account evidence that does not look good and use their hope to look beyond the facts in order to create new possibilities.

Other methodologies that have been closely studied in women's rhetoric are "writing women in" to rhetorical canons approach the "challenging rhetorical challenges" approach. The feminist methodology "writing women in" is an approach that focuses on including women in narratives that have been left out of previous contributions to feminist rhetoric. It is a call for historians to make women's stories a centric focus who have been excluded or simply looked over. Additionally, intersectional feminist methods can be applied throughout the history of research and writing. However, some scholars argue both approaches have limitations.

=== Global narratives ===
Feminist rhetoric studies persuasive communication that focuses on the social, political, cultural, and economic inequalities of genders; it also seeks to explain complex issues in women's writing and, in some approaches, connecting feminists ideas across contexts. Specifically, transnational feminists such as Chandra Talpade Mohanty have addressed "how women's lives are shaped by national boundaries and histories of colonialism." Feminist rhetorical scholars ask questions of how rhetoric, writing studies, and social change intersect, or may be influenced by politics, the economy, religions, cultures, and education. A key term used in this field is "transnationality," defined as the culture of one nation moving through borders to another nation. It is used with the terms cultural hybridity and intertextuality, which continue the theory of cultures, texts, and ideas mixing with one another. In rhetorical feminist Cheryl Glenn's article, The Language of Rhetorical Feminism, Anchored in Hope, Glenn discusses how rhetoric has expanded to be more inclusive, and how democratic power lies in challenging systems that are not just, engaging citizens of global communities, and expanding accessibility. In doing so, we allow more people, including those who have been marginalized, to be involved in the democratic process which makes for a system that is more just.

Women entering the political space have grown in recent years and they have left quite an impact in what has been known as a male- dominated arena for some time. Rebecca S. Richards provided a body of work titled "Transnational Feminist Rhetorics and Gendered Leadership in Global Politics : From Daughters of Destiny to Iron Ladies," which provides a framework for transnational feminist rhetoric by examining women world leaders in the political realm. Richard urges female rhetoricians to look beyond the patterns of representation, but rather consider how those patterns of representation have material effects. Considering the effects, affect elected policy makers, policies, and projects by political leaders. Richard argues this approach is critical to scholarship on transnational feminism. As it directly impacts political leaders and their policies that relate to cross-national contexts and drive local and global economic policies. Throughout her text she examines the rhetoric of dominant female world leaders, those leaders include Hillary Clinton, Margaret Thatcher, and Indira Gandhi.

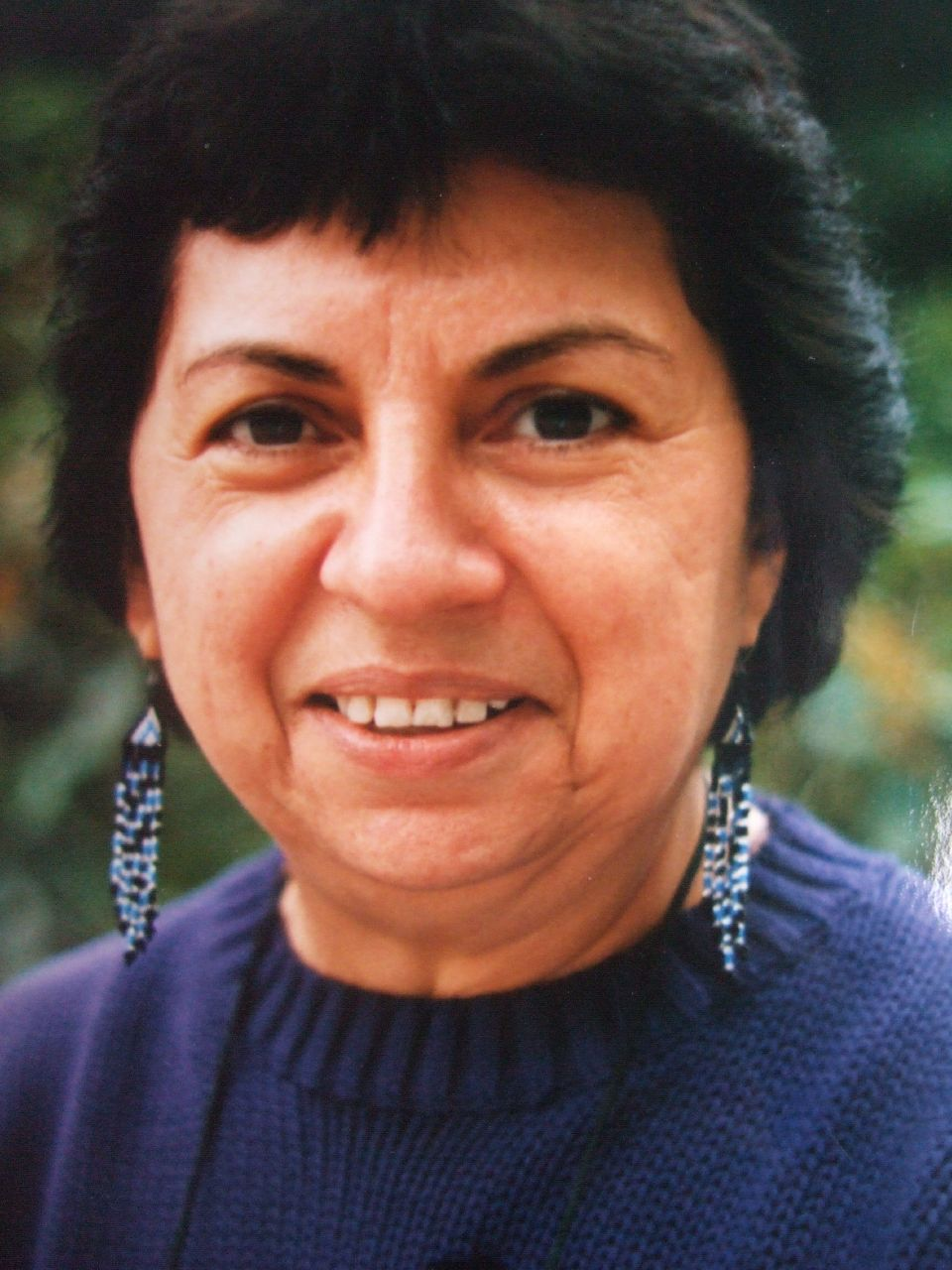
Gloria Anzaldúa

Gloria Anzaldua is also seen as a prominent figure in feminist rhetoric through her work as a transnational feminist. Her work is often recognized by scholars as an "alternative voice." Scholars Wendy Hesford and Eileen Schell argue the importance of bringing transnationality to the field and call for new methodologies and critical comparative perspectives to bring fresh insights. Their work urges scholars to not view rhetoric studies of transnational as passive recipient of transnational studies. However, the authors argue scholars should examine transnational texts and publics and challenge understandings of nations, nationalism, and citizenship. Furthermore, Hesford and Schell suggest how feminist rhetoric rooted in a transnational lens enables us to re-image historical and archival work within the field. Using the examples within their works, they offer essays as examples that show interest in remapping and locations of feminist rhetorics and the transnational link between domestic and international policies that impact women's lives.

=== Gender ===
Feminist rhetoric seeks to redefine the patriarchal rhetorical voice that "separates thought from emotion " by joining thought and emotion in discourse. Furthermore, it works to represent the voices and discourse of genders that go beyond the binary of male and female. Transgender discourse is another main point of focus in feminist rhetoric, which is recognized by scholars as a lack of privilege some authors have. Royster and others have called for research focused on how gender dynamics affect communication, including rhetoric.

According to Liz Lane's, "Feminist Rhetoric in the Digital Sphere: Digital Interventions & the Subversion of Gendered Cultural Scripts, "Whenever a woman has accomplished the same goals as her male counterpart (theorizing, public speaking, successful argument, persuasive letter writing, for example) the stakes immediately rise. She may have achieved X, but she needs X plus 1 to earn a place in rhetoric (15). This 'plus' portion of the equation is central to my focus: how might exhuming lost or underrepresented feminist histories speak to today's applications and expressions of feminist rhetoric? Today's feminist rhetoricians are in the midst of seeking alternative avenues of shaping their voices. I examine these alternative rhetorics as emergent rhetorical subversions online that are advancing feminisms, a tactic that hearkens back to representations of concealed or erased feminist histories. Feminist rhetoric is advancing feminisms online— a distinction that is important to make from "women's rhetoric," which is restricted to only women and does not capture the experience of feminist activists that might identify differently."

=== Race and ethnicity ===
Race and ethnicity is an area of focus for several scholars in feminist rhetoric. They have changed research methods to include international races and ethnicity outside the typical rhetoric canon. Feminist rhetoric focuses on how archiving cultural rhetoric, such as that of Mexican-American women, can create a better understanding of the pedagogy of research methods. An issue that has arisen in feminist rhetoric is the discourse of women of color. Black women scholars serve as a keeper of rhetorical culture by revealing the long-standing diversity of ideas, culture, and aesthetics of Black women's intellectual tradition, and the way Black women have constructed theory and practice in their daily lives." Some female scholars of color have written about their perceived need to mask their identity when sharing their voices and opinions. Female rhetoric scholars of color have had experiences where they voiced their opinions publicly, and were either challenged or not entitled to comment just because they were part of a marginalized group.

=== The role of hope ===
Cheryl Glenn, in "The Language of Rhetorical Feminism, Anchored in Hope," argues for a new approach to rhetoric, one centered on inclusivity and hope, especially for underrepresented voices. Glenn argues for a move toward rhetorical feminism by pointing out how traditional rhetoric has historically silenced women and marginalized groups. This approach values and amplifies these voices, promoting a more equitable and cooperative society. Rebecca Solnit similarly discussed feminist rhetoric as having the power to change and redesign the world, saying it goes beyond just stating injustices, but it actually uses equity as a means of evaluating justice. For Glenn, hope is not simply optimism; it involves actively striving for understanding and inclusivity to triumph over dominance. Glenn's focus on rhetorical feminism emphasizes empathy and dialogue as tools to foster meaningful participation and challenge patriarchal structures.

In her 2015 Ted Talk, "An invitation to men who want a better world for women," Elizabeth Nyamayaro discussed her HeForShe initiative which encouraged men to help become "agents of change for equality." In sharing this conversation, Nyamayaro positioned her discussion as a moment of unity and hopeful progress towards a shared equitable future.

At the Feminisms and Rhetorics Convention in Dayton, Ohio on October 6, 2017, Andrea Lunsford was asked a question on maintaining hope in an interview with Megan Adams and Mariana Grohowski. In addition to interacting with friends and loved ones, Lunsford noted her administrative success of building the writing center at Stanford as a source of hope and gratitude. Lunsford also notes that community and connection sustained her during depressive moments.

Rupi Kaur, a contemporary poet, often writes about her personal life in relation to hope, self-love, and relationships. Kaur's work exemplifies hope for womanhood, for example: "I stand//On the sacrifices//Of a million women before me//Thinking//What can I do//To make this mountain taller//So the women after me//Can see farther." Kaur's poetry shows a universal understanding of hope in feminist rhetoric, and a deliberate focus on what it means to be a woman in today's society for her.

=== The digital sphere ===
Liz Lane, in her article titled "Feminist Rhetoric in the Digital Sphere: Digital Interventions & the Subversion of Gendered Cultural Scripts," argues that recent feminist rhetoric has created a space that subverts patriarchal structures and allows for the interaction of feminist voices in restrictive spheres. Lane discusses how many of contemporary subversions are made far more public through "the media's echoing of hashtags, social media's omnipresence, and the online worlds that these different platforms enable feminist rhetoricians to build." She also discusses the "X+1" model that describes how women must exceed their male counterparts whenever they accomplish something in order to be heard. Lane further discusses how women subvert these power dynamics through physical presence and digital amplification. Throughout the article she reinforces the importance behind social media platforms such as X (formerly Twitter) allowing marginalized groups to amplify their voices but simultaneously are spaces for gendered harassment. Lane underscores this dichotomy by referring to Ellen Pao who was Reddit's interim CEO, who banned and censored popular hate speech subreddits and eventually had to step down from her position due to the harassment she was facing.

Lane also emphasizes the embodied nature of feminist rhetoric online, arguing that even in digital spaces, the female body remains a stie of rhetorical contestation. She notes that gendered attacks often target perceived bodily presence, even when speakers appear anonymous. Drawing on classical rhetorical traditions, Lane situates these digital interventions within a longer history of exclusion, referencing Greco-Roman norms that restricted speech to elite males and likening modern feminist tactics to Sophistic subversions of dominant discourse.

She introduces the concept of "disruptive technologies" to describe how feminist rhetors use digital tools—especially hashtags—as rhetorical interventions that challenge existing power structures and amplify marginalized voices. Lane cites the #FemFuture report as a key example of collective ethos-building, describing online feminism as a "nervous system" of interconnected voices and actions that can sustain activist momentum despite the volatility of digital platforms.

Lane frames the current period as a potential "Fourth Wave" of feminism, using Nancy Hewitt's "radio wave" metaphor. This model reflects the constant presence of feminist discourse online and highlights the influence of digital activism and call-out culture.

== Intersectionality ==
The concept of Intersectionality approaches is applied to numerous studies across feminist rhetoric. In addition, the concept is often applied as it pertains to feminist rhetoric. There is much scholarship around intersectional research methodologies that have contributed to the way scholars apply the concept within their work. The intersectional concept is applied in many different lenses, specifically gender, class, race, sexuality, disability, etc. The concept has been used across many feminist movements. In present day, though coined in 1989 by Kimberlé Crenshaw, the term has been considered a "buzzword." Crenshaw's work expanded shortly after her 1989 article coining the term. She went on to write Mapping the Margins: Intersectionality, Identity Politics, and Violence against Women of Color in 1991" which explored intersectionality through racism and sexism. Crenshaw argued the experiences of women of color are intersecting patterns of racism and sexism and are often under-represented in traditional feminist and antiracist frameworks.

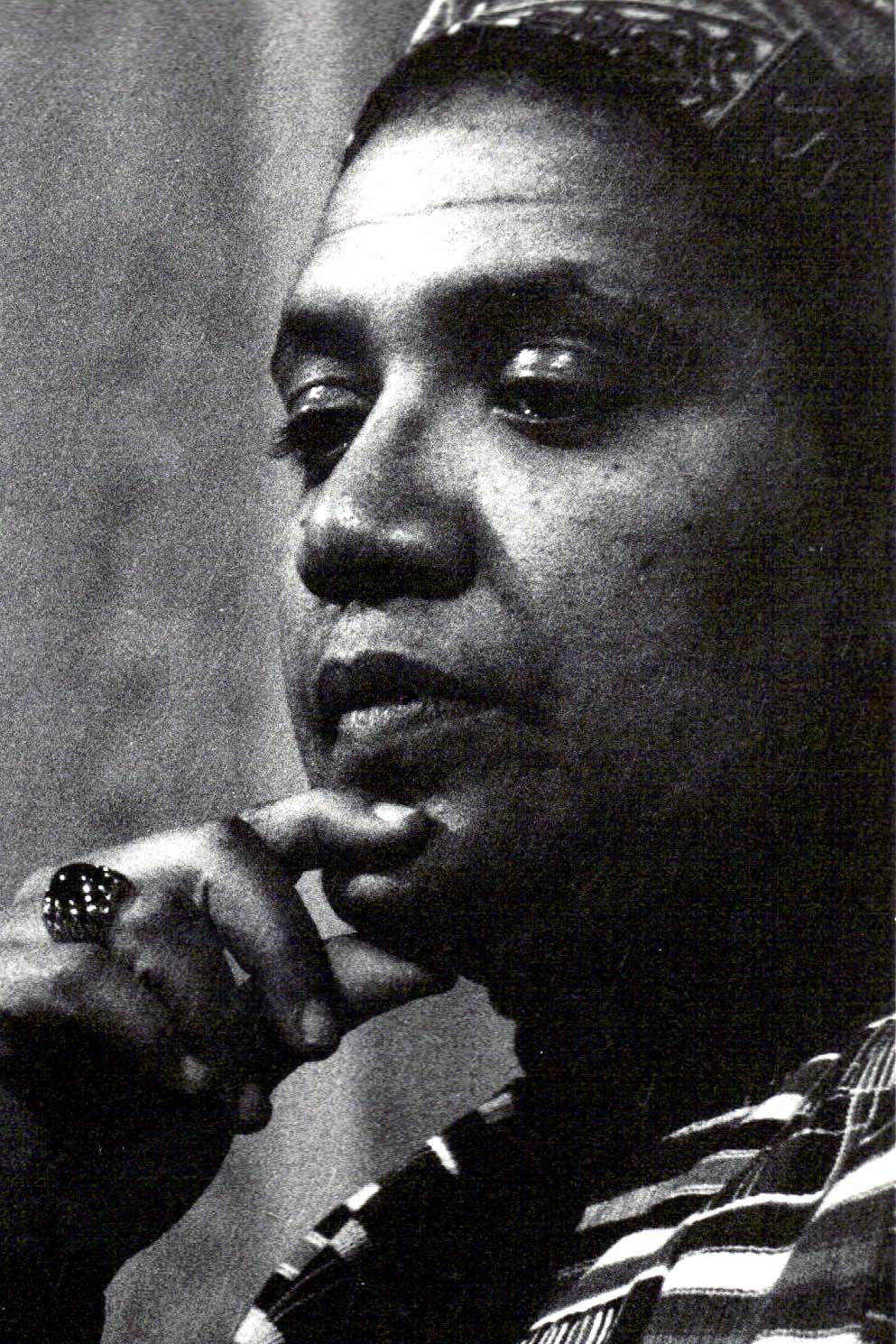
Audre Lorde 1980 Dallas, TX

Audre Lorde is another notable figure when it comes to intersectionality. Lorde was a black feminist, lesbian, poet, mother, and considered a warrior amongst her peers. Through her work, Lorde challenged her peers to think about identity and political intersectionality. In her most famous work, a collection of essays, "Sister Outsider: Essays and Speeches" she denounced how white feminist scholars did not consider the experiences of poor black women. Further, addressing white female scholars to acknowledge the how they conceive women as a group.

== Challenges ==
Feminist rhetoric scholars have noted the difficulty in including diverse voices in the rhetorical canon. Scholars have argued that changes in research methods may be needed to better include the voices of those who are disabled, trans, and queer or marginalized in some other way in rhetoric studies.

Despite longstanding feminist opposition to processes of canonization as inherently imposing limits and excluding perspectives, feminist rhetoric has begun to develop its own canon of commonly referenced texts. Accordingly, feminist rhetoric scholars try to include the works of unknown feminist rhetors in their theorization processes, and develop a gendered analysis or approach that actively includes rhetors who are traditionally excluded from rhetorical canons, such as women of color or low socioeconomic status.

== Applications ==
Rhetors, along with expanding the feminist rhetorical canon, work to make feminist rhetoric applicable in pedagogy and education. Scholars discuss the importance of research, whether that be changing research methods or looking further into textual research. Some suggest this can be done by theorizing, while others want to employ critical imagination. Theory as a research method approaches discourse from different communities as a generalized idea that allows people to participate in the world through rhetoric. Feminist rhetoric sees theory in this sense as a form for people to speak out and be included in the rhetorical canon. Critical imagination is using the silence, or lack of work from feminist rhetors, to extrapolate. Scholars discuss how this involves understanding that there is more to not only feminist rhetoric but feminist practice in theory, than what is written down in textbooks or history. Scholars, such as Royster and Kirsch, acknowledge that feminist rhetoric needs to draw from the silence to help set a new precedent for rhetorical practices in the future. A part of critical imagination is knowing that the documentation of rhetoric thus far isn't the only important rhetoric that should contribute to pedagogy.

== Implications ==
A goal of feminist rhetoric is to be viewed as a rhetorical theory of writing as opposed to a social theory. Feminist rhetoric seeks to influence the pedagogy of writing in high school and other levels of academia. Scholars in the field of feminist rhetoric seek to open academic discourse and pedagogy of rhetoric to all types of people. Also, feminist rhetoric is the space for transforming power relations in the public domain. Through the empowerment of varied narratives and the deconstruction of oppressive language conventions, feminist rhetoric encourages individuals from historically thwarted communities to fully engage in democratic processes and civic engagement. This approach contributes not only to the cultural diversity of democratic exchange but also to a more representative and equitable democracy. Moreover, feminist rhetoric's focus on partnership, dialogue, and comprehension rather than just persuasion does not only apply to interpersonal relationships but also to community development. It enables empathetic communication, active listening, and mutual respect, which are the cornerstones for building healthy, inclusive relationships and communities.

== Notable feminists who impacted rhetoric ==
=== Susan B. Anthony ===
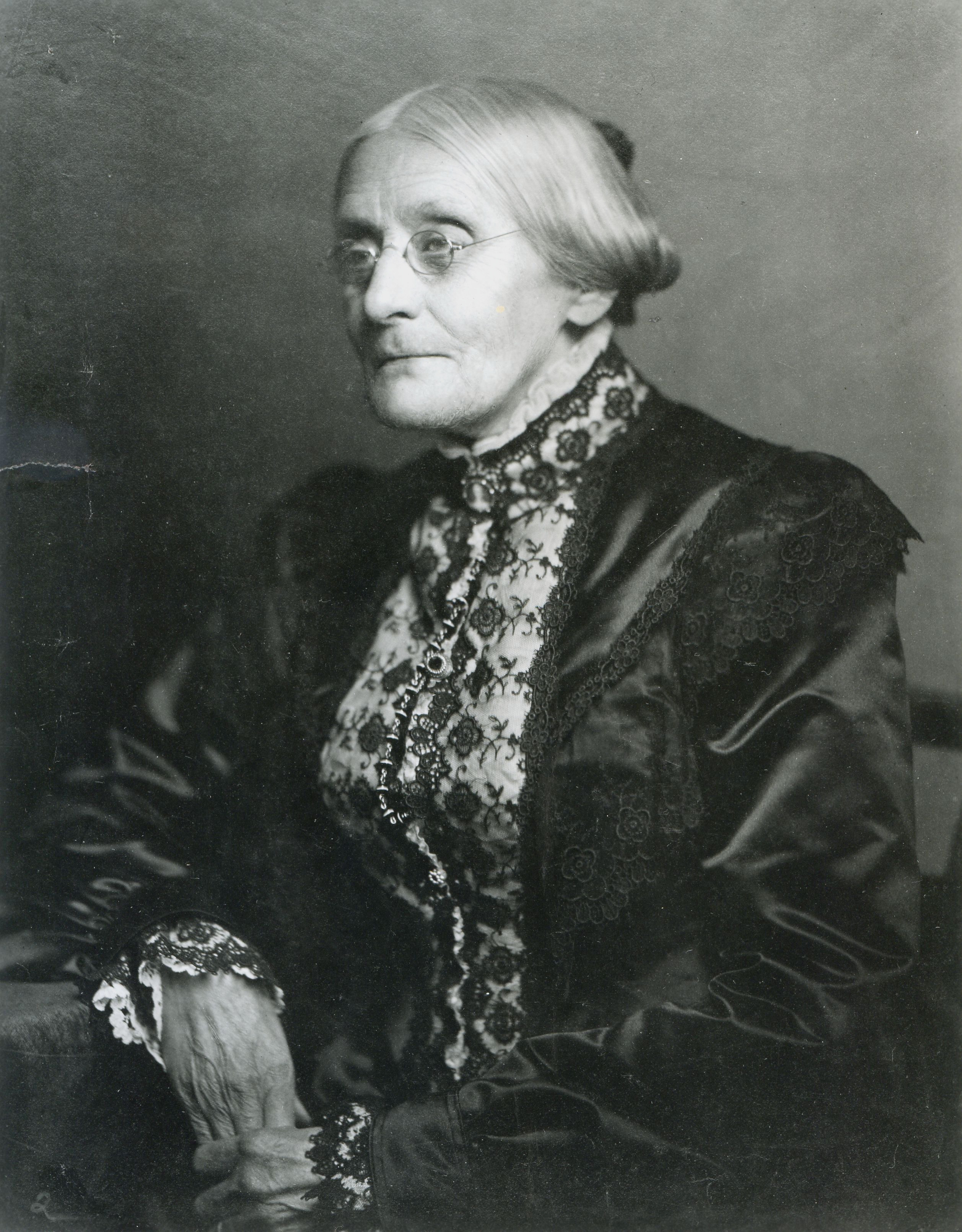
(1820-1906)

Susan B. Anthony played an empowering role as a feminist from the early 1800s to the early 1900s. She played a pivotal role in the women's suffrage movement. In 1845, Anthony and her family moved to Rochester, NY where they became active in the anti-slavery movement. Anthony often voiced her stance on slavery wherever and whenever she could.

In 1848, the Seneca Falls Convention was held in New York. This was the first Woman's Rights Convention in the United States and began the suffrage movement. Anthony and Elizabeth Cady Stanton, an empowering leader, became close friends. They worked together to fight for social equality for over 50 years. They traveled throughout the country, and Anthony gave speeches demanding that all women be given the right to vote. Anthony became very well aware of strategy; she was very disciplined, had high energy, and could organize herself as a strong, successful leader. Anthony and Stanton co-founded the American Equal Rights Association. In 1868, they became editors of the association's newspaper, The Revolution, which helped spread social equality and rights for women.

Susan B. Anthony made endless efforts toward equal rights for women; she even risked being arrested for sharing her ideas in public. She spent her entire life working for women to have all the rights they deserve. In 1888, she helped to merge the two largest suffrage associations into one, the National American Women's Suffrage Association, the association formed in New York in 1869. The association was created to support women across the nation in their suffrage. While she traveled the country spreading her word, she also gathered signatures on petitions and spent time lobbying Congress every year for women. In 1906, she died, 14 years before women were given the right to vote under the 19th Amendment in 1920.

=== bell hooks ===
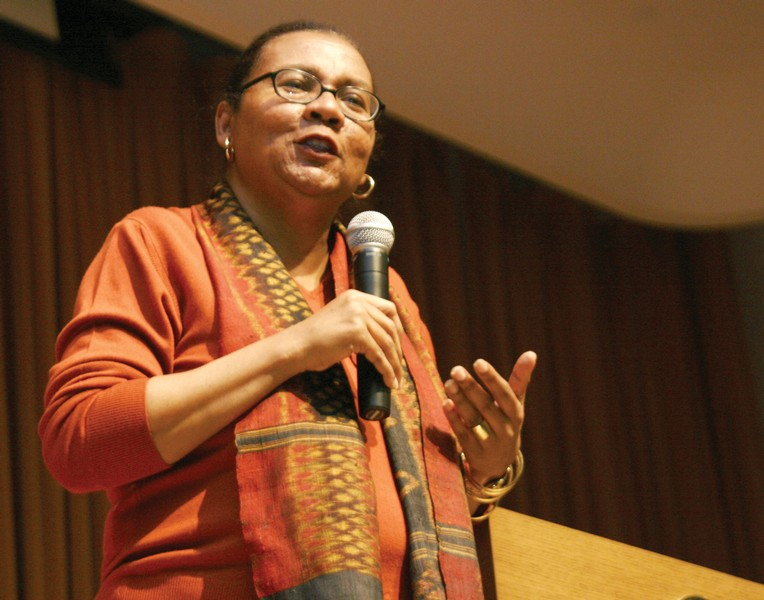
(1952-2021)

bell hooks, a well-known American author, feminist theorist, cultural critic, and educator who was born Gloria Jean Watkins on September 25, 1952, had a major impact on feminist rhetoric. Throughout the course of her long career, Hooks challenged the intersectionality of feminism, race, class, and gender. This challenged the traditional modes of discourse and rhetoric. She utilized lowercase letters to draw attention away from herself and assumed the pen name "bell hooks" in honor of her maternal great-grandmother, Bell Blair Hooks.

Insisting on the significance of voice and language in forming feminist discourse was one of Hooks' most significant contributions to feminist rhetoric. In writing like "Ain't I a Woman: Black Women and Feminism" and "Feminist Theory: From Margin to Center," Hooks highlighted the importance of giving voices to marginalized groups within feminist movements, primarily women of color. She criticized the prevalent communication styles that frequently neglected or repressed these perspectives and promoted inclusive language and discourse that acknowledged the diversity of experiences that women have.

Hooks made great progress in uniting academia and activism—a topic that runs throughout her work on feminist rhetoric. She broke through the ivory tower and into the mainstream with her sophisticated feminist theories thanks to her approachable writing style and public speaking engagements. As a professor, Hooks used her platform to encourage students to critically engage with issues of gender, race, and class because she believed in the transformative power of education. Her writings stressed the value of communication and teamwork in bringing about social change. She urged feminists to utilize rhetoric not just as a potent tool, but as a way to forge connections with one another and have meaningful conversations despite disagreements. bell hooks' legacy in feminist rhetoric still motivates academics, activists, and teachers to question established communication styles, give voice to marginalized groups, and promote social justice.

=== Cheryl Glenn ===
Contemporary figures in the field of feminist rhetoric continue to challenge traditional rhetorical frameworks, like American professor, researcher, and scholar of contemporary rhetorical theory, Cheryl Glenn. Glenn has published countless scholarly works discussing the expansion of rhetorical practices to be inclusive of marginalized groups, particularly the feminist movement. Glenn currently serves as the Women's Studies Director and Distinguished Professor of English at Pennsylvania State University.

Glenn has won many awards for her research and lectured in numerous countries throughout North America, Africa, Europe, Asia, and the Middle East. Glenn and Stephen Browne co-edit the Pennsylvania State University Press pieces, "Rhetoric and Democratic Deliberation". Additionally, she co-edits alongside Shirley Wilson Logan the Southern Illinois University Press article, "Studies in Rhetorics and Feminisms". In recognition of her expertise in rhetoric and influence, Orebro University in Sweden granted her an honorary doctorate in 2015. Glenn's publications such as "Rhetorical Feminism and This Thing Called Hope", "Rhetoric Retold: Regendering the Tradition from Antiquity Through the Renaissance", "Landmark Essays on Rhetoric and Feminism", and several other scholarly works have influenced contemporary rhetoric discourse.

=== Angela Davis ===
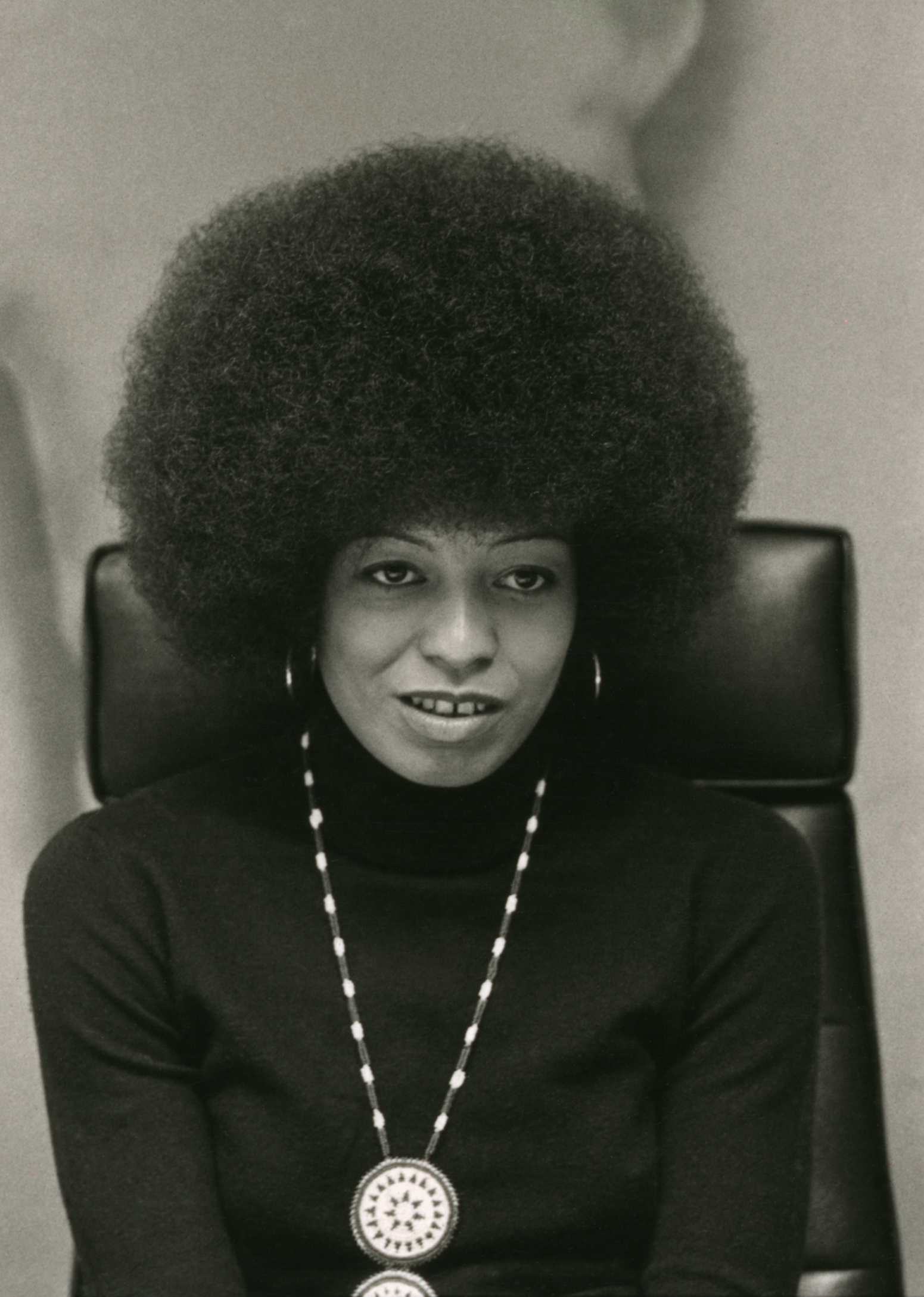
Angela Yvonne Davis (1944)

Angela Yvonne Davis (born January 26, 1944) is an American political activist, philosopher, academic, and author. As the head of the Communist Party USA in the 1960s, she rose to prominence as a radical and counterculture activist. Later, during the Civil Rights Movement, she joined the Black Panther Party. Prison abolition, feminism, and racial justice are Davis's primary focuses.

Davis was raised in a racially separated atmosphere and witnessed firsthand the atrocities of Jim Crow South. She was born in Birmingham, Alabama. While attending Brandeis University, she got engaged in socialist activism and politics. When Davis was listed on the FBI's Ten Most Wanted Fugitives list in 1970, following her involvement in a failed abduction attempt, she became famous across the country. She was cleared of all charges following a well-reported trial, and she went on to become a symbol of defiance against oppressive government policies.

Davis has been a strong voice for social justice, gender equality, and civil rights throughout her career. Her writings, such as "Women, Race & Class" and "Are Prisons Obsolete?" have greatly influenced the conversation around feminism and anti-racism. Inspiring Generations of activists to work for a more just and equitable society, Davis' activism and studies have deepened awareness of the intersections of race, class, and gender.

Beyond her academic pursuits, Davis has been active in several community-based groups and campaigns, such as Critical Resistance and the National Alliance Against Racist and Political Repression. She has been an outspoken supporter of the Global solidarity movements, fighting for the rights of Palestinians and against militarism and imperialism on a worldwide scale. Davis uses her position to elevate marginalized voices and confront oppressive structures as she continues to give lectures across the world on topics related to race, class, and incarceration. Her reputation as one of the most significant figures in modern activism has been cemented by her lifelong dedication to social justice and her steadfast determination to overthrow oppressive regimes.

=== Kimberlè Crenshaw ===
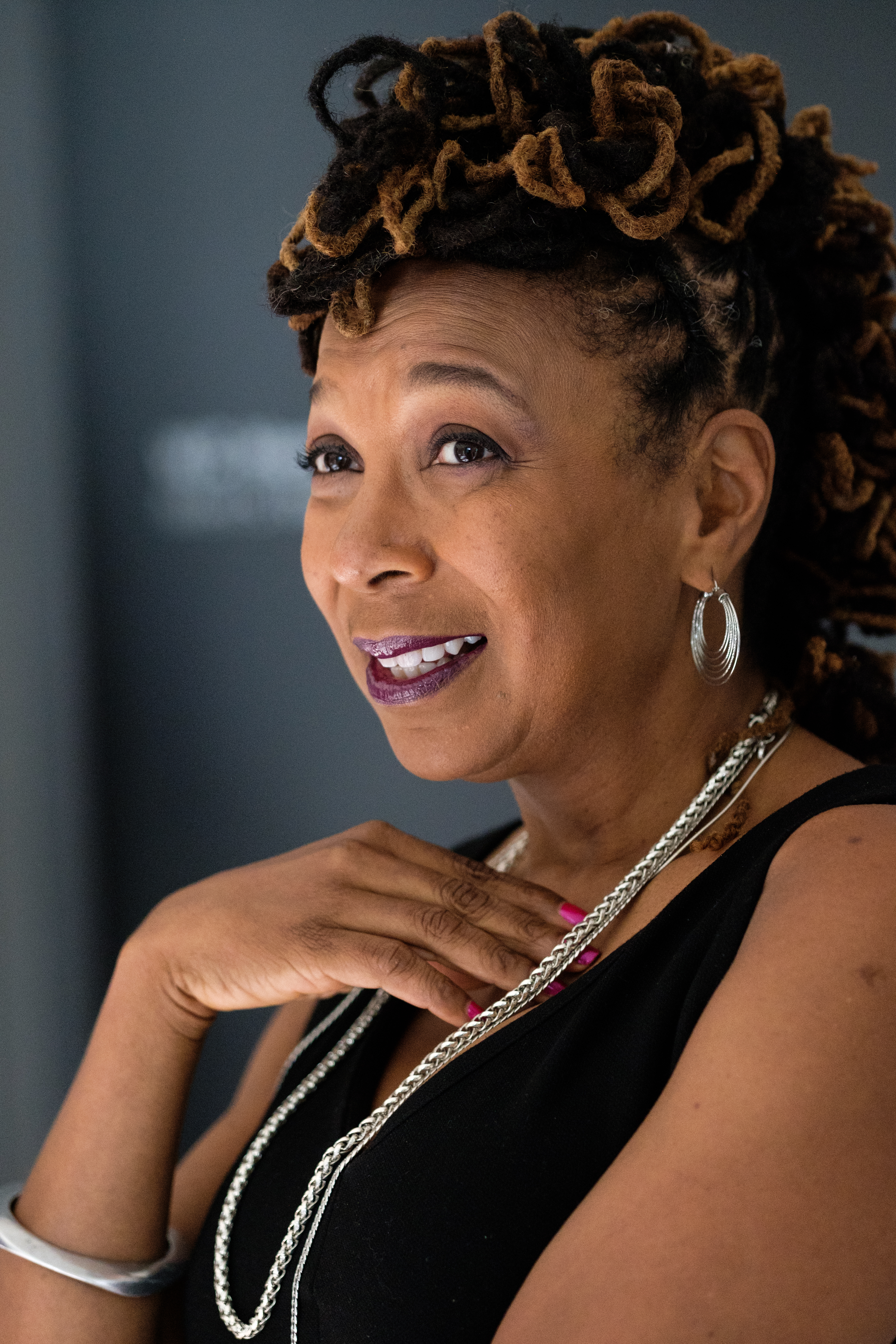
Kimberlé Crenshaw

Kimberlé Crenshaw coined the term intersectionality in 1989, she defined the term as the connection between two constructs such as race and gender. It's at that connection where work to combat discrimination can be most effective. Crenshaw's concept of intersectionality gained popularity in her essay, "Demarginalizing the Intersection of Race and Sex: A Black Feminist Critique of Anti-discrimination Doctrine Feminist Theory and Antiracist Politics." She provided the framework for how intersectionality analysis is commonly used today. The term intersectionality had been around long before Crenshaw coined the term. However, it has become a widespread concept as scholars have used the concept to analyze scholarship over the years through many discriminative natures women face today. Since Crenshaw originated the term, the scholarship around intersectionality has become in-depth and fluid beyond gender studies.

=== Mary Wollstonecraft ===
Mary Wollstonecraft (1759–1797) was a major contributor through the feminist movement, using her writing skills to advocate for women's rights. She revolutionized feminist rhetoric in 1792 when she published A Vindication of the Rights of Women, arguing that like men women were rational beings and equally deserving of education and opportunities. She pointed out that women are not inherently inferior to men, but appear as so because of a lack of equal opportunity and education. In her essay, she criticized conduct books arguing that they are degrading as they demand women to be submissive and less than men. Throughout her lifetime she made it her goal to advocate for the education of daughters pointing to the fact that educated women would benefit everyone in society.
