= Winifred Bryan Horner =

- Occupation: English Professor

Academic background
- Education: Washington University University of Missouri

Academic work
- Discipline: Rhetoric
- Institutions: University of Missouri Texas Christian University
- Main interests: Scottish Enlightenment Rhetoric, Women's Rhetoric

Winifred Bryan Horner (August 31, 1922 – February 4, 2014) was a historian of rhetoric who contributed to research on Scottish Enlightenment and feminist rhetorics.

She served as president of the National Council of Writing Program Administrators from 1985 to 1987 and president of the Rhetoric Society of America from 1987 to 1989.

She was a founder of the Coalition of Feminist Scholars in the History of Rhetoric & Composition. She won the University of Missouri Alumnae Anniversary Award for her "outstanding contribution to the education of women"; a fellowship in the University of Edinburgh Institute for the Humanities; a National Endowment for the Humanities Research Award; and Award for Distinguished Alumna from the University of Missouri. A festschrift was published in her honor in 1993. The Coalition of Feminist Scholars in the History of Rhetoric & Composition have an award in her honor also, the Winifred Bryan Horner Outstanding Book Award. The student chapter of Rhetoric Society of America at Texas Christian University is also named in her honor.

== Biography ==
Horner was born on August 31, 1922. Horner attended Washington University for her bachelor's degree, graduating in 1943. She graduated with her M.A. degree from the University of Missouri-Columbia in 1961. She gained tenure at MU and served as assistant director of composition from 1974 to 1980. Horner attended the University of Michigan for her doctorate, which she obtained in 1975. She was promoted to full professor in 1984. The next year, she moved to Texas Christian University to serve as the Lillian Radford Chair of Rhetoric and Composition. She was the first woman to serve in this position. She served in this position from 1985 to 1993. She retired in 1996. She died on February 4, 2014.

== Selected works ==
- Composition and Literature: Bridging the Gap (1983)
- Rhetoric in the Classical Tradition (1988)
- The Present State of Scholarship in Historical and Contemporary Rhetoric (1990).
- "The Roots of Modern Writing Instruction: Eighteenth- and Nineteenth-Century Britain," Rhetoric Review (1990)
- "Nineteenth-Century Rhetoric at the University of Glasgow with An Annotated Bibliography of Archival Materials," Rhetoric Society Quarterly (1990)
- Nineteenth-Century Rhetoric at the Universities of Aberdeen and St. Andrews with An Annotated Bibliography of Archival Materials," Rhetoric Society Quarterly (1990)
- Nineteenth-Century Scottish Rhetoric: The American Connection (1993)
- Life Writing (1996)
- "Reinventing Memory and Delivery," in Inventing a Discipline: Rhetoric Scholarship in Honor of Richard Young (2000)
- (with Michael Leff) Rhetoric and Pedagogy: Its History, Philosophy, and Practice: Essays in Honor of James J. Murphy (2013)

== See also ==
- Women's rhetoric
- Richard Leo Enos
- Jim W. Corder
- Rhetoric Society of America
