= Contact zone =

Concept in ethnography

In ethnography, a contact zone is a conceptual space where different cultures interact.

In a 1991 keynote address to the Modern Language Association titled "Arts of the Contact Zone", Mary Louise Pratt introduced the concept, saying "I use this term to refer to social spaces where cultures meet, clash and grapple with each other, often in contexts of highly asymmetrical relations of power, such as colonialism, slavery, or their aftermaths as they are lived out in many parts of the world today". Pratt described a site for linguistic and cultural encounters, wherein power is negotiated and struggle occurs.

Although when introduced this term was in the context of literacy and literary theories, the term has been appropriated to conversations across the humanities and has been used in the context of feminist theory, critical race theory, postcolonial theory and in discussions of teaching and pedagogy. The contact zone is similar to other concepts that address relationality and contiguity such as positionality, standpoint theory, perspectivism, intersectionality, and relationality.

== "Arts of the Contact Zone" ==
In "Arts of the Contact Zone", Pratt describes a manuscript from 1613 penned by Andean man named Felipe Guaman Poma de Ayala. The manuscript was a letter written to King Philip III of Spain and was titled The First New Chronicle and Good Government. The manuscript details Spanish conquest in South America. Pratt cites the manuscript as an example of autoethnography. She writes, "Guaman Poma's New Chronicle is an instance of what I have proposed to call an autoethnographic text, by which I mean a text in which people undertake to describe themselves in ways that engage with representations others have made of them" (35). The New Chronicle ends with a revisionist account of the Spanish conquest. Pratt uses the manuscript as an example of an oppressed person or group resisting hegemony, and she connects the practice of autoethnography, critique and resistance to the creation of contact zones.

=== Transculturation ===
Pratt also shares the example of Poma's New Chronicle to give an example of "transculturation" or a term that ethnographers have used "to describe the process whereby members of subordinated or marginal groups select and invent from materials transmitted by a dominant metropolitan culture". Additionally, Pratt gives the origin of the term "transculturation," writing, "The term, originally coined by Cuban sociologist Fernando Ortiz in the 1940, aimed to replace concepts of acculturation and assimilation used to characterize culture under conquest" (36). Pratt confirms "Transculturation, like autoethnography, is a phenomenon of the contact zone".

=== Purpose of the Contact Zone ===
Pratt states that one of the purposes of the contact zone is "intended in part to contrast with ideas of community that underlie much of the thinking about language, communication and culture that gets done in the academy". Pratt takes issue with the notion of communities as "imagined entities" and that this line of thinking creates a type of problematic nationalism.

== Other uses ==
The contact zone has been used outside of its original spatial concept to describe connections between identity groups that are interacting outside of a specific, local, physical space.

The notion of the contact zone has been used to facilitate discussions within composition studies on the topics of multiculturalism, multilingualism and critical pedagogy. The contact zone is used by scholars as a trope for visualizing solutions to conflicts. Marilyn Edelstein discussed the contact zone and multiculturalism. In Edelstein's article, "Multiculturalisms, Past and Present, and Future" questions of inclusion versus difference are prominent. In "Professing Multiculturalism: The Politics of Style in the Contact Zone,” Min-Zhan Lu discussed multilingualism and the contact zone, where the student text is the site of struggle. Pratt also uses the contact zone to discuss the classroom space. Pratt writes, "All the students in the class had the experience... of having their cultures discussed and objectified in ways that horrified them; all the students experienced face-to-face the ignorance and incomprehension, and occasionally the hostility of others ... Along with rage, incomprehension, and pain, there were exhilarating moments of wonder and revelation, mutual understanding, and new wisdom—the joys of the contact zone".

Patricia Bizzell went so far as to suggest that English studies be organized around "contact zones" rather than historical periods. Bizzell proposed, "I am suggesting that we organize English studies not in terms of literary or chronological periods, nor essentialized racial or gender categories, but rather in terms of historically defined contact zones, moments when different groups within the society contend for the power to interpret what is going on" (167). Bizzell uses the term to refer to moments in space and time, rather than abstract spaces in the mind or in literature. She describes contact zones as "circumscribed in time and space, but with elastic boundaries".

James Clifford applies the notion of contact zone to the museum studies in his book "Routes: Travel and Translation in the Late Twentieth Century" (1997). Drawing on the ethnographic research among museum curators, anthropologists, experts on Northwest Coast art, and a group of Tlingit elders in the basement of the Portland Museum of Art (Oregon) in 1989, Clifford shows that the museum is more than just a place of consultation or research. He states, "When museums are seen as contact zones, their organising structure as a collection becomes an ongoing historical, political, moral relationship -- a power-charged set of exchanges, of push and pull. [...] A centre and a periphery are assumed: the centre point of gathering, the periphery an area of discovery. The museum, usually located in a metropolitan city, is the historical destination for the cultural productions it lovingly and authoritatively salvages, care for, and interprets". Some scholars, however, question such an approach. For example, Robin Boast returns to the original meaning of the contact zone developed by Pratt and writes about the neo-colonial context of contact zone. He states, "on one hand, I welcome the new collaboration, and, on the other, I raise a serious concern that the neocolonial nature of these contact zones could destroy the very empowerment that it is meant to engender." In his article Boast draws attention to the important but rather underappreciated part of contact zone, authoethnography. He concludes that the autoethnography is a "fundamental neocolonial rhetorical genre and even instrument of appropriation".

== See also ==
- Cross-cultural communication
- Interculturalism
- Translanguaging
- First contact (anthropology)
- Urban vitality
