= Shirley Wilson Logan =

Scholar of African American women's rhetoric

- Occupation: English professor

Academic background
- Education: University of Maryland College Park
- Alma mater: University of Maryland College Park University of North Carolina Chapel Hill Johnson C. Smith University
- Influences: Karlyn Kohrs Campbell, Hazel Carby, Frances Smith Foster, Sharon Harley, Lillian O'Connor, Nell Parker, Mary Helen Washington

Academic work
- Discipline: Rhetoric
- Institutions: University of Maryland College Park
- Main interests: Nineteenth-Century African American Women's Rhetoric

Shirley Wilson Logan is a scholar of African American women's rhetoric, particularly from the nineteenth century. She served as president of the Coalition of Women Scholars in the History of Rhetoric and Composition from 1998 to 2000. She also served as chair of the Conference on College Composition and Communication in 2003. In addition to these positions, Logan has served on the editorial board of College Composition and Communication, Rhetoric Review, and Legacy: A Journal of American Women Writers. The Shirley Wilson Logan Diversity Scholarship is named in her honor.

== Biography ==
Logan grew up in South Carolina. She attended Johnson C. Smith University in Charlotte, North Carolina for her bachelor's degree. After graduation, she received her masters degree the University of North Carolina with a thesis on Richard Wright. She obtained a doctoral degree from the University of Maryland in Curriculum and instruction in 1988. Logan began working as Assistant Director of the University of Maryland Professional Writing Program, then transitioned into the main director role. She would go on to serve as the Director of Professional Writing for seven years. Logan published key articles and monographs establishing African American women's rhetoric as a field, writing on Ida B. Wells, Anna Julia Cooper, Victoria Matthews, and Frances Harper, raising awareness of the contributions of these women to rhetorical theory, practice, and pedagogy. She served as president of the Coalition of Women Scholars in the History of Rhetoric and Composition from 1998 to 2000. Logan also served as chair of the Conference on College Composition and Communication in 2003. Later, she co-chaired the 2014 Maryland Conference on Academic and Professional Writing.

== Selected works ==
- With Pen and Voice: A Critical Anthology of Nineteenth-Century African American Women (1995)
- "We Are Coming": The Persuasive Discourse of Nineteenth-Century Black Women (1999)
- Liberating Language: Sites of Rhetorical Education in Nineteenth-Century Black America (2008)
- (with Wayne H. Slater) Academic and Professional Writing in an Age of Accountability (2018)

== See also ==
- Women's rhetoric
- Geneva Smitherman
- Elaine B. Richardson
- Gwendowlyn D. Pough
- Keith Gilyard
- Vershawn Ashanti Young
