= Gwendolyn D. Pough =

American academic and scholar in rhetoric and composition studies

- Born: United States
- Spouse: Cedric Bolton
- Awards: Lisa Ede Mentoring Award

Academic background
- Education: Miami University
- Doctoral advisors: Susan Jarratt and Cheryl Johnson

Academic work
- Discipline: Rhetoric & Composition and Women's and Gender Studies
- Institutions: Syracuse University, University of Minnesota

Dr. Gwendolyn D. Pough (1970s) is an American academic and scholar in Rhetoric and Composition studies. She is a post-Civil Rights African-American academic who developed as a writer during the rise of hip-hop culture. Pough is a former president of the Rhetoric Society of America (RSA).

== Biography ==
=== Early life ===
The oldest of five daughters, Pough (pronounced Pew) was raised by her mother Donna Pough in Paterson, New Jersey. As a tween, she avidly read romance novels and wrote her own short stories. In high school and college, she dreamed about becoming a successful novelist but realized that she would need a job that provided enough money and time to allow writing on the side. As an undergraduate, Pough substitute taught, which led her to rule out teaching high school teacher as a career. Instead Pough enrolled in graduate school.

=== Education ===
Pough received her B.A. in English with a minor in African, African-American, and Caribbean Studies from the William Paterson College in 1992 where she graduated Cum Laude. Her undergraduate program included courses in Rhetoric and Composition Studies, which intrigued her. For her Masters of Art, she graduated with honors in English with a concentration in Creative Writing and Composition Studies from Northeastern University in 1994. She decided to pursue an academic career and was accepted into a Rhetoric and Composition-focused doctoral program at Miami University. While in the program, Pough considered returning to creative writing but was advised to complete the program first. Pough did so, earning her Ph.D. in English in 2000, under the direction of Susan Jarratt and Cheryl Johnson.

=== Teaching and Professional Experiences ===
Pough has held numerous leadership positions at her institution and in scholarly organizations, and she has been honored for her teaching and mentoring work. Pough is currently the Associate Dean of Strategic Initiatives at Syracuse University and the Dean's Professor of the Humanities. Previously she held the role of Associate Dean of Diversity, Equity, Inclusion, and Accessibility in the College of Arts and Sciences'. At Syracuse, Pough is a tenured member of the Women's and Gender Studies department, where she has served as chair and its director of Graduate Studies. In 2023, Pough received the Lisa Ede Mentoring award from the Coalition of Feminist Scholars in the History of Rhetoric & Composition. In recognition of her excellent teaching at Syrcause, Pough was appointed the William P. Tolley Distinguished Teaching Professor in the Humanities (2020-2022 term). Pough is also the former president of the Rhetoric Society of America and the first black woman to hold the position.

Her current research and teaching interests are feminist theory, African-American rhetoric, women's studies, and hip-hop culture.

In her 2015 book Check it While I Wreck It: Black Womanhood, Hip Hop Culture, and the Public Sphere, Pough compares Queen Latifah's song "U.N.I.T.Y." to Sojourner Truth's 1851 "Ain't I a Woman?" speech. Both have the similar theme of expecting women to be heard and respected. Additionally, Pough emphasizes the importance of "U.N.I.T.Y." by stating how the song discusses issues on Queen Latifah's own terms and igniting a conversation.

She has also been critical of what she regards as racist division in the women's rights movement, stating that black women were ignored during the women's suffrage movement and that this trend is still current. Pough shared her concerns about the 2017 Women's March on Washington, an event planned to protest Donald Trump. She said that some of these same women attending the protest had also voted for him, and said that 94% of black women voted for Hillary Clinton and 53% of white women had voted for Donald Trump.

She co-edited Home Girls Make Some Noise: Hip-Hop Feminism Anthology. She was guest editor for three special anonymous peer reviewed journals: Peitho: Journal of the Coalition of Feminist Scholars in the History of Rhetoric & Composition, Social Identities, Journal for the Study of Race, Nation and Culture, and FEMSPEC..

In addition to her scholarly work, Pough is a romance author under the pseudonym of Gwyneth Bolton. She is a ten-time winner of the Romance Slam Jam Emma Award; she also won the Romance in Color Reviewer's Choice Award for "Favorite New Author" in 2006. Pough's pen name references her husband Cedric Bolton. Pough resumed writing creatively after completing her first scholarly book; she was inspired by her study of black women's book clubs.

== Selected works ==
=== Books ===
- Check it While I Wreck It: Black Womanhood, Hip Hop Culture, and the Public Sphere (2015)
- Home Girls Make Some Noise: Hip-Hop Feminism Anthology (2007).

=== Articles ===
- "Empowering Rhetoric: Black Students Writing Black Panthers" (2002)
- Love Feminism, but Where's my Hip-Hop? Shaping a Black Feminist Identity (2002)
- "Love Feminism, but where's my Hip-Hop? Shaping a Black Feminist Identity" (2002)
- "Do Ladies Run This . . . ? Some Thoughts on Hip-Hop Feminism" (2003)
- "Seeds and Legacies: Tapping the potential hip-hop" (2004)
- "Rhetoric that Should have Moved the People: Rethinking the Black Panther Party" (2004)
- "Speculative Black Women: Magic, Fantasy, and the Supernatural" (2005)
- "Women, Rap, Wreck" (2006)
- "Hip-Hop Soul Divas and Rap Music: Critiquing the Love that Hate Produced" (2007)
- "What It Do, Shorty?: Women, hip-hop, and a feminist agenda" (2007)
- "An Introduction of Sorts for Hip-Hop Feminism" (2007)
- "The Remix: Revisit, Rethink, Revise, Renew" (2010)
