= Adjovi Lonlongno Apedo =

Togolese politician

Togolese Minister of Social Action, Women's Promotion and Literacy
- In office 1 October 2020 – 23 August 2024
- Appointed by: Faure Gnassingbé
- President: Faure Gnassingbé
- Prime Minister: Victoire Tomégah-Dogbé
- Preceded by: Tchabinandi Kolani Yentchare
- Succeeded by: Kossiwa Zinsou-Klassou

Adjovi Lonlongno Apedoh, wife of Anakoma, is a Togolese politician. She is Minister of Social Action, Women's Promotion and Literacy from 1 October 2020 to 23 August 2024 in the first Tomegah Dogbé government.

== Biography ==
Adjovi Lonlongno Apedoh was appointed by President Faure Gnassingbé and Prime Minister Victoire Tomegah Dogbé in October 2020. She is one of the fifteen new ministers introduced by this government. Its work primarily focuses on the advancement of women, particularly by encouraging gender equality despite social and systemic obstacles. She particularly emphasized this point a few days after her appointment as minister, on the occasion of the International Day of the Girl Child, highlighting girls' education with a speech and the awarding of fifty prizes for the best female results in the brevet. She repeated this gesture the following year with sixty female baccalaureate graduates (second cycle) as part of the program for academic excellence and leadership of Togolese girls.

She is involved in implementing the HeForShe campaign in Togo, a campaign that aims to involve men in the fight for gender equality. She also supports various events, including the fourth World Summit of Girls, Women's Day, the generation equality forum or the women's forum.

She also aims to reduce poverty and strengthen social cohesion, which leads her to meet with agents and staff in her region of origin, Atakpamé.

== Distinctions ==
- Officer of the International Order of Civil Protection
