= Mary Louise Pratt =

American academic

Mary Louise Pratt (born 1948) is a professor emeritus of Latin American literature and linguistics at New York University.

== Education ==
She received her B.A. in modern languages and literatures from the University of Toronto in 1970, her M.A. in linguistics from the University of Illinois Urbana-Champaign in 1971, and her PhD in comparative literature from Stanford University in 1975.

== Career ==
Her first book, Toward a Speech Act Theory of Literary Discourse, made an important contribution to critical theory by demonstrating that the foundation of written literary narrative can be seen in the structure of oral narrative. In the book, Pratt uses the research of William Labov to show that common structures that can be found in both literary and oral narratives.

In her more recent research, Pratt has studied what she calls contact zones: "social spaces where cultures meet, clash, and grapple with each other, often in contexts of highly asymmetrical relations of power, such as colonialism, slavery, or their aftermaths as they are lived out in many parts of the world today." In her article "Arts of the Contact Zone", Pratt also introduces the term "autoethnographic texts," for "text[s] in which people undertake to describe themselves in ways that engage with representations others have made of them."

Before retirement, Pratt was a Silver Professor at New York University. As a part of the appointment, she wrote a Silver Dialogue (an essay discussing a major issue in her field) about obstacles and possible solutions for promoting language learning in America. Pratt frames her argument with an anecdote from a multicultural wedding, using it as a segue to expose American myths about language. Pratt challenges four common misconceptions about language learning: the willing rejection of heritage languages by immigrants, American hostility to multilingualism, the limit of second language learning to early childhood, and the need of language expertise solely for national security. With each misconception Pratt shows how these factors have come together to create a resistance to language learning that has helped cause the national security crisis that the Critical Language Institutes are trying to solve. Pratt has been an advocate for multilingual education to extend mutual understanding among communities in the United States and beyond.

== Honors ==
Pratt was elected to the American Academy of Arts and Sciences in 2019.

== Selected works ==
- Toward a Speech Act Theory of Literary Discourse. Bloomington: Indiana University Press. 1977. ISBN 0-253-37006-X.
- "Arts of the Contact Zone". Profession. 91. Modern Language Association. 1991.
- Imperial Eyes: Travel Writing and Transculturation. London: Routledge. 1992. ISBN 0-415-02675-X.
- Critical Passions: Selected Essays. Edited with Kathleen Newman. Durham, NC: Duke University Press. 1999. ISBN 0-8223-2248-X.
- "Des-escribir a Pinochet". Creación y resistencia: la narrativa de Diamela Eltit, 1983-1998 (in Spanish). Edited by María Inés Lagos. Providencia, Santiago: Universidad de Chile, Facultad de Filosofía y Humanidades, Centro de Estudios de Género y Cultura en América Latina (CEGECAL) : Editorial Cuarto Propio. 2000.
- Planetary Longings. Durham, NC: Duke University Press. 2022. ISBN 978-1-4780-1566-6.
