= Gregory Clark (rhetorician) =

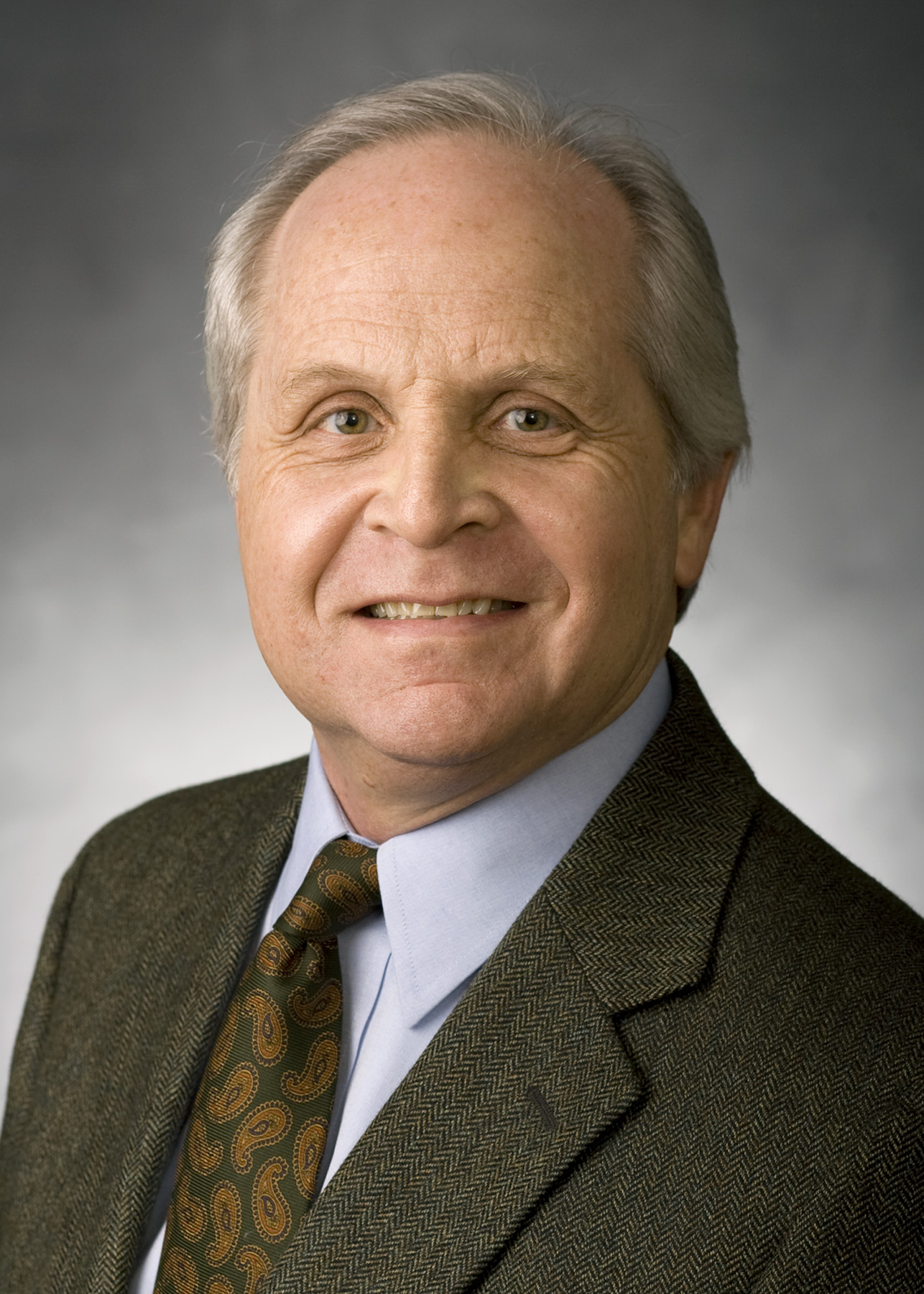

Gregory Clark (born 1950 in Provo, Utah) is an American scholar and teacher working in rhetorical studies and American cultural criticism. He retired from academic work in 2021. His work is both theoretical and critical, developing concepts of how influence works that he then uses to study capacities for influence inherent in American cultural practices.

His theoretical project centers on an ongoing exploration of rhetorical aesthetics: ways that rhetoric works through aesthetic means and ways that aesthetic encounters do rhetorical work. Clark's primary resource for this work is the work of Kenneth Burke. His critical project has examined early American literature and oratory, American landscapes, and recently has focused on American music in order to trace ways the experiences they provide expose and shape aspects of American identity. In 2015 he began an ongoing project with pianist and composer, Marcus Roberts, to teach and demonstrate democratic practices of personal and civic interaction through the model of jazz music.

Clark was Professor of English at Brigham Young University where he led the American Studies and University Writing programs, chaired the English Department and served as associate dean in the College of Humanities. He taught courses in rhetorical theory, composition theory, and rhetorical criticism of aesthetic expression in several art forms. He also taught periodically in the graduate program in rhetoric and writing at University of Utah

Gregory Clark has been a leader in the Rhetoric Society of America, serving as a member of the Board (1996-1998), Editor of Rhetoric Society Quarterly (2000–2007), and Executive Director (2008-2012). In July 2016 he became President.

In 2011 Clark was appointed as the inaugural fellow of the National Jazz Museum in Harlem. In 2012 he was awarded the University Professorship at Brigham Young University.

He and his spouse, Linda, have three daughters, and seven grandchildren.

== Publications ==
Gregory Clark's books

- Civic Jazz: American Music and Kenneth Burke on the Art of Getting Along (University of Chicago Press, 2015)
- Trained Capacities: John Dewey, Rhetoric, and Democratic Practice, with Brian Jackson. (University of South Carolina Press, 2014)
- Rhetorical Landscapes in America: Variations on a Theme by Kenneth Burke (University of South Carolina Press, 2004)
- Oratorical Culture in America: Essays on the Transformation of Nineteenth-Century Rhetoric, with S. Michael Halloran. (Southern Illinois University Press, 1993)
- Dialogue, Dialectic, and Conversation: A Social Perspective on the Function of Writing (Southern Illinois University Press, 1990)

Recent articles and chapter

- “He Huaka‘i at Ha’ena: Treasured Places and the Rhetorical Art of Identity,” with Chelle Pahinui, 219-236. HuiHui: Navigating Art and Literature in the Pacific, ed. Jeffrey Carroll, Brandy Nalani McDougall, and Georganne Nordstrom. University of Hawaii Press, 2015.
- “Transcendence After Dialogue,” 170-186. Transcendence by Perspective: Meditations on and with Kenneth Burke, ed. Bryan Crable. Parlor Press, 2014.
- “John Dewey and the Rhetoric of Democratic Culture,” with Brian Jackson, 1-24. Trained Capacities: John Dewey, Rhetoric, and Democratic Practice, ed. Brian Jackson and Gregory Clark. University of South Carolina Press, 2014.
- “Remembering Zion: Architectural Encounters in a National Park,” 29-54.Observation Points: The Visual Poetics of National Parks, ed. Thomas Patin. University of Minnesota Press, 2012.
- “’A Child Born of the Land’: The Rhetorical Aesthetic of Hawaiian Song.” Rhetoric Society Quarterly 42:3 (July 2012), 251-270.
- “Experiencing Democratic Identity: Paul Woodruff’s Reverence, First Democracy, and The Necessity of Theatre,” Rhetoric Society Quarterly 41:1 (Winter 2011), 75-85.
- “Rhetorical Experience and The Jazz Museum in Harlem,” 113-135. Places of Public Memory: The Rhetoric of Museums and Memorials, ed. Greg Dickinson, Brian L. Ott, and Carole Blair. University of Alabama Press, 2010
- “National Park Landscapes and the Rhetorical Display of a Civic Religion,” with S. Michael Halloran. 141-156. Rhetorics of Display, ed. Lawrence Prelli. University of South Carolina Press, 2006
- “‘Tossing’ and ‘Eye-Crossing’: Apprehensive in the American Landscape.” KB Journal 2:2 (Spring 2006). Special issue, “Kenneth Burke and Ecocriticism,” ed. Robert Wess. http://kbjournal.org/spring2006
- “Virtuosos and Ensembles: Rhetorical Lessons from Jazz,” 31-46. The Private, the Public, and the Published: Reconciling Private Lives and Public Rhetoric, ed. Barbara Couture and Thomas Kent. Utah State University Press, 2004.
