= David Zarefsky =

American communication scholar (born 1946)

David H. Zarefsky (born 1946) is an American communication scholar with research specialties in rhetorical history and criticism. He is professor emeritus at Northwestern University. He is a past president of the National Communication Association (USA) and the Rhetoric Society of America. Among his publications are six books and over 70 scholarly articles concerned with American public discourse (both historical and contemporary), argumentation, rhetorical criticism, and public speaking are books on the Lincoln-Douglas debates and on the rhetoric of the War on Poverty during the Johnson administration. His lectures on argumentation and rhetoric can be heard in a course for The Teaching Company.

== Early education and forensics career ==
As a member of the forensics team at Bellaire High School in Houston, Texas, Zarefsky won first place in the National Forensic League's Oratory competition in 1964. His brother, also a Bellaire and Northwestern alumnus, is U.S. Magistrate Judge Ralph Zarefksy. He enrolled as an undergraduate student at Northwestern University later that year, beginning a highly successful career as an intercollegiate debate competitor. Zarefsky earned National Debate Tournament (NDT) individual top speaker honors in 1968. While pursuing a major from Northwestern's Department of Communication Studies, Zarefsky also took courses in English, Political Science, and History.

Following completion of his B.S., Zarefsky stayed at Northwestern to pursue advanced degrees in Speech and coach the debate team. During this period, his teams were regularly recognized as among the best in the nation, with the pair of Eliot Mincberg and Ron Marmer winning the 1973 NDT. As a debate coach and judge, Zarefsky earned a reputation for his systematic and thorough approach. For example, he "sat for a full half hour reviewing his flow chart" before rendering the pivotal decision in the 1969 NDT semifinal round between Harvard University and Loyola University. He made up for difficulty in spotting differences in the makes and models of cars by scanning university parking lots to find the license plate of his team's vehicle at any given tournament.

Zarefsky pioneered a policy debate judging paradigm called "hypothesis testing," which spells out how debate judges can draw metaphorically upon the scientific method's process of weighing scientific conjectures and refutations. Upon his retirement as Director of Forensics in 1975, Zarefsky was voted by his peers as the second best coach of the decade during the 1970s.

== Research and teaching ==
Two of Zarefsky's books have won the Winans-Wichelns Award for Distinguished Scholarship in Rhetoric Rhetoric and Public Address, an award of the National Communication Association.

Zarefsky has taught courses in the study of American public discourse, with a special focus on the pre-Civil War years and on the pre-Civil War years and on the 1960s. He also has taught courses in argumentation theory, persuasion, and public speaking. On thirteen different occasions he was named to the student government's honor roll for distinguished teaching. Zarefsky also has two video courses, "Abraham Lincoln: In His Own Words" and "Argumentation: The Study of Effective Reasoning," marketed by The Teaching Company.

Some of Zarefsky's more notable students include: University of California, Irvine Founding Law School Dean Erwin Chemerinsky; United States Court of Appeals for the District of Columbia Circuit federal appellate judge Merrick B. Garland; and former White House Chief of Staff and former Mayor of Chicago Rahm Emanuel. Asked about Emanuel's reputation for ruthlessness, Zarefsky was quoted in The Daily Northwestern as saying, "I think it can be applied to him in a positive sense because he's just very determined to achieve his goals."

== Administrative leadership ==
Zarefsky joined the Northwestern faculty in 1968 and rose through the ranks, achieving promotion to Professor in 1982. He also has held a series of administrative appointments, including Chair of the Department of Communication Studies (1975–83), Associate Dean of the School of Speech (1983–88), and from 1988 to 2000, Dean of the School of Speech (later renamed the School of Communication), a 12-year tenure notable for its length among Northwestern deans serving during that era. In 1993 Zarefsky served as president of the National Communication Association and in 2001 he received its Distinguished Service Award. He held the presidency of the Central States Communication in 1986–87. In 2006–07 he served as president of the Rhetoric Society of America. He has held numerous leadership positions in the American Forensic Association, whose journal he edited from 1977 to 1980. From 1984 to 1989 he was the Director of the National Debate Tournament.

== Recent publications ==
- "Making the Case for War: Colin Powell at the United Nations," Rhetoric & Public Affairs, 10 (Summer 2007), 275–302.
- "Strategic Maneuvering through Persuasive Definitions: Implications for Dialectic and Rhetoric," Argumentation, 20 (2006), 399–416.
- "The U.S. and the World: Unexpressed Premises of American Exceptionalism," Proceedings of the Sixth Conference of the International Society for the Study of Argumentation (Amsterdam: Sic Sat, 2007), 1567–1571.
- Sizing Up Rhetoric, co-edited with Elizabeth Benacka (Long Grove, IL: Waveland Press, 2008).
- Public Speaking: Strategies for Success, 5th ed. (Boston: Allyn and Bacon, 2008).
