= Susan Jarratt =

American professor of rhetoric

- Occupation: English Professor

Academic background
- Education: University of Texas at Austin

Academic work
- Discipline: Rhetoric
- Institutions: Miami University University of California, Irvine
- Main interests: Sophistic Rhetoric, Women's Rhetoric

Susan Jarratt is professor emerita of Comparative Literature at the University of California, Irvine. Her interests include ancient Greek and Roman rhetoric, feminist theory, historiography, and contemporary rhetoric and writing. She is known for her work to recover the discourse theories of the sophists. Jarratt served as editor of Rhetoric Society Quarterly, the journal of the Rhetoric Society of America. She is a past president of the American Society for the History of Rhetoric.

== Biography ==
Jarratt taught high school English in San Antonio, Texas. She went on to earn her Ph.D. at the University of Texas at Austin, studying under James Kinneavy. She taught at Miami University before moving to University of California, Irvine.

== Publications ==
Her publications include Rereading the Sophists: Classical Rhetoric Refigured (1991) and "Classics and Counterpublics in Nineteenth-Century Historically Black Colleges" (2009), which won the NCTE Richard C. Ohmann Award for Outstanding Article in College English. She also co-edited the book Feminism and Composition Studies: In Other Words (1998) with Lynn Worsham.

== See also ==
- Edward Schiappa
- John Poulakos
