= Cheryl Glenn (academic) =

American academic researching women's rhetoric and writing practices

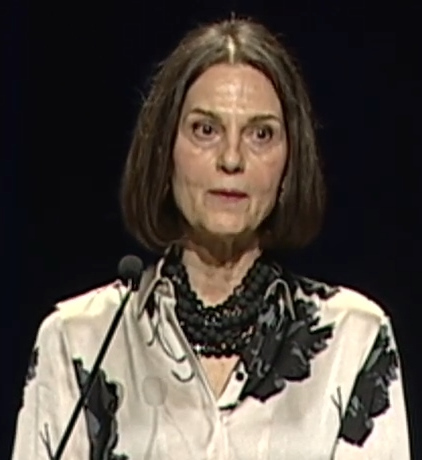
Glenn in 2019

Cheryl Glenn is a scholar and teacher of rhetoric and writing. She is currently Distinguished Professor of English and Women’s Studies Director at Pennsylvania State University.

Glenn earned her B.S., M.A., and PhD. from Ohio State University. Prior to beginning work at Pennsylvania State University in 1997, Glenn taught at Oregon State University established the Center for Teaching Excellence. In the summers, she teaches rhetoric and writing at the Bread Loaf School of English, an intensive six-week graduate school for secondary-school teachers, and has served as the on-site director of the Santa Fe campus.

== Scholarship ==
Glenn works on women’s rhetorics and writing practices, feminist theories and practices, methods for teaching writing. She has written on marginalized voices, the power of silence, and problems of inequity in rhetorical education.

Together with J. Michael Hogan, she co-edits the Penn State University Press series, “Rhetoric and Democratic Deliberation”; and with Shirley Wilson Logan, co-edits the Southern Illinois University Press series, “Studies in Rhetorics and Feminisms.”

== Leadership positions ==
Glenn has been President of the Coalition of Women Scholars in the History of Rhetoric and Composition and as a Chair of the Modern Language Association (MLA) Division on the History and Theory of Rhetoric and Composition. She is also a member of the Conference on College Composition and Communication (CCCC) Executive Committee and the MLA Delegate Assembly., and served as the Chair of the 59th annual Conference on College Composition and Communication in 2008. Additionally, she is a John Moore Teaching Mentor and co-founder of Penn State’s Center for Democratic Deliberation.

== Fellowships/awards ==
Glenn has earned three fellowships from the National Endowment for the Humanities (NEH) and has won numerous research, scholarship, teaching, and mentoring awards. Among these are the Conference on College Composition and Communication’s Richard Braddock Award, Rhetoric Review’s Outstanding Essay Award, Best Book/Honorable Mention from the Society for the Study of Early Modern Women, and the 2009 Rhetorician of the Year Award.

== Selected publications ==
=== Books ===
- Rhetorical Feminism and This Thing Called Hope. Southern Illinois, 2018
- Landmark Essays on Rhetoric and Feminism: 1973-2000 (Landmark Essays Series). Routledge, 2014
- Silence and Listening as Rhetorical Arts. Southern Illinois UP, 2011
- Rhetorical Education In America. University Alabama Press, 2009
- Unspoken: A Rhetoric of Silence. Southern Illinois UP, 2004
- Rhetoric Retold: Regendering the Tradition from Antiquity Through the Renaissance. Southern Illinois UP, 1997
