= Rhetoric Society of America =

Organization

The Rhetoric Society of America (RSA) is an academic organization for the study of rhetoric.

== Background ==
The Society's constitution calls for it to research rhetoric in all relevant fields of study, identify new areas of study, encourage experimentation in teaching rhetoric, facilitate professional cooperation and to sponsor the publication of such materials dealing with rhetoric." The Society is composed of scholars from various disciplines who study rhetoric's history, theory, public practice, and pedagogical methods.

The RSA was established in 1968, by directors that included Edward P. J. Corbett, Wayne C. Booth and Richard Hughes, introducing innovative programs and courses in rhetoric.

In 2008, the American Council of Learned Societies (ACLS) accepted the Rhetoric Society of America as its 70th member learned society. The learned societies of ACLS are national or international organizations in the humanities and related social sciences, accepted on the basis of their "substantial, distinctive, and distinguished contribution" to humanistic scholarship.

In her book Authoring a Discipline: Scholarly Journals and the Post-World War II Emergence of Rhetoric and Composition, Maureen Daly Goggin writes that:

Much like RTE [Rhetorical Task Examination], the RSQ [Rhetoric Society Quarterly] helped to train those new to rhetoric in the kinds of research traditions that offered a currency and purchasing power to raise the professional and disciplinary status of the field. In the process, it helped to establish a social network of scholars, thus strengthening the disciplinary fabric of the field. In other words, like the promoters of the RTE, the members of the RSA and its journal provided both an institutional forum and intellectual traditions that had the potential to galvanize the emerging discipline of rhetoric and composition within departments of English.

== Publications ==
The Rhetoric Society Quarterly is the organization's official journal. Published four times a year, it features original articles on all areas of rhetorical studies, intended for an interdisciplinary audience of scholars and students who work in communication studies, English studies, philosophy, politics and other fields. It awards its Charles Kneupper Award for the best article of the year. An associate professor at the University of Texas at Arlington, Kneupper organized the society's national conferences until his death in 1989.

The Society also operates the Blogora, a blog for "connecting rhetoric, rhetorical methods and theories, and rhetoricians with public life," hosted by the University of Texas at Austin.

== Current and past presidents ==
- Lisa A. Flores (2026-2028)
- Gwendolyn Pough (2024-2026)
- Vanessa Beasley (2022-2024)
- Michelle Ballif (2020-2022)
- Kirt H. Wilson (2018-2020)
- Gregory Clark (2016-2018)
- Kendall Phillips (2014-2015)
- Krista Ratcliffe (2012-2013)
- David Zarefsky (2010–2011)
- Michael C. Leff (2010-2011)
- Jack Selzer (2008-2009)
- David Zarefsky (2006–2007)
- Patricia Bizzell (2004–2005)
- Gerald A. Hauser (2002–2003)
- Frederick Antczak (2000-2001)
- C. Jan Swearingen (1998-1999)
- Carolyn R. Miller (1996-1997)
- Kathleen Welch (1994-1993)
- S. Michael Halloran (1992-1993)
- Richard Leo Enos (1990-1991)
- Winifred Bryan Horner (1988-1989)
- Edward P.J. Corbett (1972-1976; Board Chair 1976-1987)
- J. Carter Rowland (1968)
