= Elizabeth Nyamayaro =

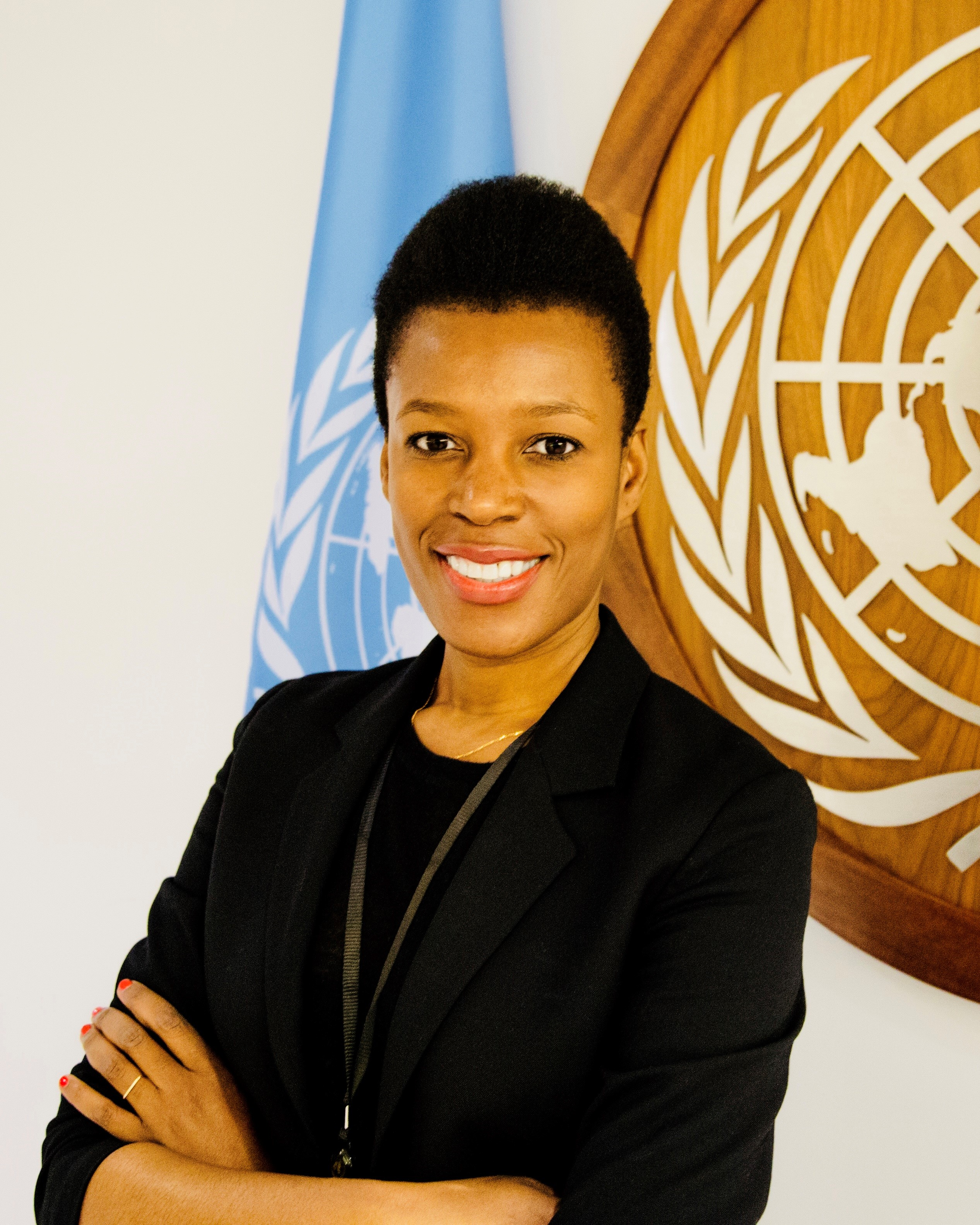
- Born: August 15, 1975 (age 51); Zimbabwe
- Education: London School of Economics and Political Science
- Occupations: Senior Advisor, United Nations
- Known for: TED Talk: An invitation to men who want a better world for women
- Movement: HeForShe

Elizabeth Nyamayaro (born August 15, 1975) is a political scientist and former senior advisor to Under-Secretary-General and executive director for UN Women. Nyamayaro is also the head of HeForShe, a movement founded by UN Women to empower all humans, especially men and boys, to have a voice and take action to achieve gender equality in their own lifetime.

== Early life and education ==
Nyamayaro was born to a Zambian mother and is one of four children. She was raised by her grandmother in a village in Zimbabwe ridden with HIV and famine. Rather than attending school, she did household chores and looked for food wherever she could. After a drought in the eighties left her village famished, Nyamayaro encountered UNICEF for the first time. This was the first time famine hit in her community and she benefited from U.N. aid workers feeding her from time to time. After that experience, it became her goal to work for the United Nations and help and uplift others like she had been helped. It was after the first famine that her family was divided and she stayed with her grandmother while her parents, brother, and two sisters went to the capital of Harare to look for work and opportunity. When she was 10 years old, her aunt had enough money to bring her to the capital of Harare and attend a private school with British kids which was her first time in school. This was a defining moment in her life as she experienced inequality for the first time because she did not fit in at school but she also felt superior to her village as she was now more educated.

She left Zimbabwe when she was 21 to attend a small college in Notting Hill Gate, London. After living in London and Geneva, Nyamayaro now resides in New York City.

Nyamayaro received her MSc in Politics from the London School of Economics and Political Science.

Nyamayaro also attended Harvard Business School.

== Career ==
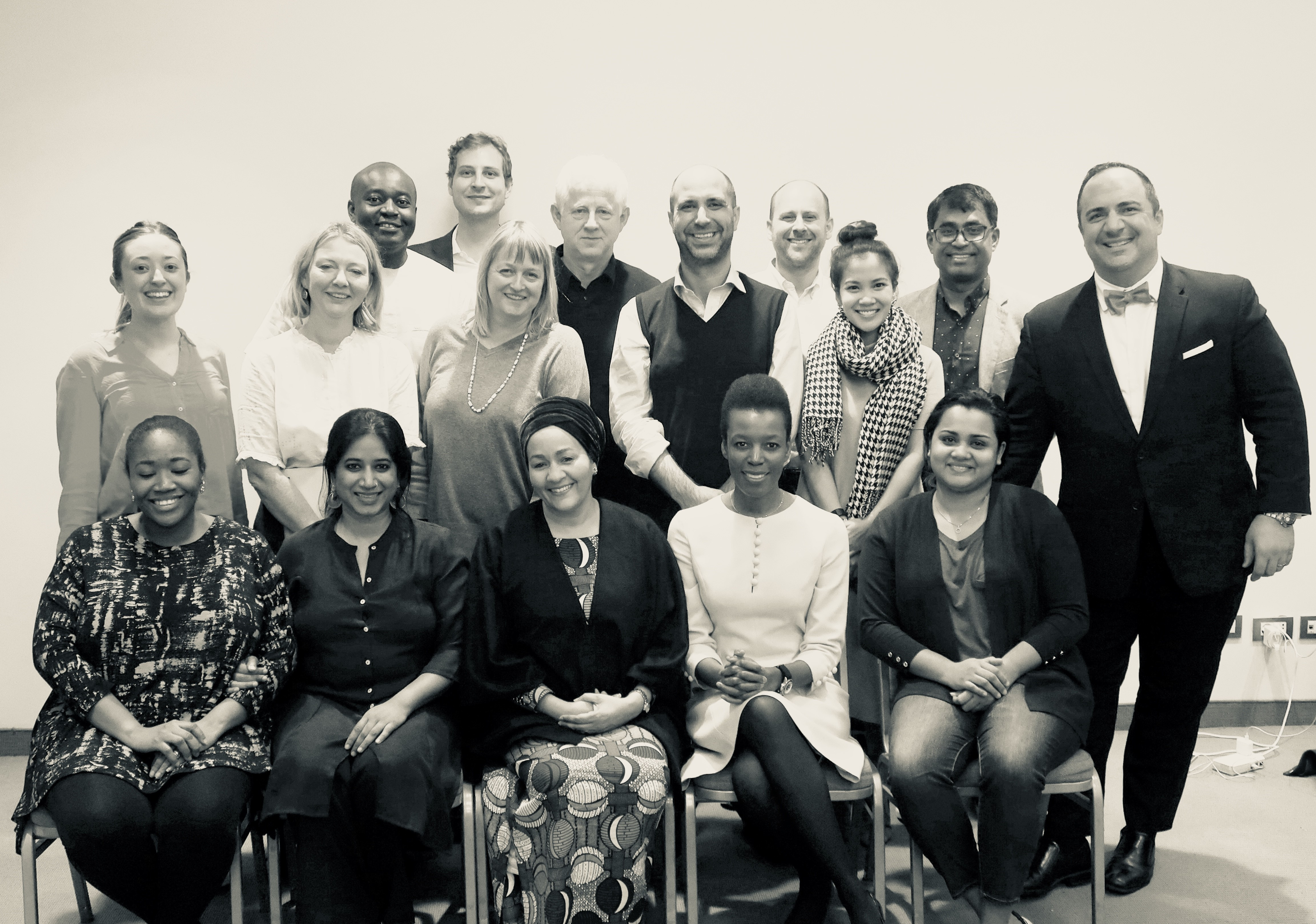

Currently, Nyamayaro is a senior advisor to Under Secretary-General and executive director for UN Women and the head HeForShe Movement. Nyamayaro's first partnership for UN Women was bringing on actress and activist Emma Watson to be the face of the HeForShe Movement.

Prior to her work for UN Women, Nyamayaro worked for Merck, one of the largest pharmaceutical companies in the world. As part of the Senior Leadership within the Corporate Strategy Office at Merck, she worked to continue Merck's vision of broadening access to medicine in developing countries. She also focused on and launched key women's initiatives including "Merck for Mothers," a $500 million commitment to reduce maternal mortality, "Saving Mothers, Giving Life", an initiative with the US Government and then- Secretary of State Hillary Clinton focusing on maternal health and lastly, "Pink Ribbon Red Ribbon Alliance" which partnered with the George W. Bush Institute, UNAIDS, Susan G. Komen and PEPFAR to aid in cervical cancer prevention.

In the past 15 years, Nyamayaro has held positions at UNAIDS, the World Health Organization and the World Bank. There, she worked to support public health initiatives. In both the public and private sector, Nyamayaro has worked at the forefront of Africa's development for more than a decade.

In May 2015, Nyamayaro filmed a TED Talk for TEDWomen titled, "An invitation to men who want a better world for women." As of March 2016, her TED Talk has gotten 1,240,141 views.

Additionally, she founded Africa IQ, a nonprofit that aims to contribute to Africa's economic growth and development.

Nyamayaro is an advocate of Ubuntu philosophy.

== Awards ==
- Nominated for New African Woman Award in Civil Society

== See also ==
- UN Women
- HeForShe
