= Patricia Bizzell =

American academic

Patricia Bizzell is a professor of English, emerita, and former Chairperson of the English Department at the College of the Holy Cross, United States, where she taught from 1978 to 2019. Bizzell is the 2008 winner of the CCCC Exemplar Award, and is a former president of Rhetoric Society of America.

== Areas of Scholarly Focus ==
Bizzell's research interests include the question of how the increasing diversification of academic discourses affects the teaching of writing to college students, with a special focus on students that she terms "basic writers." Bizzell, throughout her career, has focused on students coming from traditionally disadvantaged economic and social backgrounds in order to study how rhetoric and composition can be effectively taught to students coming from a diverse range of backgrounds.

Bizzell is also the subject of a profile chapter in Women's Ways of Making It in Rhetoric and Composition, edited by Michelle Balliff, Diane Davis, and Roxanne Mountford. The book aims to share both the successes and failures of women in the field of rhetoric and composition, with the aim of inspiring other women to enter the field. The book covers a range of topics from encountering sexism in the workplace and balancing a career and family life, issues that are further addressed in the chapter on Bizzell.

== Scholarship ==
In Academic Discourse and Critical Consciousness, Bizzell traces her experiences as of teaching first-year college composition courses. The essays, written over a number of years, come together to provide insights into how her teaching and thinking about pedagogy have changed over the years. Compiling the essays in this way traces a trajectory of how thinking about and implementing teaching practices have evolved for Bizzell over her number of years of experience. The essay collection has an extensive focus on what happens when students from diverse backgrounds are asked to use language in specific ways in college classrooms, tracing practices and pedagogies that have been successful in her own classrooms over the years.

Bizzell's article "Cognition, Convention, and Certainty: What We Need to Know About Writing" explores the relationship between students' ability to engage in thoughtful contemplation and their writing abilities. The relationship between thought and language, according to Bizzell, needs to be given more careful consideration in the composition classroom. It is only by helping students learn to frame their thinking that teachers can help them to be productive and successful writers.

"What Happens When Basic Writers Come to College?" tries to answer one of the research questions that seems to be most central to Bizzell's research. This article examines what happens when students with diverse backgrounds, dialects, and class standings come together in a college composition classroom. Bizzell, using her own teaching experience as part of her research, delves into how these students can find success in college classrooms and settings.

== Professional experience ==
=== Teaching positions ===
- Chair, Department of English, College of the Holy Cross, 2001-2005
- Professor of English, Holy Cross, 1988–present: composition, rhetoric, American Literature
- Director, English Honors Program, 1999-2000
- Director, College Honors Program, 1994-1998
- Director, Writing Programs, 1981-1994 (Writer's Workshop and Writing-across-the-Curriculum Program)
- Associate Professor, Holy Cross, 1981-1988
- Assistant Professor, Holy Cross, 1978–81
- Assistant Professor, Rutgers University, 1975–78, and Director, Remedial Writing Program, 1975–77, and Teacher Training Program, 1977–78

=== Professional affiliations and activities ===
- President, Rhetoric Society of America, 2004-2006
- Program Chair, RSA 2004 biennial national conference
- President, Board of Directors, Alliance of Rhetoric Societies, 2006 (ARS)

=== Academic background ===
- Ph.D. in English Literature, Rutgers University, 1975.
- B.A. summa cum laude, Wellesley College, 1970.
- Enrolled in the M.J.L.S. (Masters, Jewish Liberal Studies) program at Hebrew College

== Prizes and external grants received ==
- Winner, National Council of Teachers of English Outstanding Book Award, 1992, for The Rhetorical Tradition: Readings from Classical Times to the Present (co-authored with Bruce Herzberg).
- Winner, National Council of Writing Program Administrators Best Book Award, 2000, for Coming of Age: The Advanced Writing Curriculum, eds. Linda Shamoon, Sandra Jamieson, Rebecca Howard, and Robert Schwegler, which included Bizzell's essay "Writing as a Means of Social Change".

== Books published ==
- Bizzell, Patricia (1992). Academic Discourse and Critical Consciousness. Pittsburgh: University of Pittsburgh Press. p. 295. ISBN 0-8229-5485-0.
- Bizzell, Patricia; Herzberg, Bruce (1995). Negotiating Difference: Readings in Multicultural American Rhetoric. Boston: Bedford Books of St. Martin's Press. p. 963. ISBN 0-312-06846-8. (Alternate title: Negotiating Difference: Cultural Case Studies for Composition)
- Bizzell, Patricia; Herzberg, Bruce (2001). Rhetorical Tradition: Readings from Classical Times to the Present, The (2nd ed.; 1st ed. 1990 ed.). Boston: Bedford Books of St. Martin's Press. p. 1673. ISBN 0-312-14839-9.
- Bizzell, Patricia; Schroeder, Christopher; Fox, Helen, eds. (2002). ALT DIS: Alternative Discourses and the Academy. Portsmouth, New Hampshire: Heinemann-Boynton/Cook. p. 224. ISBN 0-86709-516-4.
- Bizzell, Patricia; Herzberg, Bruce; Reynolds, Nedra (2003). The Bedford Bibliography for Teachers of Writing (6th ed.). Boston: Bedford Books of St. Martin's Press. p. 275. ISBN 0-312-40501-4.
- Bizzell, Patricia, ed. (2005). Rhetorical Agendas: Political, Ethical, Spiritual [Proceedings of the 2004 Rhetoric Society of America Conference]. Mahwah, New Jersey: Lawrence Erlbaum Associates. p. 400. ISBN 0-8058-5311-1.
- Bizzell, Patricia; Herzberg, Bruce; Hacker, Diana (2005). Negotiating Difference & Pocket Style Manual 4e (Package ed.). Boston: Bedford Books of St. Martin's Press. ISBN 0-312-45814-2.
- Bizzell, Patricia; Herzberg, Bruce; Barnet, Sylvan; Badau, Hugo (2006). Rhetorical Tradition 2e & From Critical Thinking to Argument (Package ed.). Boston: Bedford Books of St. Martin's Press. ISBN 0-312-46336-7.
- Bizzell, Patricia; Lunsford, Andrea A.; Herzberg, Bruce (2006). St. Martin's Handbook 5e with 2003 MLA Update & Exercises CD-ROM & Negotiating Difference (Hardcover). Boston: Bedford Books of St. Martin's Press. ISBN 0-312-46021-X.
