= Karlyn Kohrs Campbell =

American academic (1937–2024)

Karlyn Kohrs Campbell (April 16, 1937 – December 23, 2024) was an American academic specializing in rhetorical criticism at the University of Minnesota.

== Background ==
Campbell was born on April 16, 1937, near Blomkest, Minnesota. She attended Willmar High School and graduated with a Bachelor of Arts from Macalester College, St. Paul, in 1958. She earned a Master of Arts (1959) and a Ph.D. (1968) from the University of Minnesota. Campbell died on December 23, 2024 following complications from Alzheimer's, at the age of 87.

== Professional life ==
Campbell has taught at the State University of New York at Brockport; the British College in Palermo, Sicily; Macalester College; California State University, Los Angeles; the State University of New York at Binghamton, the University of Kansas, Lawrence, where she was director of the women’s studies program; and at the University of Minnesota, where she chaired the Department of Communication Studies for nine years. She also edited the Quarterly Journal of Speech for three years. She was a fellow at the Joan Shorenstein Center on the Press, Politics, and Public Policy at Harvard Kennedy School in 1992.

== Theoretical contributions ==
Karlyn Kohrs Campbell was a professor at the University of Minnesota where she taught courses such as Seminar in Rhetorical Criticism, Intro to Rhetorical Criticism, and Rhetoric of Feminism. Her specialties included women in communication, rhetorical theory and criticism, presidential rhetoric, and political campaigns. One of her most famous works in which she incorporated her rhetorical ideas is Agency: Promiscuous and Protean. In this essay, she attempts to proclaim the meanings of agency by referencing Sojourner Truth at the 1851 woman's rights convention. This is just one of the many examples in which she incorporates her interest in feminism and feminist rhetoric into her own works.

Another significant work Campbell contributed to is Deeds Done in Words: Presidential Rhetoric and the Genre of Governance, which was co-written with Kathleen Hall Jamieson and published in 1990. In 2008, a contemporary, updated edition called Presidents Creating the Presidency: Deeds Done in Words was published. In these two works, Campbell and Jamieson create a monumental framework for analyzing the rhetoric surrounding presidential oratory. They argue that the presidency is defined by what the president says and how they say it. Through the framework that Campbell and Jamieson create, they describe the different situations and actions in which presidents operate, such as inaugural addresses, special inaugural addresses in the ascension of a vice president, national eulogies, pardoning rhetoric, state of the union addresses, veto messages, the signing statement as the de facto item veto, presidential war rhetoric, presidential rhetoric of self-defense, and the rhetoric of impeachment. This work covers all the presidents up to George W. Bush.

Campbell and Jamieson argue that presidential discourse has had multiple demands of audience, occasion, and institution and in the process of either satisfying or failing, political capital and presidential authority is either supplemented from or depleted to the other branches of government. The original work of Deeds Done in Words: Presidential Rhetoric and Genre of Governance was updated to address new developments such as the ever-evolving rhetorical strategies and technological advancements in media.

== Awards ==
Kohrs Campbell is the recipient of numerous awards for her distinguished work including the Francine Merritt Award for contributions to women, and the University of Minnesota Distinguished Woman Scholar Award. She also has received the NCA’s Donald H. Ecroyd Award for Outstanding Teaching in Higher Education, the National Communication Association Distinguished Scholar Award, the Ehninger Award for Distinguished Rhetorical Scholarship, the Winans-Wichelns Book Award, and the Charles Woolbert Award for Scholarship of Exceptional Quality. Due to her success, the Karlyn Kohrs Campbell Award is presented to the author(s) of the Top Paper submitted to the Rhetorical Theory and Criticism Interest Group at the Central States Communication Association Convention.
