= HeForShe =

Solidarity movement for the advancement of gender equality

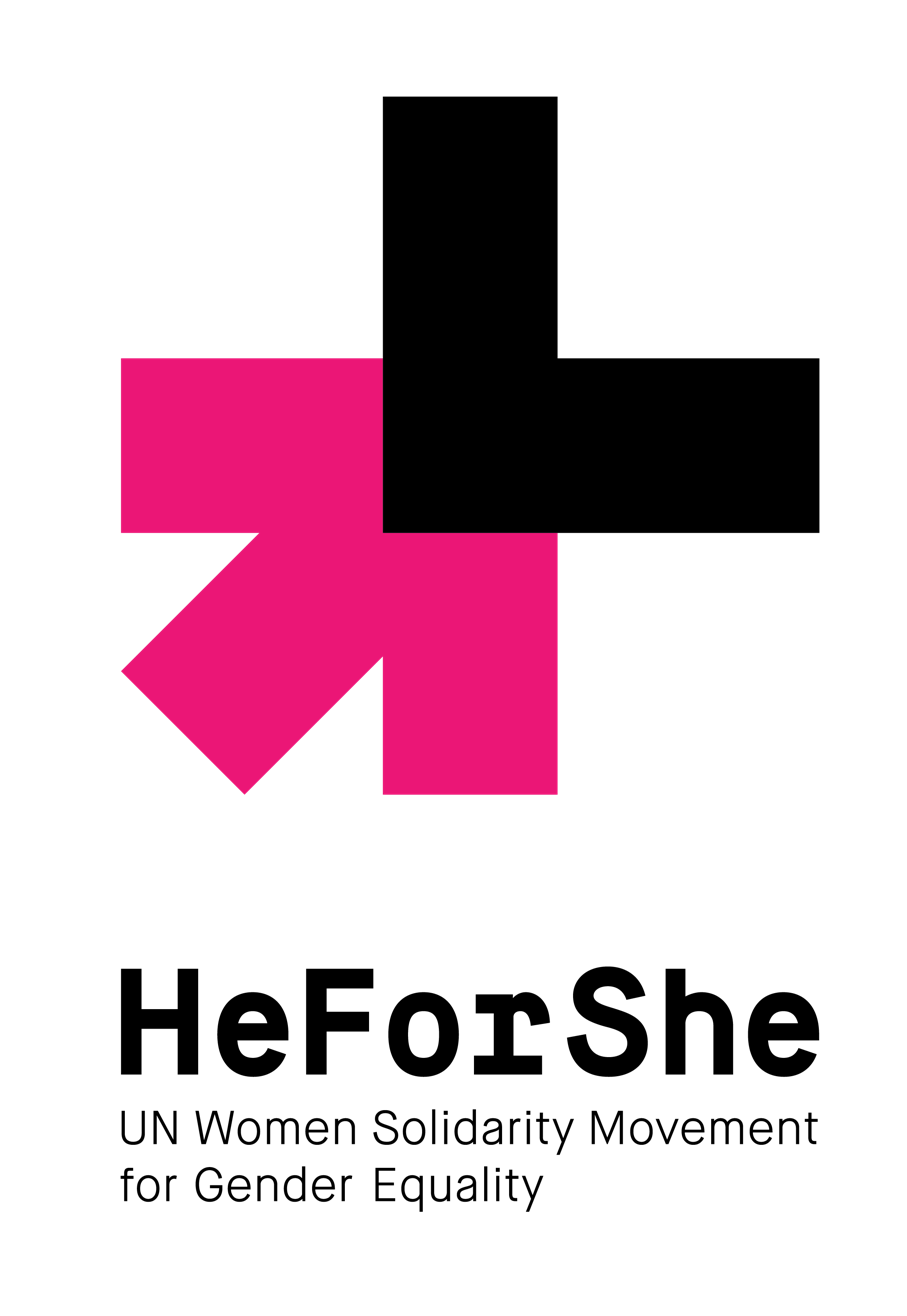
- Formation: 20 September 2014
- Founder: UN Women
- Key people: Emma Watson; Elizabeth Nyamayaro; Winston Duke; Édgar Ramírez
- Parent organisation: UN Women
- Website: heforshe.org

HeForShe, referred to as He for She, is a solidarity movement for the advancement of gender equality initiated by the United Nations. Grounded in the idea that gender inequality is an issue that affects all people, socially, economically and politically, HeForShe is a global effort that seeks to involve men and boys in achieving equality by taking action against negative gender stereotypes and behaviors. Its logo represents the union of women and men working together to achieve gender equality, by joining together aspects of both the female and male symbols.

Since its launch at the United Nations on 20 September 2014 by UN Secretary-General Ban Ki-moon and English actress Emma Watson (who was appointed UN Women Global Goodwill Ambassador), millions of men from around the world, including Heads of State, CEOs, and global luminaries, have committed to gender equality. On the HeForShe website, a geo-locating map records the global engagement of the movement through counting the number of men and women around the world who have taken a pledge for the HeForShe initiative, registering over 2.1 million online commitments worldwide.

When launching the movement in September 2014, Watson delivered an address at the United Nations Headquarters in New York City, mainly focusing on the personal and professional motivation for establishing HeForShe. The speech went viral, amassing millions of views on YouTube.

HeForShe illustrates the need for male allyship by pointing to studies that show 257 more years will be necessary to close the gender gap, and that 95% of the world's CEOs and heads of states are men. They argue the commitment of men with power and privilege can be a major factor for gender equality, and hope that the human stories as well as scalable, proven solutions will provide a roadmap to progress and help to shape the men's movement for gender equality.

== History ==
A special event was held to start the HeForShe movement on 20 September 2014 at the headquarters of the United Nations in New York City. It was hosted by UN Women Goodwill Ambassador Emma Watson, whose speech about her call to involve men and boys in promoting gender equality was widely circulated via social media. The video of the launch has over 11 million online views and there were 1.1 million #HeForShe tweets by more than 750,000 different users within two weeks. The launch was named by Twitter as a catalytic moment of 2014 and painted the hashtag on its wall in its HQ.

At that event, UN Women made a call to mobilize the first 100,000 men in the movement, a goal successfully reached in just three days. Former United States President Barack Obama, actor Matt Damon, singer Harry Styles, and UN Secretary-General António Guterres are among some of the high-profile males featured on the site. As of July 2020, over 220 000 people have committed online in India, 200 000 in Rwanda, 170 000 in the Democratic Republic of Congo, 150 000 in the US and 130 000 in Mexico.

HeForShe was launched by UN Women's Executive Director Phumzile Mlambo-Ngcuka and led by her former Senior Advisor Elizabeth Nyamayaro until 2019. Since then, HeForShe has been led by Edward Wageni, former director of Save The Children International Kenya.

== Initiatives ==
=== Global Leaders as role models ===
On 23 January 2015, UN Women launched the HeForShe IMPACT 10x10x10 initiative to gain further momentum in advancing gender equality and women's empowerment at the 2015 World Economic Forum in Davos. Global leaders serving as the founding champions include former H.E. President Ernest Bai Koroma of Sierra Leone; H.E. Prime Minister Stefan Löfvén of Sweden; Paul Polman, former CEO of Unilever; Rick Goings, former chairman and CEO of Tupperware Brands Corporation.

In 2016, the Thematic Champions initiative was launched to engage further global leaders, who make gender equality an institutional priority by implementing one bold, game-changing commitments to advance and achieve gender equality. As of July 2020, the Thematic Champions included Justin Trudeau, PM from Canada; Jean-Laurent Bonnafé, CEO of BNP Paribas; Bruce Cleaver, CEO from De Beers Group.

As part of these initiatives, HeForShe has been holding an annual summit since 2015, where global HeForShe Champions from both initiatives and other high-profile people present their gender equality solutions to the world.

While the HeForShe 2019 Impact Report found that there is still a wage gap between men and women, business, universities, and other entities that participate in the initiative have contributed to a dynamic shift in gender parity in terms of representation in senior leadership positions.

==== Parity in Global Leadership ====
The HeForShe Proven Solution on How to Achieve Parity in Global Leadership was produced as several HeForShe Champions' organisations including Price Waterhouse Coopers, World Bank, McKinsey & Company whom all have increased female representation in their global leadership team, setting out a roadmap for other organizations.

==== Male Allies Guide ====
The HeForShe Male Allies Guide for Gender Equality – Tips for Understanding and Managing Your Emotions, was built on a programme pioneered by the Government of Finland, a HeForShe IMPACT Champion, to enlist army conscripts to prevent violence against women.

=== Campaigns and initiatives ===
==== Campaigns ====
To raise awareness on gender equality challenges such as mental load, gender-based violence and discrimination, and to engage men in the conversation, HeForShe holds on a regular basis campaigns on social media alongside the in-person global campaigns. These include What We Share Is More Powerful Than What Divides Us, #MorePowerfulTogether, #YearOfMaleAllyship and #HeForSheAtHome.

===== #MorePowerfulTogether =====
Launched in September 2018, the #MorePowerfulTogether campaign invited landmarks around the world, most notably The Empire State Building in New York City, the Burj Khalifa in Dubai, and the CN Tower in Toronto, to turn off half their lights to demonstrate the power lost when women are underrepresented from society, economies and communities.

===== #HeForSheAtHome =====
As a response to the COVID-19 pandemic, as gender inequalities, particularly of women in the home, became increasingly apparent when it comes to housework, cleaning and caring for children, the sick or the elderly, HeForShe launched the #HeForSheAtHome campaign to inspire men to help balance the burden in their households. In sharing the stories of positive male role models sharing the work at home from all over the world, #HeForSheAtHome seeks to inspire many more to do their fair share and to reduce women's mental load.

==== Country-level initiatives ====
HeForShe Taverns have been set up throughout South Africa to initiate conversations with men about engaging with women without being abusive in taverns, as they are mostly men-dominated. Further HeForShe Equality Stories include boys and men cycling through rural India to shift positively traditional gender norms, and boys and men redefining masculinity in Jordan. Students engage very much, as a #GetFree tour was organised throughout universities to initiative gender equality ideas in North America, and over 100 HeForShe student clubs are active worldwide. The Civil Society is able to engage via the online HeForShe Action Kit.

==== HeForShe in Sports ====
HeForShe has been partnering with numerous organisations to advance gender equality in sports, including the Valencia Club de Fútbol, one of Europe's major football teams and Fenerbahçe Sports Club, one of Turkey's most popular sports club. The HeForShe Champions also engage by raising awareness on gender equality through their own sports events such as the Danone Nations Cup and the BNP Paribas Tennis Open.

=== HeForShe Alliance ===
On September 23, 2021, HeForShe announced the launch of the HeForShe Alliance, signifying a new era of commitment to action following the footsteps of the Generation Equality Forum.

== Criticism ==
=== Rhetorical criticism ===
The rhetoric around violence and inequality against women, specifically in instances of assault, has many activists claiming that the responsibility is shifted from perpetrator to victim. Watson's speech focuses on the way men can play an active role in advancing political, economic, and social equality of the sexes. Watson's speech was criticized for focusing only on women and ignoring sexist biases against men and reinforce the very inequality it is trying to erase. Watson's heavy emphasis on women's dependence on men's support lead to criticisms that HeForShe grants men the leading role in the campaign, reinforcing and perpetuating gender inequality.

=== Feminist criticism ===
Although HeForShe has actively represented LGBTQ+ issues alongside sister campaign United Nations Free & Equal, some have expressed concerns that the name of the movement leaves behind non-binary, transgender, and genderqueer individuals, and reinforcement of the gender binary.

Watson was also criticized by other feminists for being privileged, wealthy, and white, yet speaking on behalf of women who do not fit into that category. More criticism by feminists followed after Watson delivered her speech. One criticism, published in The New York Times, was due to the name of the campaign, HeForShe, and Watson asking men to pledge to take action against all forms of violence and discrimination faced by women and girls, yet without elaborating on the problems affecting men and boys. The name of the campaign was also criticized due to the implication that men should not care about feminism because it may improve things for them, but rather, they should care about feminism because it will improve things for women, and that men were being painted as the saviors of women.

=== Response to criticism ===
In an interview with Elle, Watson responded to the criticisms of other feminists, stating that "It's difficult to hear criticism from people you consider your peers and who you believe are on the same side." She responded by saying that the term "feminism" has become more associated with "man-hating" than gender equality and further states that gender inequality affects both men and women due to gender stereotypes and that it is a human rights issue. Watson also asserts that the HeforShe campaign will strengthen the feminist cause by involving both women and men around the globe in advocating for gender equality.

== See also ==
- Women's rights
- UN Women
