= Richard Enos =

Richard Leo Enos is an American rhetorician noted for his contributions to the history of rhetoric. Since the 1970s he has promoted primary research on rhetoric by examination of archaeological materials and epigraphical evidence.

He spent the latter part of his career in the Department of English at Texas Christian University, where he was Piper Professor and held the Lillian Radford Chair of Rhetoric and Composition; he retired in 2019.

== Publications ==
Authored books

- R. L. Enos. Roman Rhetoric: Revolution and the Greek influence (Waveland Press; 1995; Parlor Press; 2008); 71 citations in Google Scholar
- R. L. Enos. Greek Rhetoric before Aristotle (1993; Parlor Press; 2012); 234 citations in Google Scholar

Edited books

- R. L. Enos, R. Thompson, eds. The Rhetoric of St. Augustine of Hippo: "De Doctrina Christiana" and the Search for a Distinctly Christian Rhetoric. (Baylor University Press; 2008)
- R. L. Enos, L. P. Agnew, eds. Landmark Essays on Aristotelian Rhetoric (Hermagoras Press; 1998)
- R. L. Enos, ed. Oral and Written Communication: Historical Approaches (Sage; 1990)

Papers

- R. L. Enos (1976). The epistemology of Gorgias' rhetoric: A re‐examination. Southern Speech Communication Journal 42 (1): 35–51; doi:10.1080/10417947609372331; 87 citations in Google Scholar
