= Craig J Saper =

Craig Saper is a professor of language, Literacy, & Culture at the University of Maryland Baltimore County (UMBC).

Saper is the author of Amazing Adventures of Bob Brown (2016), Intimate Bureaucracies: A Manifesto (2012), Networked Art (2001), and Artificial Mythologies (1997).

Saper has published articles on a wide range of topics including electracy, cultural theory, film and media, digital publishing, visual culture, and mail art. He has edited several anthologies and special issues including Electracy: Gregory L. Ulmer's Textshop Experiments; Imaging Place with John Craig Freeman and Will Garrett-Petts; Drifts, a special issue of Rhizomes: Cultural Studies in Emerging Knowledge; "Mapping Culture Multimodally" from the journal Hyperrhiz; and "Instant Theory: Making Theory Popular", a special issue of the journal Visible Language.

In 2014, he founded an artist collective that re-ignited Roving Eye Press, a small press started by Bob Brown. Saper was invited to write new introductions for the first series published by the press. In 2016, Saper published the first biography of Brown.

From 2012 to 2015, Saper served as Bearman Foundation Chair in Entrepreneurship at UMBC. He has previously taught at The University of Central Florida; the University of Pennsylvania; The University of the Arts in Philadelphia; and Indiana University, Bloomington.

== Bibliography ==
=== Books ===
- Amazing Adventures of Bob Brown: A Real-life Zelig Who Wrote His Way Through the 20th Century (Fordham University Press, 2016)
- Intimate Bureaucracies: A Manifesto (Punctum Books, 2012)
- Networked Art (University of Minnesota Press, 2001)
- Artificial Mythologies: A Guide to Cultural Invention (University of Minnesota Press, 1997)

=== Edited collections ===
- Electracy: Gregory L. Ulmer's Textshop Experiments by Gregory L. Ulmer, co-edited with Victor J. Vitanza (The Davies Group, Publishers, 2015)
- 1450-1950 by Bob Brown (Roving Eye Press, 2015)
- Gems: A Censored Anthology by Bob Brown (Roving Eye Press, 2015)
- Words by Bob Brown (Rice University Press, 2009; Roving Eye Press, 2014)
- The Readies by Bob Brown (Rice University Press, 2009; Roving Eye Press, 2014)

=== Multimedia projects ===
- Growing Folkvine: Florida's Art & Artists on the Web with Kristin G. Congdon & Lynn Tomlinson (University of Central Florida, 2007)

=== Art exhibition catalogues and pamphlets ===
- Typebound : books as sculpture, from Florida collections; typewriter poems, from the Sackner Archives of Concrete and Visual Poetry (University of Central Florida, 2009)
- Networking Artists & Poets: Assemblings from the Ruth & Marvin Sackner Archive of Concrete & Visual Poetry (University of Pennsylvania, 1997)
- On Being Read (Moonkosh Press, 1985)
