= Janice Lauer =

American scholar (1932–2021)

Janice M. Lauer Rice (November 18, 1932 - April 7, 2021) was an American scholar of composition, rhetoric, and linguistics. She was a founding member of the Rhetoric Society of America. She founded one of the first doctoral programs in rhetoric and composition at Purdue University in 1980. The Lauer Series in Rhetoric and Composition from Parlor Press is named in her honor, as well as the Rhetoric Society of America's Janice Lauer Fund for Graduate Student Support (now the Andrea Lunsford Travel Grant) and the Purdue Foundation Janice M. Lauer Dissertation Award.

== Biography ==
Lauer was born in Detroit, Michigan in 1932. She obtained a master's degree in English from St. Louis University and her doctorate from the University of Michigan. Walter J. Ong was one of Lauer's professors at St. Louis University. She then went to work at the University of Detroit, where, among others, she mentored James Porter.

In 1967, Lauer, together with Richard Young, Ross Winterowd, Edward P.J. Corbett, and George Yoos decided to create what would become the Rhetoric Society of America while at the Conference on College Composition and Communication. Lauer held regular summer seminars on current theories of teaching composition. Speakers for the seminar included Edward P.J. Corbett, Ross Winterowd, Richard Young, Walter Ong, James Moffett, James Kinneavy, Gordon Rohman, Louis Milic, Frank O'Hare, Janet Emig, Linda Flower, Louise Phelps, James Berlin, and Andrea Lunsford. These seminars shared current composition theories with a wide range of instructions.

In 1980, Lauer founded one of the first doctoral programs in rhetoric and composition at Purdue University in 1980. Working with Muriel Harris, she was instrumental in hiring Patricia Sullivan and James Berlin. She also directed the Cranbrook Writers Conference. Lauer was a professor at Purdue from 1980 until her retirement in 2003, directing 57 dissertations. She later served as the Coordinator of the Consortium of Rhetoric and Composition Doctoral Programs. She also served as an executive committee member of the National Council of Teachers of English and as a member of the Board of Directors of the Rhetoric Society of America. She was also president of the Aquinas Educational Foundation.

== Awards ==
- Honorary Doctorate of Humane Letters, St. Edward's University
- Exemplar Award 1998, Conference on College Composition and Communication
- Excellence in Education Award, Purdue's School of Liberal Arts
- Hopwood Award, University of Michigan
- George E. Yoos Distinguished Service Award 2008, Rhetoric Society of America

== Selected works ==
- Invention In Contemporary Rhetoric: Heuristic Procedures, University of Michigan, Ann Arbor, 1967.
- "Heuristics and Composition." College Composition and Communication 21.5 (1970): 396–404.
- Response to Ann E. Berthoff, "The Problem of Problem Solving," College Composition and Communication 23.2 (1972): 208–210.
- "The Teacher of Writing." College Composition and Communication 27.4 (1976): 341–343.
- "Toward a Metatheory of Heuristic Procedures." College Composition and Communication 30.3 (1979): 268–269.
- "The rhetorical approach: Stages of writing and strategies for writers." Eight approaches to teaching composition (1980): 53–64.
- "Doctoral Programs in Rhetoric." Rhetoric Society Quarterly 10.4 (1980): 190–194.
- "Writing as Inquiry: Some Questions for Teachers." College Composition and Communication 33.1 (1982): 89–93.
- (with Gene Montague and Andrea Lunsford) Four Worlds of Writing (1982).
- "Metatheories of Rhetoric: Past Pipers." fforum, ed. Patricia Stock, Boynton/Cook Publishers, 1983, 290–93.
- (with Joseph Comprone, Lisa Ede, Peter Elbow, Andrea Lunsford, and Richard Young) "Watson Conference Oral History# 3: The Breadth of Composition Studies: Professionalization and Interdisciplinarity." History, Reflection, and Narrative: The Professionalization of Composition (1963), 1983, 205–13.
- "Composition Studies: Dappled Discipline." Rhetoric Review 3.1 (1984): 20-29.
- "Issues in rhetorical invention." Essays on classical rhetoric and modern discourse (1984): 127-39.
- (with Ulla Connor) "Understanding Persuasive Essay Writing: Linguistic/Rhetorical Approach." Text: Interdisciplinary Journal for the Study of Discourse 5.4 (1985): 309-326.
- "Writing for Insight." Conversations in Composition." Proceedings of New Dimensions in Writing: The First Merrimack College Conference on Composition Instruction. Eds. Albert C. DeCiccio and Michael J. Rossi. North Andover, MA: Merrimack College, 1987.
- (with Ulla Connor) "Cross-Cultural Variation in Persuasive Student Writing." in Writing Across Languages and Cultures: Issues in Contrastive Rhetoric, ed. Alan Purves, Sage, 1988.
- "Instructional Practices: Toward an Integration." Focuses 1 (1988): 3-10.
- (with J. William Asher) Composition Research: Empirical Designs (1989).
- (with Andrea Lunsford) "The place of rhetoric and composition in doctoral studies." The Future of Doctoral Studies in English. Ed. Andrea Lunsford, Helene Moglen, and James F. Slevin. New York: MLA, 1989, 106-110.
- "Interpreting Student Writing." in Encountering Student Texts: Interpretive Issues in Reading Student Writing, ed. Bruce Lawson, Susan Sterr Ryan, and W. Ross Winterowd, NCTE, 1989, 121-129.
- (with John Nicholls, Ping Chung Cheung, and Michael Patshnick) "Individual Differences in Academic Motivation: Perceived Ability, Goals, Beliefs, and Values." Learning and Individual Differences 1.1 (1989): 63-84.
- (with John Nicholls, Ping Chung Cheung, Michael Patshnick, and T.A. Thorkildsen) "Can achievement motivation theory succeed with only one conception of success?" In F. Halisch & J. H. L. van den Bercken (Eds.), International perspectives on achievement and task motivation (pp. 187–208). Swets & Zeitlinger Publishers, 1989.
- A Note to "JAC" Readers. Journal of Advanced Composition 12.2 (1992): 421-422.
- A Response to "The History of Composition: Reclaiming Our Lost Generations." Journal of Advanced Composition 13.1 (1993): 252-254.
- (with Patricia Sullivan) "Validity and reliability as social constructions." Professional communication: The social perspective (1993): 163-176.
- "Rhetoric and composition studies: A multimodal discipline." Defining the new rhetorics 7 (1993).
- "Constructing a Doctoral Program in Rhetoric and Composition." Rhetoric Review 12.2 (1994): 392-397.
- "Persuasive writing on public issues." Composition in context: Essays in honor of Donald C. Stewart (1994): 62-72.
- (with Janet Atwill) "Refiguring rhetoric as an art: Aristotle’s concept of techne." Discourse studies in honor of James L. Kinneavy (1995): 25-40.
- "Issues and discursive practices." Feminine Principles and Women's Experience in American Composition and Rhetoric (1995): 353-360.
- "The Feminization of Rhetoric and Composition Studies?" Rhetoric Review 13.2 (1995): 276-286.
- (with Richard Leo Enos, Janet M. Atwill, Linda-Ferreira-Buckley, Cheryl Glenn, Roxanne Mountford, Jasper Neel, Edward Schiappa, Kathleen Welch, and Thomas Miller) "Octalog II: The (Continuing) Politics of Historiography." Rhetoric Review 1 (1997): 22-44.
- "Graduate students as active members of the profession: Some questions for mentoring." Publishing in rhetoric and composition (1997): 229-35.
- "Fundraising letters." Written discourse in philanthropic fund raising. Issues of language and rhetoric (1997): 101-108.
- "Some Questions for Mentoring." Publishing in Rhetoric and Composition (1997): 229.
- "Doctoral Program Reviews: Taking Charge." ADE Bulletin 119 (1998): 9-13.
- (with Shirley Rose) "Feminist methodology: Dilemmas for graduate researchers." Under Construction: Working at the Intersections of Composition Theory, Research, and Practice. Ed. Christine Farris and Chris M. Anson. Logan: Utah State UP (1998), 49.
- A Comment on "(Re)Revisioning the Dissertation in English Studies." College English 61.5 (1999): 625
- "Getting to know Rhetorica." Living Rhetoric and Composition: Stories of the Discipline (1999): 4.
- "Cross-Disciplinarity in Rhetorical Scholarship?." Inventing a Discipline: Rhetoric Scholarship in Honor of Richard E. Young (2000): 67-79.
- (with Susan Latta) "Student self-assessment: some issues and concerns from postmodern and feminist perspectives." Self-assessment and development in writing: A collaborative inquiry (2000): 25-33.
- "The spaciousness of rhetoric." Beyond Postprocess and Postmodernism. Routledge, 2003. 15-32.
- (with Janet M. Atwill) Perspectives on Rhetorical Invention (2004).
- Invention in Rhetoric and Composition. Parlor Press, 2005.
- "Rhetoric and composition." English studies: An introduction to the discipline(s) (2006): 106-52.
- "The Cornerstone of a Graduate Program." Renewing Rhetoric's Relation to Composition: Essays in Honor of Theresa Jarnagin Enos (2009): 104.
- "Heuristics." Encyclopedia of Rhetoric and Composition: Communication from Ancient Times to the Information Age (2012).
- (with Richard Leo Enos) "The meaning of heuristic in Aristotle's Rhetoric and its implications for contemporary rhetorical theory." Landmark Essays. Routledge, 2020. 203–212.
