= Digital Writing and Research Lab =

American research lab

- Director: Diane Davis
- Faculty: Assistant Directors - Beck Wise, Sarah Frank, Amy Tuttle and Jake Cowan; Program Coordinator - Will Burdette; Systems Administrator - Jessica Sollace
- Location: Austin, TX
- Campus: The University of Texas at Austin
- Website: https://dwrl.utexas.edu/

The Digital Writing and Research Lab (DWRL) is a research lab at The University of Texas at Austin, United States, dedicated to the identification and promotion of twenty-first-century literacies. These literacies range from navigating online newsfeeds and participating in social networking sites to composing multimedia texts that require producing, sampling, and/or remixing media content.

The lab is staffed by graduate student researchers and instructors at The University of Texas at Austin who participate in research groups, teach in computer classrooms, and hold workshops on digital pedagogy. "Staff work involves both routine classroom support and participation in on-going Lab projects such as the development of computer-based instructional materials (courseware) and documentation, as well as identification and documentation of successful pedagogical practices and research into other pedagogical applications of computer technology."

Established in 1985 as the Computer Research Lab (CRL), the lab was known as the Computer Writing and Research Lab (CWRL) from the 1990s to 2010, when it became the Digital Writing and Research Lab (DWRL).

== History ==
=== Origins ===
The DWRL began in 1985 with the acquisition of twelve IBM microcomputers as a result of a Project QUEST grant to the University of Texas at Austin. English department faculty member Jerome Bump and his graduate students later arranged for the machines to be moved from the University Writing Center (housed in the English department) to vacant space in the basement of the Undergraduate Library. This space was deemed the Computer Research Lab (CRL) and marked the beginning of the research into computer-based writing at The University of Texas at Austin.

In fall 1986 Bump offered a graduate seminar on rhetoric and computers, which he co-taught with Lt. Col. Hugh Burns. Burns, who worked in the Intelligent Systems Division at Brooks Air Force Base in San Antonio, had written the first dissertation in what became the academic field of Computers and Writing. Graduate students in this seminar sought to advance Burns's efforts to explore how the computer could serve less as a “teaching machine” and more as a constructive partner in dialogue with student-writers. Theoretically, this work aligned well with the emerging “process” model of writing instruction, and Burns's presence lent national credibility to the group. Burns coined the name of the new Computer Research Lab.

Participants in the newly established lab dedicated their efforts to finding alternative models for the writing classroom. The lab's first local area network (LAN) allowed computers in the lab to be linked to one another, as well as to machines in an adjacent instructional room. This arrangement eventually enabled colleagues from the English department to teach first-year English courses in the CRL's first "computational classroom" as Bump and his graduate students called it.

=== Early products ===
Graduate student Fred Kemp's software Idealog focused on invention or pre-writing, while his colleague Paul Taylor's Descant assisted revision. Other students, moving away from the “process” instructional model that underpinned these two, developed programs of their own that prioritized social interaction. These included Locke Carter's In-Class Mail and Paul Taylor's Forum5. Even though the programs emerged from different theoretical assumptions, they could be used together.

They also supplied the foundation for the most notable achievement of the lab's formative years, the Daedalus Integrated Writing Environment (DIWE), a suite of applications that integrated elements of the writing process. DIWE included four major modules: Invent, Respond, Mail (an asynchronous, internal messaging system), and InterChange (a conferencing system that allowed for synchronous—real-time—interaction among students and instructors). Several scholars went on to praise InterChange, in particular, for its capacity to transform the dynamics of a writing classroom.

=== Focus on Digital Pedagogy ===
In January 1989, under the leadership of director John Slatin, the lab's staff began to assemble an archive of pedagogical texts—materials associated with the lab's attempts to conduct writing instruction in computer classrooms—and co-hosted the sixth Conference on Computers and Writing.

Slatin wrote a funding proposal that increased the university-wide visibility of the CRL, eventually establishing computer labs and networks and disseminating new DIWE software across departments on UT-Austin's campus. Funding for additional labs and multimedia hardware also tightened the ties between the CRL and the English department and, later, the new Division of Rhetoric and Composition (which, upon its creation in 1993, assumed administrative oversight of the CRL).

The lab's institutional growth continued with the hiring in 1994 of faculty member Margaret Syverson, trained in Computers and Writing, and the recruitment of additional graduate students. Syverson directed the rechristened Computer Writing and Research Lab from 1994 to 2004.

From 2004 to 2008 Clay Spinuzzi directed the CWRL. In 2004 the CWRL hired current systems administrator D. Hampton Finger, who facilitated the lab's switch to Drupal for its web content management. This shift allowed for greater accessibility and made personal Drupal installations available for instructors. As a result of a university pilot program using WebXM to ensure web accessibility, in October 2006 the CWRL lowered its webpage's structural accessibility violations from 3100 pages to zero.

During 2004-2005, the CWRL created a workgroup model in which workgroup leaders assemble small teams to work on particular projects, allowing for greater continuity from year to year. From 2006 to 2008, the CWRL pursued outside partnerships. The lab redeveloped and rationalized archives of English and rhetoric exercises in a system called eFiles, and developed viz., a blog about visual rhetoric.

== Programs ==
The DWRL launches yearly programs offering instructors tools to teach communicative competencies. These competencies include: proficiency in software packages and technological devices; the ability to collaborate across barriers; confidence in producing, analyzing and sharing information in various digital formats; and skills to manage, analyze, and synthesize multiple streams of simultaneous information.

== Publications ==
- "'viz.'" - "The award-winning and widely-read digital publication viz. is committed to the intersections of Rhetoric and visual culture. In keeping with its mission to promote visual literacy, the viz. blog presents a daily community forum for discussing images in the digital age." Viz also produces static content in arenas such as multi-form interviews, assignments, theory pages, and teaching guides.
- "'Blogging Pedagogy'" - Blogging Pedagogy offers reflections on teaching practices in English and writing studies. The blog is open to members of these pedagogical communities who want to share resources, engage their peers in discussions of best practices, and reflect on successes and challenges.
- "'Lesson Plan Library'" - A collection of "innovative technology-based lesson plans and classroom assignments created by DWRL Instructors. The lesson plans address a broad spectrum of pedagogical activities—from initial brainstorming to electronic peer review, from interactive visual rhetoric lessons to collaborative multi-media online publications." Users will find activities that range from one class period to semester-long assignments.
- "'Currents in Electronic Literacy'" - “Currents in Electronic Literacy" is a journal indexed in the MLA International Bibliography and EBSCO (ISSN 1524-6493); it is internally peer reviewed by a cohort of graduate students and faculty at the University of Texas at Austin. Issues have featured articles and interviews by leaders in the fields of literacy, literature, technology, and rhetoric including Barbara Biesecker, Alex Reid, Josh Gunn, Lawrence Lessig, Bret Benjamin, Stuart Selber, Robert Scholes, Alan Liu, and Avital Ronell among others.
- "'The Journal for Undergraduate Multimedia Projects'" - "TheJUMP" publishes submissions from undergraduate students that display successful engagement with digital technologies and use rhetorical elements to make an argument, tell a story, or share research. Essential to the mission of "TheJUMP" is the promotion of discourse about multimedia pedagogy and student learning. To that end, each piece is published alongside course and assignment information as well as reflections from the student author and his/her instructor and responses from two members of "TheJUMP" editorial collective.

== Initiatives ==
Each year, the DWRL designs and implements research projects. These year-long initiatives enhance graduate instructors' professional and teaching portfolios. The research produced results in white papers, conference presentations, videos, and pedagogical resources like lesson plans. Project leaders, members and lab specialists also offer workshops throughout the year which share tools for pedagogical innovation. The results of the research conducted in the project groups is presented every year at the DWRL Final Showcase as well as archived online.

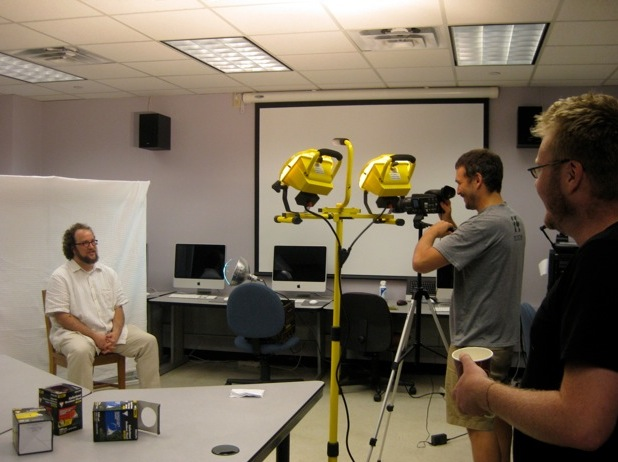
DWRL staffers experiment with lights, cameras, and backdrops for a video series on writing processes

=== Research initiatives ===
- Gaming Pedagogy - The group is researching the potential and applicability of a games in the classroom, whether those be tabletop games, educational games, commercial video games, or games made by independent groups and will publish an eBook to showcase their findings. They are building on the work of the Immersive Environments group, which has explores the intersections among gaming, pedagogy, and virtual worlds and which designed and implemented two games in the rhetoric classroom: "Rhetorical Peaks and "Battle Lines".
- Audio Video Research - Now in its second year, the ARVG group is creating an audio podcast series spotlighting intersections of rhetoric and technology. The 2011-12 group collaborated with the Undergraduate Writing Center on the WRITE series—videos that feature writers at all levels talking about their writing processes—as well as a prototype for an online tutorial series.
- Currents in Electronic Literacy - In addition to soliciting, editing, and publishing the annual issue of the DWRL's e-journal Currents in Electronic Literacy, members of the group research digital publication platforms and optimization strategies for mobile viewing.
- Visual Rhetoric - In addition to producing the DWRL's award-winning visual rhetoric blog, viz., the Visual Rhetoric group have collaborated with the Harry Ransom Center (HRC). The group will engage with the HRC's collections and exhibitions to extend their research in visual rhetoric.
- The Journal for Undergraduate Multimedia Projects (TheJUMP) - This group publishes TheJUMP twice annually and serves as a resource for other DWRL members on issues of accessibility and undergraduate publication.

=== Products of past initiatives ===
- "Battle Lines"
- "Rhetorical Peaks" - an interactive video game for rhetoric and writing instruction.
- "Where Media and Pedagogy Meet": A map of sites of online discourse in digital humanities and rhetorical pedagogy.
- Oral history lesson plans
- viz. social tagging work via the STEVE in Action project, in partnership with the Blanton Museum of Art - a study of how students write about abstract art.
- viz. image maps for the Harry Ransom Center - an interactive tour of the HRC exhibitions and the viz. blog.
- Daedalus Integrated Writing Environment - a suite of collaborative tools designed to run on a local area network, helps students develop their skills in writing and critical thinking.
- The Learning Record Online - a portfolio-based method for accounting for learning in complex systems.
- White papers

== Speaker series ==
Since 2007 the DWRL has held a speaker series, bringing some of the foremost thinkers in digital literacy and learning technologies to the University of Texas at Austin. Past speakers include:

- Jody Shipka (To Honor, Rival, and Revise: On the Process of Composing Other People's Lives, 2014)
- Rita Raley (Tactical Media as Speculative Practice, 2013)
- Barbara Biesecker (Memory and Technology Panel, 2012)
- Josh Gunn, "Something Lawful Encrusted on the Living: Canned Laughter as an Archive" (Memory and Technology Panel, 2012)
- Alex Reid ( Memory and Technology Panel, 2012)
- Paul Miller aka DJ Spooky That Subliminal Kid, "Sound Unbound" (2011)
- David Parry, "Burn the Boats/Books" (2010)
- Cynthia Selfe, "Stories That Speak to Us: The Intellectual and Social Work of Literacy Narratives and Digital Archives" (2009)
- Michael Joyce, "Touching Upon the Truth" (2009)
- Gregory Ulmer, "ELECTRACY: Writing to Avatar" (2008)
- Lisa Maruca, "Eighteenth-Century Cyborg Writing: An Unnatural History of Literacy" (2008)
- Cynthia Haynes, "Avatar Nation Secedes, Cites Moral Panic as Grounds for Political Divorce" (2007)
- Victor Vitanza, "Dasein as Design: Scar..."] (2007)

== Courses and classrooms ==
The courses taught throughout the DWRL are Rhetoric and English classes which benefit from a computer-learning environment. Computer classrooms allow students access to learning technologies including their own Mac desktop computer. Instructors control a teacher station through which they are able to project images, websites and video. All students enrolled in courses conducted in computer classrooms have access to a computer lab.

== Staff ==
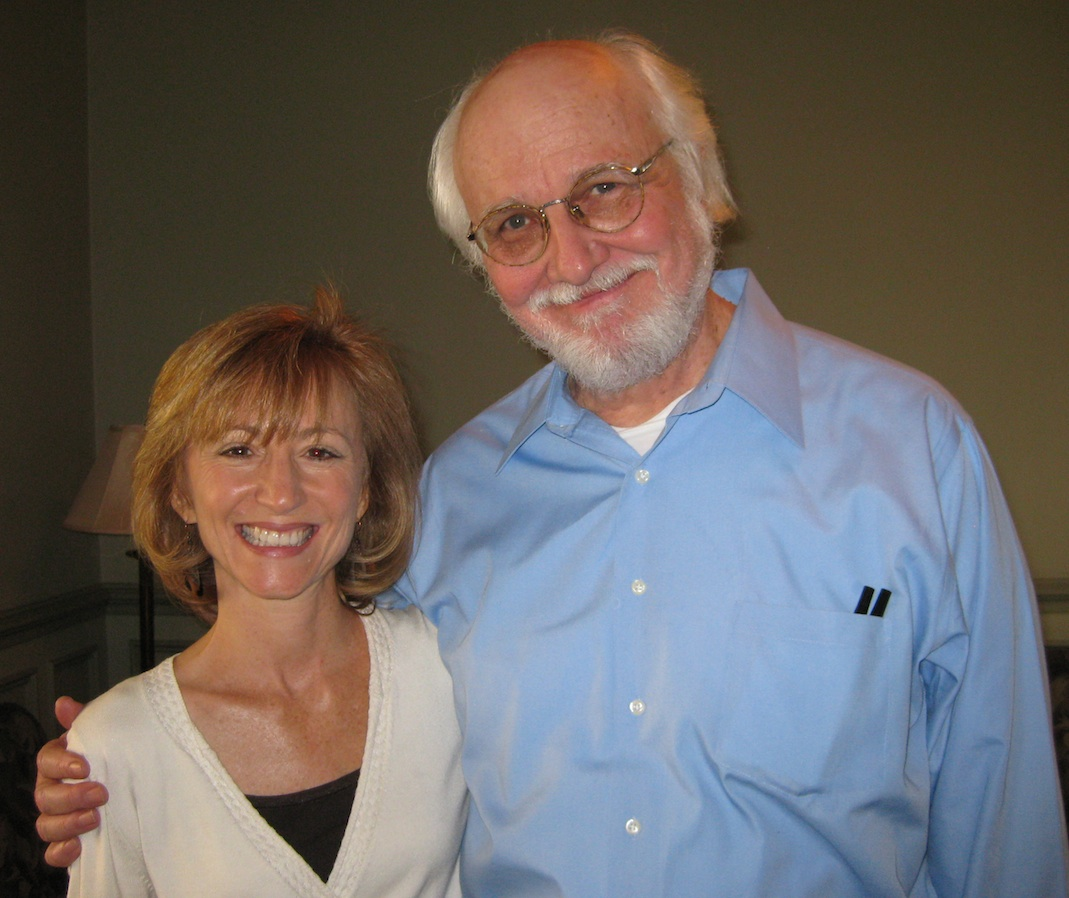
Former Director of the DWRL, Diane Davis, with guest speaker Gregory Ulmer

- Director - Diane Davis
- Assistant Directors - Beck Wise, Sarah Frank, Amy Tuttle and Jake Cowan
- Program Coordinator - Will Burdette
- Systems Administrator - Jessica Sollace
