= James A. Berlin =

- Born: January 7, 1942; Hamtramck, Michigan
- Died: February 2, 1994 (aged 52)
- Occupation: Professor

Academic background
- Education: Central Michigan University, B.A. University of Michigan, Ph.D

James A. Berlin (January 7, 1942 – February 2, 1994) was an American scholar, professor, writer, and theorist in the field of composition studies, renowned for his contributions to the history of rhetoric and composition theory.

Born in Hamtramck, Michigan, Berlin attended St. Florian High School. He earned his BA from Central Michigan University and completed his Ph.D. in Victorian literature at the University of Michigan in 1975. Throughout his career, he held positions as a professor of English at Wichita State University, the University of Cincinnati, where he directed first-year English from 1981 to 1985, and Purdue University from 1987 to 1994. Additionally, Berlin served as a visiting professor at the University of Texas and Penn State University.

Berlin was actively involved in a fellowship-in-residence, sponsored by the National Endowment for the Humanities (NEH), alongside notable figures in contemporary rhetorical theory, including Lisa Ede, Robert Inkster, Charles Kneupper, Linda Flower, Janice Lauer, and Victor Vitanza. During this time, he collaborated with Richard Young on the topic of rhetorical invention. Berlin's academic journey led him to deeply explore the works of Karl Marx, and he later integrated Göran Therborn's version of Marxist ideology into his research, finding in Therborn a comrade who recognized the power and function of rhetorical principles.

On February 2, 1994, Berlin died following a heart attack.

== Contributions and impact ==
=== Theoretical contributions ===
James A. Berlin is most known for developing social-epistemic rhetoric, a theory that examines how writing relates to ideology and social context. This view states that factors such as social conditions and discourse communities influence how one writes. Berlin's theory discusses how factors like material conditions and social ideologies shape writing.

Berlin's work has also led to debate about ideology in composition studies.HIs ideas in rhetorical theory and writing instruction have been questioned. Critics mainly focus on to what extent language and writing shapes society's beliefs and values, with some arguing that Berlin overstates the relationship and does not fully account for other influences such as material conditions or individual agency. Some have also noticed how his theory connects rhetoric to larger ideological systems and treats rhetorical activity as a way ideology can be shared or challenged.

=== Influence and legacy ===
Berlin's theories have played a significant role in shaping talks regarding writing pedagogy in composition studies during the late twentieth century. His ideas led many instructors to reconsider their assumptions about language and examine how those assumptions influence the way they teach. When teachers approach language as a social construct, this tends to shape practical decisions made in the class, including course organization and writing assignments. As a result, the kind of composition theory associated with Berlin remained closely linked to how writing was actually taught.

Following Berlin's death, his ideas persisted in influencing talks about writing instruction and composition pedagogy. Research on what has been called "post-Berlinian" composition pedagogy examines how instructors influenced by his theories expanded the role of cultural studies within writing classrooms. These approaches encourage students to look at more than just traditional written texts. Instead of focusing only on essays or books, students may look at other parts of everyday culture, like media or public conversations. These can become material for analysis inside of the classroom. When these kinds of materials are including in writing instruction, students can begin to see how language is shaped by the world around them, and how it connects to larger ideas of power and belief. The continued use of these approaches show how Berlin's ideas are still relevant today. This could be due to many other views on composition continuing to emphasize the connection between writing and the cultural context it is produced in.

Berlin's work frequently appears in discussions of how composition theory shifted in the early twenty-first century. During this time, composition scholars grew increasingly interested in how culture and society shape written communication. Because Berlin had already engaged with these questions, his work served as a popular point of reference in the field. He argued that the values and assumptions embedded within social life shape not only how people write, but also how writing is read and understood.

== Major publications ==
Rhetorics, Poetics, and Cultures: Refiguring College English Studies. Urbana, Illinois: NCTE, 1996.

Rhetoric and Reality: Writing Instruction in American Colleges. 1900–1985. Carbondale: Southern Illinois UP, 1987.

Writing Instruction in Nineteenth-Century American Colleges. Carbondale: Southern Illinois UP, 1984.

"Cultural Studies." Encyclopedia of Rhetoric and Composition. Ed. Theresa Enos. NY: Garland, 1996. 154–56.

"Poststructuralism, Cultural Studies, and the Composition Classroom." Rhetoric Review 11 (Fall 1992): 16–33. Rpt. Professing the New Rhetoric. Ed. Theresa Enos and Stuart C. Brown. Englewood Cliffs, New Jersey: Prentice Hall, 1994. 461–480.

"Revisionary Histories of Rhetoric: Politics, Power, and Plurality." Writing Histories of Rhetoric. Ed. Victor J. Vitanza. Carbondale: Southern Illinois UP, 1994. 112–127.

"Composition Studies and Cultural Studies: Collapsing Boundaries." Into the Field: Sites of Composition Studies. Ed. Anne Ruggles Gere. NY: MLA,1993. 99–116.

"Composition and Cultural Studies." Composition and Resistance. Eds. Hurlbert, C. Mark and Michael Blitz. Portsmouth, NH: Boynton/Cook, 1991.

"Postmodernism, Politics, and Histories of Rhetorics." PRE/TEXT 11.3–4 (1990): 169–187.

"Rhetoric and Ideology in the Writing Class." College English 50 (1988): 477–494.

Berlin, James A., et al. Octalog. "The Politics of Historiography." Rhetoric Review 7 (1988): 5–49.

"Revisionary History: The Dialectical Method." PRE/TEXT 8.1–2 (1987): 47–61.

"Rhetoric and Poetics in the English Department: Our Nineteenth-Century Inheritance." College English 47 (1985): 531–533.

"Contemporary Composition: The Major Pedagogical Theories." College English 44 (1982): 765–777.

Berlin, James A., and Robert P. Inkster. "Current-Traditional Rhetoric: Paradigm and Practice." Freshman English News 8. 3 (Winter 1980): 1–4, 13–14.

"Richard Whately and Current-Traditional Rhetoric." College English 42 (September 1980): 10–17.

== Additional resources on James A. Berlin ==
- Heinemann Books
- Rhetoric and Reality: Writing Instruction in American Colleges, 1900–1985, Carbondale: Southern Illinois UP, 1987. ISBN 0-8093-1360-X
- In Memory of James A. Berlin
