= Victor Vitanza =

Victor J. Vitanza is a Professor of English at Clemson University (South Carolina). He is the former Director of the interdisciplinary-transdisciplinary Ph.D. program in Rhetorics, Communication, and Information Design, which is situated in the College of Architecture, Arts, and Humanities.

Formerly at University of Texas at Arlington (1982–2005), Vitanza works in Media and Communication Philosophy, but that work also finds him teaching summer seminars at the European Graduate School (EGS) in Saas-Fee, Switzerland, where he holds the Jean-Francois Lyotard Chair. Previously, he earned his second PhD at EGS under the title "Chaste Rape: Sexual Violence, Canon Formation, and Rhetorical Cultures" (director, Wolfgang Schirmacher; readers, Alain Badiou and Giorgio Agamben).

In 1978 and 1979, Vitanza received a National Endowment for Humanities Fellowship-in-Residence to work with Richard Emerson Young at Carnegie Mellon University (Pittsburgh) on the topic of "Rhetorical Invention". Other participants included Sharon Bassett, James A. Berlin, Lisa Ede, David Fractenberg, Robert P. Inkster, Charles Kneupper, Sam Watson Jr., Vickie Winkler, and William Nelson. Other participating colleagues included Peter Becker, Linda Flower, and Janice Lauer, all important figures in the field of Rhetoric and Composition.

Vitanza went on to found and publish the quarterly journal PRE/TEXT (1980–present). Along with Cynthia Haynes, Vitanza started the E-journal, Pre/Text: Electra(Lite), and created an on-line forum called Re/Inter/View listserv that currently has over 500 members. The month-long archived discussions hosted a range of figures from rhetoric and composition and elsewhere including Noam Chomsky, Jane Gallop, Sharon Crowley, and Geoffrey Sirc.

== Work ==
Vitanza's work concentrates on histories of rhetorics and specifically on a "third sophistic" as well as the "excluded middle". His efforts extend the implications of Gregory Ulmer's electracy to the field of rhetorical historiographies, or what Vitanza calls "hysteriography" (and later "schizography"). Vitanza's efforts are to reread and rewrite questions and concepts raised by such theorists and historians as Gilles Deleuze, Samuel Ijsseling, Giorgio Agamben, and Jean-François Lyotard. Vitanza deploys these figures to consider and disrupt the role of negation and subjectivity in "the" history of rhetoric.

Negation, Subjectivity, and The History of Rhetoric (1997) is the title of Vitanza's first book. His efforts are large-scale re-assessments of the sense of negation that Kenneth Burke helps define. Vitanza's efforts extend to a reconsideration of other figures important to rhetorical historiography such as Susan Jarrett, Edward Schiappa, and John Poulakos. Through it all, Vitanza seeks a movement from (negative) possibilities and probabilities to (denegated) incompossibilities (counter-factual, co-extensive possibilities).

In Vitanza's recent work, he challenges Leibniz's foundational example of using Sextus's rape of Lucretia to ground a conception of "the best of all possible worlds". Extending Deleuze's re-reading of Leibniz in The Fold and Agamben's sense of "decreation", Vitanza seeks after all the denegated incompossibilities that result when "what happened and what did not happen are returned to their originary unity" (Agamben's Potentialities 270).

Vitanza's long-term project, according to a description on his website, is entitled Design as Dasein, and it "will examine how philosophical and architectural attitudes are represented under the signs of negativity and death".

Vitanza's most recent scholarly texts have been in the area of film (Chaste Cinematics 2015).

== Bibliography ==
- Chaste Cinematics. (Punctum Books 2015).
- Sexual Violence in Western Thought and Writing: Chaste Rape (Palgrave Macmillan 2011).
- Negation, Subjectivity, and The History of Rhetoric. (SUNY P 1997).
- Writing Histories of Rhetoric (SIUP, 1993).
- PRE/TEXT: The First Decade (U of Pittsburgh P, 1993).
- CyberReader (Longman/Pearson. 1st, 2nd, and abridged editions).
- "Love, Lust, Rhetorics (from Double Binds to Intensities)." Living Rhetoric and Composition: Stories of the Discipline. Ed. Duane Roen, Stewart Brown, and Theresa Enos. NJ: Lawrence Erlbaum, 1998. 143-58.
- "The Hermeneutics of Abandonment." Parallax 4.4 (1998): 123–39.
- "From Heuristic to Aleatory Procedures; or, Towards 'Writing the Accident'." Inventing a Discipline: Rhetoric Scholarship in Honor of Richard E. Young, Ed. Maureen Daly Goggin. Urbana, IL: NCTE, 2000. 185-206.
- "Abandoned to Writing: Notes Toward Several Provocations ." Enculturation 5.1 (Fall 2003): https://web.archive.org/web/20060518101353/http://enculturation.gmu.edu/5_1/vitanza.html (A continuation of "The Hermeneutics of Abandonment")
- "Favorinus." In Classical Rhetorics and Rhetoricians: Critical Studies and Sources. West Port, Conn, and London: Praeger, 2005. 148–52.
- "Adieu Derrida," in Poiesis 7 (Toronto, EGS Press, 2005): 64-65.
