= Internet Invention =

Book by G. Ulmer

- Author: Gregory Ulmer
- Language: English
- Publisher: Longman
- Publication date: 2003
- Media type: Paperback
- Pages: 338
- ISBN: 9780321126924

Internet Invention is a 2003 book by Gregory Ulmer. The book describes Ulmer's definition of "electracy" (as opposed to orality or literacy) and leads readers through to make more activities that ask them to examine their interactions with four discourses, which Ulmer labels career, family, entertainment, and community.

== Mystory ==
"To approach knowledge from the side of not knowing what it is, from the side of one who is learning, not from that of one who already knows, is mystory."—Gregory Ulmer, Teletheory

Mystory is the name of a new pedagogical genre created by Ulmer in his book Teletheory. It was a response to a suggestion by Hayden White that if the concept of history had been invented in the twentieth century rather than the nineteenth, it would be quite different. The idea was that if people had begun serious study of the past in the twentieth century rather than the nineteenth, the result would be quite different from what it is today.

Mystory is Ulmer's new approach towards learning in general. A mystory itself is a website created by the student that explores the four discourses (career, family, entertainment, and community) and then has the students find links between the various discourses to gain a new understanding of how they think. The final synthesis of these ideas is represented by a self-created emblem that represents the student, their history, and their method of thinking.

The final product of the mystory is to have a new approach to learning that allows them to learn better than they would by following the standard methods of learning usually propagated within colleges and universities. By learning to learn based on themselves and their own culture rather than the culture of the school, the students gain a deeper understanding of what they're learning. In addition, this new vantage point towards knowledge aids in thinking about problems and issues in society, which is part of the EmerAgency concept.

The idea behind the mystory comes from Ulmer's attempt to create electracy and the EmerAgency. The mystory site allows for students to re-evaluate their ways of thinking and then apply that to situations and ideas that the EmerAgency would deal with.

== EmerAgency ==
When Gregory Ulmer announced to his father and uncle that he was changing his major in college from economics and political science to English, they were astonished, believing that such a degree would have no practical value. However, Ulmer contends that no issue in the world can be solved without considering the human aspect of it. The EmerAgency is Ulmer's real life study of whether English can help to solve issues by considering them in light of humanity. He believes that this can be done through electracy, and if so, he posits that there is practical value in the field of English.

The EmerAgency is composed of those individuals who are building a widesite based on the exercises in Internet Invention. Through application in those individuals’ widesites, Ulmer is building the EmerAgency, which he describes as being “a conceptual consulting agency.” Because the EmerAgency was created to build a mass of consultants who are all working on this same question, the members of the EmerAgency take on the slogan, “Problems B Us."

== Style ==
Internet Invention is roughly divided into four sections, each one covering one of the four discourses. Each chapter is further divided into smaller topics that loosely build upon each other with a series of concepts, examples, and exercises for the reader. Keeping in line with the concept of electracy, Ulmer borrows concepts and terms from many different sources to describe his ideas, although the background information describing these terms is often kept to a bare minimum or absent. Likewise, the examples he offers to illustrate the concepts are taken from many different writers and outside sources. Apart from the handful of images that appear on the title pages of major sections of the book, Internet Invention contains no images, despite the interplay between images and text being a major focus in the book and the concept of electracy itself.

Ulmer's prose is complex, and the sheer number of specialized terms and prerequisite knowledge required to understand all of the concepts offered within make Internet Invention more accessible to those who have adequate knowledge of rhetoric and writing. The book is laid out in a way that makes it ideal for study in a class or for individual reading.

== Postmodern Influences ==
In Internet Invention, Ulmer draws heavily on a number of theorists who are considered postmodern or poststructuralist. Specifically, Jacques Derrida’s work is referenced throughout the book, and Derrida plays a central role in Ulmer's own Mystory, as it takes shape throughout the book. In some senses, Internet Invention is at least in part an attempt to apply several Derridean ideas to the field of communication and technology. To this extent, the book is a successor to one of Ulmer's earlier works, Applied Grammatology, his 1985 book that attempts to frame a practical pedagogy based largely on Derrida's Of Grammatology.

Another central figure is Roland Barthes, particularly in context of Barthes discussion of the photographic image. Barthes's concepts of the studium and the punctum figure heavily in Ulmer's description of the mechanism by which images are read.

Other significant postmodern figures whom Ulmer references include Martin Heidegger, Michel Foucault, Algirdas Greimas, Terry Eagleton, Gilles Deleuze, and Giorgio Agamben.

Internet Invention goes beyond simply using references to specific authors who fall under the umbrella of postmodernism. Both the concepts and the presentation of the book owe much to postmodern thought. Ulmer's thought and presentation throughout the work relies on highly idiosyncratic juxtaposition of concepts as well as the use of extended excerpts from other texts worked into each chapter, resulting in a type of verbal collage.

Reviewers have seen Ulmer's use of postmodern theory and style in Internet Invention as both a strong point of the work as well as a potential liability, particularly for use among undergraduate students unfamiliar with the figures and concepts he draws on. In reviewing Internet Invention for Enculturation, Jenny Edbauer writes:

“Users will necessarily find Internet Invention’s language dis/re/orienting, for electracy itself is a reorientation of literacy . . . Though I hope Internet Invention is indeed the first of a new generation of writing texts, as Michael Salvo’s blurb says on the back cover, I fear that its squeals, stammers, and uncoordinated leaps will scare away many instructors.”

Chidsey Dickson, in a review for Kairos, suggests that a cross-referenced glossary would be a valuable addition given the wide array of names, terms, and concepts used in the book.

At the same time, the book has also been praised as an excellent example of making key concepts of postmodernity relevant and practical. Julie Kearney, in her review of the book for Computers and Composition Online, states that:

“Ulmer tackles the complexities of the cutting edge theory and practice of electronic discourse from a detailed, innovative, and intelligent perspective.”
