= Lynn Tomlinson =

American animator and artist

- Education: Cornell University (BA, English); University of the Arts (MA, Art Education); Annenberg School for Communication at the University of Pennsylvania (MA, Communication); Towson University (MFA, Studio Art)
- Occupations: Animator, artist, professor
- Employer: Towson University
- Notable work: The Elephant's Song, The Ballad of Holland Island House
- Website: lynntomlinson.com

Lynn Tomlinson is an animator and artist. She is a professor at Towson University. She lives in Baltimore, MD, with her husband, Craig J Saper, and her family. She has taught at Cornell University, the University of the Arts in Philadelphia, Maryland Institute College of Art, and Delaware College of Art and Design, Richard Stockton College, and Tufts University. Her films have been screened at film festivals around the world over the past two decades. She has received awards and grants including several Mid-Atlantic Emmys, an ITVS production grant, and Individual Artist Fellowships from the State Arts Councils of Pennsylvania, Florida, and Maryland.

== Education ==
Tomlinson holds degrees from Cornell University (BA, English), the University of the Arts (MA, Art Education), the Annenberg School for Communication at the University of Pennsylvania (MA, Communication), and Towson University (MFA, Studio Art).

== Work ==
Tomlinson's animation work involves the use of a "clay on glass animation technique", involving the use shifting perspectives and the animation of the moving clay. Her work explores environmental themes, examining the human impact on the environment. Tomlinson has created animations for PBS Kids, Sesame Street, and MTV. She has also exhibited her films internationally. Tomlinson's works have been cited for "expand[ing] the horizons of contemporary animated form" as well as "convey[ing] the enormity of permanent loss".

The Elephant's Song received multiple awards, including Best of Festival from the Peekskill Film Festival and Best Animation from the University Film and Video Association. The Ballad of Holland Island House was awarded a prize from Greenpeace.

=== Selected filmography ===
- Both Sides Now (Clay-on-glass, 1998) – 1 min. Segment for A Little Curious on HBO Family
- P's Please (Clay-on-glass, 1996) – 45 secs. Short film for Sesame Street
- WHYY-TV – In the 1990s she created numerous short station IDs for WHYY-TV in Philadelphia and other shorts for ITVS that have been televised nationally, e.g., Frog Harmony
- MTV Fishbowl (Clay-on-glass, 1989) - 20 secs. Produced and animated a 20-second bumper for MTV, 1989–1991
- MTV Free Your Mind Spot (Clay-on-glass, 1994) – 30 secs. Produced, directed and animated a 30-second spot for MTV
- Cauldron (Clay-on-glass, 1994) – 5 mins. Funded by Pittsburgh Filmmakers Mid-Atlantic Region Media Arts Fellowship, the Pennsylvania Council on the Arts, and PIFVA Subsidy Grant. Screened at Philadelphia Festival of World Cinema and the Festival of Independents
- Paper Walls (1993) – Mixed live action and multi-media animation, 6 mins. Spotlight film for WHYY, based on Charlotte Perkins Gilman's story
- I Heard a Fly Buzz When I Died – 1.5 minutes, based on Emily Dickinson's poem of the same name
- The Ballad of Holland Island House (2014) – 04:20
- The Elephant's Song (2018) – 07:40

=== Media art projects ===
- Hannibal Square Community Mosaic Project – A community-based art project working with children and artists from the Crealde School of Art, to celebrate the history of Hannibal Square in Winter Park, FL.
- Folkvine – Film and interactive documentaries of Florida folk artists. Tomlinson is the videographer and editor.
- Girls of the World – Five fifth grade girls made animated stories from the history of girlhood. Tomlinson was the producer and creative director of the project.
- Shopping for Utopia – Elementary school kids give animated tours of utopian societies that they designed. Tomlinson was the producer and creative director for this project. One of the tours features work by her son, Sam Saper.
- Boxed In – 1996 ArtFronts project funded a storefront installation in center-city Phila., Sept.-Nov. 1996. Collaboration with sculptor Bill Tomlinson. A 25-foot (7.6 m)-long man crouched in the store window, holding a television monitor that captured the images of the passers-by. Reviews appeared in the Philadelphia Inquirer, The City Paper, and the Philadelphia Forum.
