= Robert B. Heilman =

American educator (1906–2004)

Robert Bechtold Heilman (July 18, 1906 – August 5, 2004) was an American educator and writer.

== Life in academia ==
Heilman attended Lafayette College and later received his Ph.D. in English from Harvard University in 1935. Soon after, he began teaching at Louisiana State University (LSU). His entry into LSU occurred shortly after the rise of the Fugitive poets. While he was at LSU, many of his colleagues were influenced by the school of New Criticism. In 1948 Heilman joined the University of Washington faculty, as chair of the English department, which he led until his retirement in 1971.

== "The Southern Temper" ==
One example of Heilman's writing is his essay "The Southern Temper", in the collection Southern Renascence: The Literature of the Modern South (1953). In this piece, Heilman argues that there are five components to Southern writing, and that Southern writing should be valued for its ability to mix these components into a balanced canon:

1. sense of the elemental: complement to the ornamental, emphasizes the action as unembellished, Ex. violence seen in the works of Faulkner as examples of the elemental.
2. sense of the ornamental: “…the awareness of style as integral in all kinds of communication…” ex. writings of Robert Warren
3. sense of the concrete: writings “…incline not to linger in the realm of theory as such but to hurry on to the exemplary case”
4. sense of the representative: one obligation to the present is to refer to the past
5. sense of totality: “…we do not live alone in time, thrust into eminence, and into finality, by what went before, servile and unentangling” again, importance of the past

== Books ==
- America in English Fiction 1760 to 1800: The Influences of the American Revolution (1937, 1968)
- Aspects of Democracy (1941, 1968) (edited)
- Aspects of a World at War (1943)
- Understanding Drama: Twelve Plays (1945, 1948) (with Cleanth Brooks)
- This Great Stage: Image and Structure in King Lear (1948, 1963)
- An Anthology of English Drama before Shakespeare (1952) (edited)
- Modern Short Stories: A Critical Anthology (1953, 1971) (edited)
- Shakespearean Tragedy and the Drama of Disaster (1960)
- Tragedy and Melodrama: Versions of Experience (1968)
- The Ghost on the Ramparts, and Other Essays in the Humanities (1973)
- The Iceman, the Arsonist, and the Troubled Agent: Tragedy and Melodrama on the Modern Stage (1973)
- Magic in the Web: Action & Language in Othello (1977)
- The Ways of the World: Comedy and Society (1978)
- Shakespeare, the Tragedies: New Perspectives (1984) (edited)
- The Southern Connection: Essays (1991)
- The Workings of Fiction: Essays (1993)
- The Professor and the Profession (1999)
- Robert B. Heilman and Eric Voegelin: A Friendship in Letters, 1944–1984 (2004) (edited by Charles R. Embry)
- Robert B. Heilman: His Life in Letters (2009) (edited by Edward Alexander, Richard Dunn, and Paul Jaussen)

== Robert B. Heilman Prize ==
Heilman contributed for 60 years to the Sewanee Review, and was an advisory editor for nearly 30 years. The editor from 1973 to 2016, George Core, wrote of him: "The greatness of Bob Heilman was demonstrated many times as he discharged his many offices – teacher, administrator, scholar, critic, editor, essayist, citizen in the body politic – with vast accomplishment and unfailing panache."

Beginning in 1994, the Sewanee Review has awarded an annual prize in Heilman's name for the most accomplished book reviewing in the magazine in the calendar year. Recipients of the Robert B. Heilman Prize have been:

- 1994 — George Woodcock
- 1995 — Edward L. Galligan
- 1996 — Judith Weissman
- 1997 — J. A. Bryant, Jr
- 1998 — William Harmon
- 1999 — Sam Pickering
- 2000 — Walter Sullivan
- 2001 — Scott Donaldson
- 2002 — Heinz R. Kuehn
- 2003 — Cushing Strout
- 2004 — Stephen Miller
- 2005 — Sam Pickering
- 2006 — Ed Minus
- 2007 — Ann E. Berthoff
- 2008 — William Harmon
- 2009 — Warner Berthoff
- 2010 — Merritt Moseley
- 2011 — Phillip Parotti
- 2012 — Russell Fraser
- 2013 — Merritt Moseley
- 2014 — George Poe
- 2015 — Christopher McDonough
