= Ann E. Berthoff =

Scholar of composition (1924–2022)

Ann E. Berthoff (February 13, 1924 – November 26, 2022) was a scholar of composition who promoted the study of I.A. Richards and Paulo Freire and the value of their work for writing studies.

== Biography ==
Ann Rhys Evans was born in New York. From 1941 to 1943 she attended Birmingham-Southern College, where she wrote for the student newspaper The Quad. She completed her undergraduate studies at Cornell College in 1945, and obtained her master's degree from Radcliffe College in 1948. She began working as an English instructor at Bradford Junior College the same year. In 1949, she married Warner Berthoff, a scholar of American Renaissance literature.

From 1951 to 1962, Berthoff taught at Bryn Mawr College. In 1965, she taught at both Swarthmore College and Haverford College. She began as a lecturer at the University of Massachusetts Boston in 1969, where she was promoted to associate professor in 1970 and full professor in 1978. Berthoff led a National Endowment for the Humanities Summer Seminar entitled "Philosophy and the Composing Process." She retired from the University of Massachusetts Boston in 1987. A festschrift edited collection was published in her honor the next year. Berthoff was the 1997 CCCC Exemplar Awardee. She also won the Robert B. Heilman Prize from The Sewanee Review in 2007. Berthoff died in her home on November 26, 2022, at the age of 98.

== Works ==
Berthoff published her book Resolved Soul: A Study of Marvell's Major Poems in 1970. This book explores the philosophy of the English metaphysical poet Andrew Marvell.

In 1971, Berthoff critiqued Janice Lauer's approach to heuristics in her article "The Problem of Problem Solving." Berthoff took this opportunity to promote a semiotic approach to meaning-making using the work of I.A. Richards. Lauer and Berthoff debated approaches to heuristics in the journal College Composition and Communication. Berthoff further developed her theory of imagination's role in composition in articles such as "From Problem-solving to a Theory of Imagination," "Reclaiming the Imagination," and "Toward a Pedagogy of Knowing." Her major textbook, Forming, Thinking, Writing: The Composing Imagination was first published in 1978. In this textbook, Berthoff introduces the concept of the dialectical notebook, a tool for teaching response to reading. This textbook was adopted by Marquette University in 1984 and a revised edition was issued in 1988.

Berthoff argued for the importance of I.A Richards' work to composition studies, especially his understanding of C.S. Peirce's triadicity. Her articles "I.A. Richards and the Philosophy of Rhetoric," "I.A. Richards and the Audit of Meaning," and "Problem-Dissolving by Triadic Means" are examples of this line of work. She also briefly corresponded with Richards before his death. She published a collection of Richards' essays with special attention to rhetoric and composition titled Richards on Rhetoric: I.A. Richards Selected Essays 1929-1974 (1990).

Berthoff also promoted the study of Paulo Freire's work in composition studies. In addition to publishing a review of Freire's The Politics of Education: Culture, Power, and Liberation she also wrote a foreword to his Literacy: Reading the Word and the World. When Freire visited Boston in 1985, Berthoff introduced him to the audience. Freire wrote a blurb for the 1988 edition of Berthoff's Forming, Thinking, Writing. When Freire was unable to attend the Conference on College Composition and Communication due to illness, Berthoff was asked to lecture in his place.

The Ann Berthoff Papers include her correspondence with many other rhetoric and composition scholars such as Cheryl Glenn, Cy Knoblauch and Lil Brannon, John Ramage, Susan Wells, Phyllis Lassner, Howard Tinberg, Kate Ronald, Patricia Bizzell, Margaret Fay Shaw, Linda Brodkey, and Jason Palmieri. She also corresponded with Louise Rosenblatt and Ursula LeGuin.

=== Books ===
- Berthoff, Ann E. The Resolved Soul: A Study of Marvell's Major Poems. Princeton, NJ: Princeton University Press, 1970.
- Berthoff, Ann E. Forming, Thinking, Writing: The Composing Imagination. Rochelle Park, N.J.: Hayden Book, 1978.
- Berthoff, Ann E. The Making of Meaning: Metaphors, Models, and Maxims for Writing Teachers. Montclair, N.J.: Boynton/Cook Publishers, 1981.
- Berthoff, Ann E. Reclaiming the Imagination: Philosophical Perspectives for Writers and Teachers of Writing. Montclair, N.J.: Boynton/Cook Publishers, 1984.
- Berthoff, Ann E., and James Stephens. Forming, Thinking, Writing. 2nd ed. Portsmouth, NH: Boynton/Cook Publishers, 1988.
- Berthoff, Ann E. The Mysterious Barricades: Language and Its Limits. Toronto, Ont.: University of Toronto Press, 1999.

=== Articles ===
- "The Problem of Problem Solving." College Composition and Communication 22.3 (1971), 237-242.
- "From Problem-solving to a Theory of Imagination." College English 33.6 (1972), 636-649.
- Response to Janice Lauer, "Counterstatement." College Composition and Communication 23.5 (1972), 414-416.
- "Recalling Another Freudian Model-- A Consumer Caveat." CEA Critic 35.4 (1973), 12-14.
- "Reclaiming the Imagination." Freshman English News 3.3 (1975), 13-14.
- Response to "The Students' Right to Their Own Language." College Composition and Communication 26.2 (1975), 216-217.
- "Towards a Pedagogy of Knowing." Freshman English News 7.1 (1978), 1-4, 12-13.
- "Tolstoy, Vygotsky, and the Making of Meaning." College Composition and Communication 29.3 (1978), 249-255.
- (With Warner Berthoff). "Staying Viable." College Composition and Communication 31.1 (1980), 84-86.
- "I.A. Richards and the Philosophy of Rhetoric." Rhetoric Society Quarterly 10.4 (1980), 195-210.
- "Marvell's Stars, Schubert's Suns, Chekhov's Pipe: Recognizing the Interpreting Metaphor." The Sewanee Review 89.1 (1981), 57-82.
- A Comment on "When Paraphrase Fails." College English 44.4 (1982), 434-435.
- "I.A Richards and the Audit of Meaning." New Literary History 14.1 (1982), 63-79.
- Response to Catherine Belsey. New Literary History 14.1 (1982), 185-186.
- "A Comment on Inquiry and Composing." College English 45.6 (1983), 605-606.
- Response to Richard Gebhardt, "Writing Processes, Revision, and Rhetorical Problems: A Note on Three Recent Articles." College Composition and Communication 35.1 (1984), 95.
- "Facets: The Most Important Development in the Last Five Years for High School Teachers of Composition." (Panel) The English Journal 73.5 (1984), 20-23.
- "Is Teaching Still Possible? Writing, Meaning, and Higher Order Reasoning." College English 46.8 (1984), 743-755.
- Review of The Politics of Education: Culture, Power, and Liberation by Paulo Freire. The Journal of Education 167.1 (1985), 140-143.
- A Comment on "The Purification of Literature and Rhetoric." College English 50.1 (1988), 95-96.
- "From Mencius on the Mind to Coleridge on Imagination." Rhetoric Society Quarterly 18.2 (1988), 163-166.
- Review of Freire for the Classroom: A Sourcebook for Liberatory Teaching by Ira Shor. College Composition and Communication 39.3 (1988), 359-360.
- "Review: I.A. Richards: Fox or Hedgehog?" The Cambridge Quarterly 19.3 (1990), 279-285. More extended version in Rhetoric Review 8.2 (1990), 354-360. Another version, "The World, The Text, and the Reader: I.A. Richards's Hermeneutics." Modern Philology 88.2 (1990), 166-173.
- A Comment on "Composing, Uniting, Transacting: Whys and Ways of Connections Reading and Writing." College English 52.3 (1990), 343.
- "Paulo Freire's Liberation Pedagogy." Language Arts 67.4 (1990), 362-369.
- "Rhetoric as Hermeneutic." College Composition and Communication 42.3 (1991), 279-287.
- Review of Sign, Textuality, World by Floyd Merrell; Royce's Mature Ethics by Royce by Frank M. Oppenheim; Santayana, Pragmatism, and the Spiritual Life by Henry Samuel Levinson. Religion and Literature 25.3 (1993), 67-75.
- "What Works? How Do We Know?" Journal of Basic Writing 12.2 (1993), 3-17.
- Introductory Remarks. College Composition and Communication 45.2 (1994), 237-238.
- "Walker Percy's Castaway." The Sewanee Review 102.3 (1994), 409-423.
- Two Comments on "Assigning Places: The Function of Introductory Composition as a Cultural Discourse." College English 56.7 (1994), 841-844.
- "Problem-Dissolving by Triadic Means." College English 58.1 (1996), 9-21.
- "Reclaiming the Active Mind." College English 61.1 (1999), 671-680.
- Review: Some Versions of Empson. The Sewanee Review 115.2 (2007), 293-300.
- Review: A Trained Imagination. The Sewanee Review 115.2 (2007).
- Review: The Last Days of a Secular Priest. The Sewanee Review 116.3 (2008).
- Review: Mad Doctors as Scientists. The Sewanee Review 118.1 (2010), 144-149.
- "Coming to Canna." The Sewanee Review 118.4 (2010), 496-511.
- "Kindred Spirits: Kathleen Raine and Margaret Fay Shaw." The Sewanee Review 120.1 (2012), 91-102.
- Review: On the Roof of Scotland. The Sewanee Review 120.3 (2012).
- Review: Warfare and Art. The Sewanee Review 121.1 (2013).
- "Remembering Joseph Frank." The Sewanee Review 121.3 (2013), 496-499.
- "Homiletic Silence and the Revival of Conversation." The Sewanee Review 122.4 (2014), 585-591.
- "Libraries Here and There." The Sewanee Review 123.3 (2016), 490-492.
