= Diane Davis =

American philosopher

Diane Davis (born 5 or 15 July 1963) is a post-structuralist rhetorician and professor of Rhetoric and Writing, English, and Communication Studies at the University of Texas at Austin. She was the Director of the Digital Writing and Research Lab at UT from 2009 to 2017, and is now the chair of the Department of Rhetoric and Writing. She holds the Kenneth Burke Chair of Rhetoric and Philosophy at the European Graduate School in Saas-Fee, Switzerland, where she teaches intensive summer seminars on Jacques Derrida and Emmanuel Levinas.

== Early life ==
Davis was born in Wichita Falls, Texas and grew up in Clear Lake City, near Houston. She attended a less known, liberal arts college in Texas where she double majored in English and physical education/kinesiology. Following her graduation from there, Diane Davis enrolled into the University of Texas at Arlington and obtained her doctorate in humanities with a concentration in rhetorical theory in 1995. She also did her habilitation in media and communication at the European Graduate School in 2003.

== Career ==
From 1995 to 1997, Davis taught in the English Department at Old Dominion University, was a teacher at the Rhetoric Department of the University of Iowa from 1997 to 2001, and since 2001 works at the University of Texas at Austin as a Professor of Rhetoric and Writing.

Her work is situated at the intersections of rhetorical theory, continental philosophy, and digital culture.

== Avital Ronell sexual harassment case ==
On May 11, 2018, Diane Davis with a group of scholars in signed a letter to New York University following the sexual harassment suit filed by former NYU graduate student Nimrod Reitman against his advisor Avital Ronell. The signatories acknowledged not having had access to the confidential findings of the investigation that followed Reitman's Title IX complaint against Ronell. Nonetheless, they falsely accused Reitman of waging a "malicious campaign" against Ronell. The signatories also wrote that Reitman's "malicious intention has animated and sustained this legal nightmare" for a highly regarded scholar. "If she were to be terminated or relieved of her duties, the injustice would be widely recognized and opposed."

Davis is quoted from an email to The New York Times as saying "I am of course very supportive of what Title IX and the #MeToo movement are trying to do, of their efforts to confront and to prevent abuses, for which they also seek some sort of justice. But it's for that very reason that it's so disappointing when this incredible energy for justice is twisted and turned against itself, which is what many of us believe is happening in this case." Davis clarified her defense of Ronell after Avital Ronell was found by NYU to have sexually harassed former male graduate student Nimrod Reitman.

== Books ==
- Inessential Solidarity: Rhetoric and Foreigner Relations. University of Pittsburgh Press, 2010. ISBN 0-8229-6122-9
- Reading Ronell. Edited collection with an introduction. University of Illinois Press, 2009. ISBN 0-252-07647-8
- Women's Ways of Making It In Rhetoric and Composition. With Michelle Ballif and Roxanne Mountford. Routledge, 2008. ISBN 0-8058-4445-7
- The UberReader: Selected Works of Avital Ronell. Edited collection with introduction. University of Illinois Press, 2008. ISBN 0-252-07311-8
- Breaking Up [at] Totality: A Rhetoric of Laughter. Rhetorical Theory and Philosophy Series. Southern Illinois University Press, 2000. ISBN 0-8093-2228-5

== Special Issue ==
- Philosophy and Rhetoric. Special Issue on "Extrahuman Rhetorical Relations: Addressing the Animal, the Object, the Dead, and the Divine." Co-edited with Michelle Ballif. Vol 47.4, 2014.

== Selected articles ==
- "Rhetoricity at the End of the World." Philosophy and Rhetoric 50.4 (2017): 431–45.
- "Autozoography: Notes Toward a Rhetoricity of the Living." Philosophy and Rhetoric 47.4 (2014): 532–352.
- "Breaking Down Man." An interview with Avital Ronell. Philosophy and Rhetoric 47.4 (2014): 354–387.
- "Writing-Being: Another Look at the 'Symbol-Using Animal.'" Writing Posthumanism, Posthuman Writing. Ed. Sidney Dobrin. Parlor Press, 2015. 56–78.
- "Performative Perfume." Performatives After Deconstruction. Ed. Mauro Senatore. London: Bloomsbury Publishing, 2013. p 70–85.
- "Creaturely Rhetorics." Philosophy and Rhetoric. Special forum on rhetoric and the question of the animal. Philosophy and Rhetoric 44.1 (2011): 88–94.
- "Greetings: On Levinas and the Wagging Tail." JAC: A Journal of Composition Theory. Special issue on Levinas. 29.1 (2009): 711–748.
- "Identification: Burke and Freud on Who You Are." Rhetoric Society Quarterly 38.2 (2008): 123–147.
- "The Fifth Risk: A Response to John Muckelbauer's Response." Philosophy and Rhetoric 40.2 (2007): 248–256.
- "Addressing Alterity: Rhetoric, Hermeneutics, and the Non-Appropriative Relation." Philosophy and Rhetoric 38.3 (2005): 191–212.
- "Diogenes of Sinope." With Victor J. Vitanza. Classical Rhetorics and Rhetoricians. Eds. Michelle Ballif and Michael G. Moran. Praeger Publishers, 2005. 132–136.
- "Finitude's Clamor; Or, Notes Toward a Communitarian Literacy." College Composition and Communication 53.1 (Sept. 2001): 119–145.
- "Toward an Ethics of Listening." With Michelle Ballif and Roxanne Mountford. JAC: A Journal of Composition Theory 20.4 (2000): 931–942.
- "Negotiating the Differend: A Feminist Trilogue." With Michelle Ballif and Roxanne Mountford. JAC: A Journal of Composition Theory 20.3 (2000): 583–625.
- "Confessions of an Anacoluthon: Avital Ronell on Writing, Technology, Pedagogy, Politics." JAC: Journal of Composition Theory 20.2 (2000): 243–281.
- "Addicted to Love; Or, Toward an Inessential Solidarity." JAC: A Journal of Composition Theory 19.4 (1999): 633–656.
