= Bob Brown (writer) =

American poet

Robert Brown
- Born: June 14, 1886; Oak Park, Illinois, United States
- Died: August 7, 1959 (aged 73); New York City, New York, United States
- Occupations: Writer, poet, publisher
- Spouse(s): Lillian Fox Brown; Rose Watson Brown; Eleanor Wilson Parker Brown
- Writing career
- Genre: 2329021643
- Notable works: What Happened to Mary; The Remarkable Adventures of Christopher Poe; My Marjonary; The Readies; The Complete Book of Cheese
- Literary movement: Modernism, Avant-Garde

Robert Carlton Brown II (June 14, 1886 – August 7, 1959) was an American writer and publisher in many forms from comic squibs to magazine fiction to advertising to avant-garde poetry to business news to cookbooks to political tracts to novelized memoirs to parodies and much more.

== Life and work ==
In the first two decades of the twentieth century, Brown was a bestselling fiction writer and found great commercial success selling his stories to magazines, as well as novelizations of serialized magazines stories, including What Happened to Mary (1913) and The Remarkable Adventures of Christopher Poe (1913). He also published bohemian poetry when he and his second wife, Rose, became central figures in the Greenwich Village bohemian arts and culture scene. As part of his work with The Masses, Brown also became a fund-raising impresario staging balls and costume parties at Webster Hall.

With the start of World War I, the Browns were forced into exile, first to Mexico for a year with other war resisters called Slackers. Later they eventually made their way to Brazil where they started an international business news publishing empire. Using the profits from their business, they traveled around the world in the mid-1920s, spending about a year in China. In 1928, they located to Europe to join the expatriate avant-garde group in France, which included Gertrude Stein, Kay Boyle, and Nancy Cunard. They entertained cultural figures from Emma Goldman to Charlie Chaplin. Brown founded Roving Eye Press, a press dedicated to publishing mostly his own experimental writings. His most famous works at this time include his manifestos and experimental demonstrations, including in The Readies (1930) and Words (1931), for his reading machine and the processed texts that would revolutionize reading.

With the economic depression in the 1930s, the Browns, including Bob's mother Cora, Rose, and Bob, eventually moved back to the United States writing bestselling cookbooks to make a living . They wrote over twenty cookbooks, such as Cooking with Wine (1934), 10,000 Snacks (1934), and The Complete Book of Cheese (1955). The Browns simultaneously worked on a commune, and joined the faculty at the radical Commonwealth College; Bob also helped start the Writer's Guild and organized summer writing trips to the Soviet Union.

In the 1940s, after Cora died, Bob and Rose became writers in Hollywood; they wrote numerous story treatments for the movie industry, and used advances and fees to fund travel to the Amazon. They published a colorful memoir about their travels and collected artifacts, which they later donated to museums in Brazil and the United States (in Los Angeles). They eventually moved back to Brazil in the mid-1940s, and Rose published a few young adult history books.

In the mid-1950s, Bob moved back to the United States after Rose died. He married his old friend Eleanor Parker, and they restarted Roving Eye Press as well as publishing cookbooks, selling rare and unusual books, and publishing works with the Beat poets.

== Legacy ==
In his manifesto to The Readies, Bob Brown wrote, "The written word hasn't kept up with the age . . . We have the talkies, but as yet no Readies." Brown has been called the "Godfather of the E-Reader" by Jennifer Schuessler. In his monograph Black Riders, Jerome McGann refers to him as "the visual tradition's most important modernist practitioner and theorist". Scholars Craig Dworkin and Michael North have also situated Brown's work in relation to the traditions of experimental poetry and photography and cinema respectively.

In 2014, scholars Craig Saper and K. A. Wisniewski restarted Brown's Roving Eye Press with a group of scholars, artists, and Brown descendants. Saper had previously written numerous articles on Brown and aesthetics, publishing and reading and had even created a digital simulation of Brown's concept for a reading machine. With this global collective in place, the small press started to reprint a number of Brown's most experimental works from the 1930s, including The Readies, Words, Gems: A Censored Anthology, 1450-1950, and Houdini. The press also offered selected publications for free download on their website and has been noted for its advocacy for open access. Roving Eye Press is managed by Wisniewski and O. U. Kidd, and Saper was solicited to write new introductions to each title in the first series of titles published. In 2016, Saper published the first biography of Brown entitled, The Amazing Adventures of Bob Brown: A Real-Life Zelig Who Wrote His Way Through the 20th Century.

== Bibliography ==
- The Remarkable Adventures of Christopher Poe (1913)
- What Happened to Mary: A Novelization from the Play and the Stories Appearing in the Ladies' World (1913)
- My Marjonary (1916)
- 1450-1950 (1929)
- Globe-Gliding (1930)
- The Readies (1930/2014)
- 1450-1950 (1930/2015)
- Demonics (1931)
- Gems, a Censored Anthology (1931/2014)
- Nomadness (1931)
- Readies for Bob Brown's Machine (1931)
- Words: I but Bend My Finger in a Beckon and Words, Birds of Words, Hop on It, Chirping (1931/2014)
- Let There Be Beer! (1932)
- You Gotta Live (1932)
- Toward a Bloodless Revolution (1933)
- Homemade Hilarity (1938)
- Can We Co-Operate? (1940)
- The Complete Book of Cheese (1955)

With Rose and Cora Brown

- The European Cookbook for American Homes (1936)
- 10,000 Snacks; a Cookbook of Canapés, Savories, Relishes, Hors D'oeuvres, Sandwiches, and Appetizers for before, after, and between Meals (1937)
- Most for Your Money Cookbook (1938)
- Salads and Herbs (1938)
- Soups, Sauces and Gravies (1939)
- The Wining and Dining Quiz; a Banquet of 299 Questions and Answers from Soup to Nuts (1939)
- The Vegetable Cook Book; from Trowel to Table (1939)
- America Cooks; Practical Recipes from 48 States (1940)
- Fish & Sea Food Cook Book (1940)
- Outdoor Cooking (1940)
- The Wine Cook Book (1941)
- The South American Cook Book (1945)
