= Edward P. J. Corbett =

American rhetorician, educator and author

Edward P.J. Corbett
- Born: October 29, 1919; Jamestown, North Dakota
- Died: June 24, 1998 (aged 78); Columbus, Ohio
- Education: Loyola University, Chicago, PhD; University of Chicago, MA; Marquette University, BA
- Occupation: English professor
- Parent(s): John Thomas Corbett; Adrienne Marie Anne Beaupre

Edward P.J. Corbett (October 29, 1919 – June 24, 1998) was an American rhetorician, educator, and scholarly author. Corbett chaired the 1970 Conference on College Composition and Communication, and was chair of the organization and a member of the National Council of Teachers of English Executive Committee in 1971. He was also chair of the Rhetoric Society of America from 1973 to 1977. From 1974 to 1979, he was editor of the journal College Composition and Communication. He is known for promoting classical rhetoric among composition scholars and teachers.

== Life ==
=== Early years and discovery of rhetoric ===
Edward Patrick Joseph Corbett was born in Jamestown, North Dakota. His father worked for Northern Pacific Railroad, then later delivered milk in Los Angeles, California. When Corbett's parents separated, Corbett was sent to Milwaukee, Wisconsin to live with his father and paternal grandmother. His father worked briefly with the WPA during the Depression.

In 1934, Corbett receive a scholarship to attend Marquette University High School, a Jesuit institution. There, Corbett learned Latin and Greek. Upon graduating in 1938, Corbett decided to become a priest and went to Venard College where he earned a degree in philosophy. Eventually Corbett decided not to become a priest and left the school in 1943.

After a brief stint work at the Schlitz Brewing Company, Corbett joined the Marines. He trained as a radio technician and received training at Wright Junior College and Ward Island. In 1945, Corbett was sent to Majuro Island; he later was stationed at Pearl Harbor and Qingdao. After his service, Corbett went to the University of Chicago, where he got a master's degree in literature in 1948.

While working at Creighton University (another Jesuit institution), Corbett chanced upon Hugh Blair's Lectures on Rhetoric and Belles Lettres in the library which stimulated Corbett's interest in rhetoric. Corbett went to the Jesuit Loyola University Chicago for his doctorate degree; his dissertation was "Hugh Blair: A Study of His Rhetorical Theory." In 1956, after completing his Ph.D., Corbett returned to Creighton University.

=== The revival of rhetoric ===
Corbett's classroom experience informed his research. Many of the examples of schemes and tropes he would later use in Classical Rhetoric for the Modern Student, his most famous textbook, were collected by students in Corbett's Creighton courses. Corbett also began attending the Conference on College Composition and Communication. After presenting on New Rhetorics at that conference ("The Usefulness of Classical Rhetoric"), Corbett published Classical Rhetoric for the Modern Student. Corbett continued to argue for the importance of classical rhetoric for composition studies. His articles from this period include "Rhetoric and Teachers of English," and "Rhetoric in the Senior High School" (with Ruth Anderson). He also led National Endowment for the Humanities seminars and Summer Rhetoric Seminars.

Corbett moved to The Ohio State University in 1966 to serve as Director of Freshman English. While Corbett appreciated literature, he promoted the teaching of writing in writing courses. Corbett remained a strong supporter basing composition studies in rhetoric. Articles from this period include "What is Being Revived?", "A New Look at Old Rhetoric," "The Relevance of Rhetoric to Composition," "The Theory and Practice of Imitation in Classical Rhetoric," "Rhetoric, the Enabling Discipline," and "Rhetoric, Whether Goest Thou?" These works argued for the relevance of rhetoric, including its relevance to other fields of study.

=== Later life ===
In the 1980s Corbett returned to do more work in the history of rhetoric. His works from this period include "Some Rhetorical Lessons from John Henry Newman," "John Locke's Contributions to Rhetoric," "Isocrates' Legacy: The Humanistic Strand in Classical Rhetoric, "The Classical Paideia in the Ancient Greek and Roman Schools," "Classical Rhetoric: The Basic Issues," and "The Cornell School of Rhetoric." This last piece explored the revival of rhetoric in Speech Departments before the beginning of Corbett's advocacy.

As a result of his work, the Edward P. J. Corbett Award is named after him. In 1982 Thomas Willard singled out Corbett as an outstanding "contemporary rhetorician." He was the CCCC Exemplar Awardee in 1996. His students include Andrea Lunsford, Lisa Ede, Robert Connors, Gail Hawisher, Cheryl Glenn, Krista Radcliffe, and Sheryl Finkle.

Corbett died on June 24, 1998, at his home in Columbus, Ohio.

== Works ==
- "Approaches to the Study of Style." Teaching Composition: Twelve Bibliographical Essays. Ed. Gary Tate. Fort Worth, TX: Texas Christian UP, 1987.83-130.
- "The Changing Strategies of Argumentation from Ancient to Modem Times." Practical Reasoning in Human Affairs. Ed. J. L. Golden and J. J. Pilotta. Dordrecht, Holland: D. Reidel Publishing, 1986. 21–35. Rpt. in Selected Essays 323–40.
- "The Classical Paideia in the Ancient Greek and Roman Schools." National Endowment for the Humanities Seminar. Beaver College. Philadelphia, 1985. Rpt. in Selected Essays 279–88.
- "Classical Rhetoric: The Basic Issues." Univ. of Rhode Island. March 1988.
- Classical Rhetoric for the Modem Student. NY: Oxford UP, 1965. 2nd ed., 1971. 3rd ed., 1990.
- "The Cornell School of Rhetoric." Rhetoric Review 4 (Sept. 1985): 4–14. Rpt. in Selected Essays 290–304.
- "Do It Yourself." College English 22 (April 1961): 507–8.
- "The Ethical Dimensions of Rhetoric." Northern Illinois University, Dekalb, IL. 1984. Rpt. in Selected Essays 255–67.
- "How Did Rhetoric Acquire the Reputation of Being the Art of Flim-Flam?" The Ohio State University, Columbus, Ohio. 16 January 1987. "Hugh Blair: A Study of His Rhetorical Theory." Diss. Loyola, 1956.
- "Hugh Blair as an Analyzer of English Prose Style." College Composition and Communication 9 (May 1958): 98–103. Rpt. in Selected Essays 4–13.
- "Hugh Blair’s Three (?) Critical Dissertations." Notes and Queries, NS 1 (November 1954): 478–80.
- "If I Speak with Forked Tongue___" North Dakota English 1 (Winter 1976): 3–14.
- "Is Composition Decomposing?" Minnesota English Journal 13 (Fall 1977): 26–47.
- "John Locke’s Contributions to Rhetoric." College Composition and Communication 32 (Dec. 1981): 423–33. Rpt. in Selected Essays 226–40.
- "Literature and Composition: Allies or Rivals in the Classroom?" Composition and Literature: Bridging the Gap. Ed. Winifred Bryan Horner. Chicago: U of Chicago P, 1983. 168–84.
- The Little English Handbook: Choices and Conventions. NY: Wiley, 1973. 2nd ed., 1977. 3rd ed., 1980.
- The Little Rhetoric. NY: Wiley, 1977.
- The Little Rhetoric and Handbook. 1977. 2nd ed. Glenview, IL: Scott, Foresman, 1982.
- "A Method of Analyzing Prose Style with a Demonstration Analysis of Swift’s A Modest Proposal." Reflections on High School English: NDÉA Institute Lectures 1965. Ed. Gary Tate. Tulsa, OK: U of Tulsa, 1966. Rpt. in Selected Essays 23–47.
- "A New Look at Old Rhetoric." Rhetoric: Theories for Application. Papers Presented at the 1965 Convention of the National Council of Teachers of English. Ed. Robert M. Gorrell. Champaign, IL: NCTE, 1967. 16–22. Rpt. in Selected Essays 63–72.
- "Public Doublespeak: If I Speak with Forked Tongue " English Journal 65 (April 1976): 16–17.
- "The Relevance of Rhetoric to Composition." Kentucky English Bulletin 17 (Winter 1967–68): 3–12.
- "Rhetoric and Teachers of English." Quarterly Journal of Speech 51 (Dec. 1965): 375–81. "Rhetoric in Search of a Past, Present, and Future." The Prospect of Rhetoric. Ed. Lloyd F. Bitzer and Edwin Black. Englewood Cliffs, NJ: Prentice- Hall, 1971. 167–78.
- "The Rhetoric of the Open Hand and the Rhetoric of the Closed Fist." College Composition and Communication 20 (Dec. 1969): 288–96. Rpt. in Selected Essays 99–113.
- "Rhetoric, the Enabling Discipline." Ohio English Bulletin 13 (May 1972): 2- 10. Rpt. in Selected Essays 194–208.
- "Rhetoric, Whether Goest Thou?" A Symposium in Rhetoric. Ed. J. Dean Bishop, Turner S. Kohler, and William E. Tanner. Denton, TX: Texas Women's U, 1975. 44–57. Rpt. in Rhetoric and Change. Ed. William E. Tanner and J. Dean Bishop. Mesquite, TX: Ide House, 1982. 15–30.
- Rhetorical Analyses of Literary Works. NY: Oxford UP, 1969.
- Selected Essays of Edward P. J. Corbett. Ed. Robert J. Connors. Dallas: Southern Methodist UP, 1989.
- "Some Rhetorical Lessons from John Henry Newman," College Composition and Communication 31 (Dec. 1980): 402–12.
- "Teaching Style." The Territory of Language: Linguistics, Stylistics, and the Teaching of Composition. Ed. Donald A. McQuade. Carbondale, IL: Southern Illinois UP, 1986. 23–33.
- "The Theory and Practice of Imitation in Classical Rhetoric." College Composition and Communication 22 (Oct. 1971): 243–50. Rpt. in Selected Essays 179–91.
- "The Topoi Revisited." Rhetoric and Praxis: The Contribution of Classical Rhetoric to Practical Reasoning. Ed. Jean Dietz Moss. Washington, D C.: The Catholic U of America P, 1986. 43–57.
- "The Usefulness of Classical Rhetoric." College Composition and Rhetoric 14 (Oct. 1963): 162–64. Rpt. in Selected Essays 16–21.
- "Ventures in Style." Reinventing the Rhetorical Tradition. Ed. Aviva Freedman and Ian Pringle. Ottawa: Canadian Council of Teachers of English, 1980. 79–87.
- "What Is Being Revived?" College Composition and Communication 18 (Oct. 1967): 166–72. Rpt. in Selected Essays 49–60.
- "Where Are the Snows of Yesteryear? Has Rhetoric Come a Long Way in the Last Twenty-Five Years?" Visions of Rhetoric: History, Theory, and Criticism. Ed. Charles W. Kneupper. Arlington, TX: Rhetoric Society of America, 1987. Rpt. \u Selected Essays 343–57.
- (With Ruth Anderson). "Rhetoric in the Senior High School." Breakthrough 1 (May 1966): 25–28.
