= Mirror theory =

In theoretical linguistics, mirror theory refers to a particular approach to the architecture of the language organ developed by Michael Brody, who claims his theory to be purely representational (unlike most of the current generative theories that are either derivational or combining derivation and representation).

== Phrase structure ==
There are several important respects in which mirror theory is different from more traditional theories of phrase structure in generative linguistics such as X-bar theory or bare phrase structure. The first principle, called mirror, states that the syntactic relation 'X complement of Y' is identical to an inverse-order morphological relation 'X specifier of Y'. Thus, the notions of 'syntactic' and 'morphological' specifiers and complements are crucial for the linearisation of syntactic structure and its mapping to the morphological component.

When the structure is pronounced, it linearises in the following order: specifiers precede heads, and heads precede their complements. So when a sentence like that in the diagram below is pronounced, 'John' precedes the V-v-T chain, which in turn precedes 'Mary', the latter being the specifier of V. However, English is a VO language, which means that the morphological word 'loves' associated with the V-v-T chain is spelled in v, deriving the correct word order.

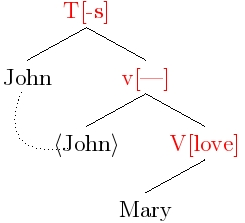

Adger, D., Harbour, D., and Watkins, L. Mirrors and Microparameters: Phrase Structure beyond Free Word Order

Brody, M. Mirror Theory

== The mirror principle in distributed morphology ==
Similar to mirror theory is the mirror principle of the distributed morphology framework which deals primarily with issues of affix ordering. In the model of Distributed Morphology, the underlying assumption is such that all morphemes in a morphologically complex word are effectually "leaves" on a syntactic tree. These syntactic "leaves" undergo operations that lead to the build-up of words, meaning that word-formation is subject to the same principles that govern the syntactic build-up of sentences. The mirror principle surmises that a complex word is generated in a derivation where the root of a given word merges lower than all subsequent suffixes that attach to that word. These suffixes immediately c-command the root word and are ordered in accordance with the principle of semantic scope. To generate the proper linear structure, left-head movement is applied recursively to include the morphemes that c-command a given root.

Empirical arguments for the Mirror Principle are provided by Baker's (1985) account for the distribution of a number of valence changing operations in Mohawk, showing that the linear order of morphemes is related to the syntactic hierarchy in that morphemes are linearized in a reverse order to how they appear in a syntactic structure. His findings are summarized in The Mirror Generalization, which states:

Morphological derivations must directly reflect syntactic derivations (and vice versa).

The generalization is observed in Baker's (1988) account for applicatives and passives in Chichewa:

Mbidzi zi-na-perek-a mpiringidzo kwa mtsikana

zebra SP-PST-hand-ASP crowbar to girl

"The zebras handed the crowbar to the girl."

Mbidzi zi-na-perek-er-a mpiringidzo mtsikana

zebra SP-PST-hand-APPL-ASP crowbar girl

"The zebras handed the girl the crowbar."

Mpiringidzo u-na-perek-edw-a kwa mtsikana ndi mbidzi

crowbar SP-PST-hand-PASS-ASP to girl by zebras

"The crowbar was handed to the girl by the zebras."

Mtsikana a-na-perek-er-edw-a mpiringidzo ndi mbidzi

girl SP-PST-hand-APPL-PASS-ASP crowbar by zebras

"The girl was handed the crowbar by the zebras."

*Mtskikana a-na-perek-edw-er-a mpiringidzo ndi mbidzi

*girl SP-PST-hand-PASS-APPL-ASP crowbar by zebras

The above examples attest the ordering of the applicative morpheme and the passive morpheme in Chichewa. In this language, applicatives may be passivized, however, passives can not be made into applicatives. Applying the Mirror Principle to this set of data, we assume that in the underlying deep structure of the syntax, all affixes that occur to the right of the lexical root perek are projected above this root in the syntax. These affixes are then adjoined to the lexical root via head-movement.

== Alternative accounts for affix ordering ==
Numerous observations in languages are also available, apart from the mirror principle. Yupik, for example, is able to account for affix order appealing entirely to semantic scope. However, semantic scope and the mirror principle are not mutually exclusive ways to account for affix ordering

Challenges to the Mirror Principle have been offered in analyses of the morpheme orders of Navajo and Cupeño by Harley (2009).
