= I heard a Fly buzz—when I died =

Poem by Emily Dickinson

"I heard a Fly buzz—when I died" is the informal name for an untitled poem by American author Emily Dickinson. In the poem, the narrator is on her deathbed as she describes the progression towards her death.

Critics have theorised a diverse range of interpretations that address the appearance of a fly in the poem. In 1978, Clarence Gohdes wrote an article in The New England Quarterly proposing that the fly be classified as a bluebottle fly. On the other hand, Eugene Hollahan from the University of North Carolina believes the representation is an "emissary of Satan". Although theories regarding the symbolism around the fly diverge, the imagery surrounding the corpse imitates that of a deathbed. The speaker reflects on the moment that she died, recalling the moment of grief as witnessed by those observing her death.

== Synopsis ==
The speaker is a corpse observing the mourners that surround her deathbed. As the mourners wait in distress, they absorb the final moments before the speaker's death. The arrival of the "King" is anticipated to lead the speaker to heaven; the appearance of a fly, however, interposes, disrupting the speaker's transition to death. The speaker observes the sound of the fly shortly after the speaker dies.

== Analysis ==
The first line of the poem, "I heard a fly buzz– when I died–" is intended to garner the attention of the reader. Readers are said to be drawn to continue the poem, curious as to how the speaker is talking about her own death. The narrator then reflects on the moments prior to the very moment she died. The speaker's observations establish her as a character despite her death. In the second stanza, the narrator appears isolated from her surroundings, detached from people who are witnessing her death and aftermath. It is through the line, "The Stillness in the Room / Was like the Stillness in the Air – / Between the Heaves of Storm –" that the speaker's detachment from the moment she is dying is apparent. Comparing the room's stillness with the air's stillness, the author juxtaposes the narrator's death with her lifetime. The next portion of the poem is as follows:

The Eyes around – had wrung them dry –

And Breaths were gathering firm

For that last Onset– when the King

Be witnessed – in the Room –

In lines 5 through 8, the words "had wrung" are written in the past perfect tense, progressing the speaker's temporal narrative. The speaker's distant awareness progressively fades as the image describing the mourners shifts to note the appearance of a "King". This is thought to further increase the gap between the speaker's dual states of life and death. The King is thought to personify Death. The fly's subsequent appearance between the speaker's reference to the light and herself suggests that the fly serves as an obstruction to the speaker's ascension to heaven. It is theorized that Dickinson's symbolism (especially in reference to the fly) encompasses religious implications and references Christian theology. The grammatical structure of lines 11 through 13 interposes between the readers' progression of the narrative. Dickinson is thought to create a reading experience imitating the "interposed" motion of the fly. Dickinson touches on the issue of what medieval theologians termed "transitus," or transition to the afterlife, throughout her ouvre. In the nineteenth century this was known as "crossover." This particular scene has been characterized as a "homely genre" one.

Literary critics of Dickinson's poetry have recognized the mystery surrounding the usage of the word “blue” in the poem. James Connelly notes that “Under the entry “Blue” in the 1955 edition of The Oxford Universal Dictionary, one finds that “a candle is said to [burn blue] as an omen of death, or as indicating the presence of ghosts or of the Devil." It is only after the fly's interference that the speaker references its blueness, the light fades and the speaker dies. It is possible that Dickinson was referencing this same superstition.

== Form ==
Dickinson's skill in poetry has been described by Michael Ryan as “the inextricable, intricate, intimate, and constantly shifting interrelationships among them [grammar, rhythm, rhetoric, narrative] as they proceed from second to nanosecond at the warp-speed at which the brain processes language." The poem alternates between iambic trimeter and iambic tetrameter.

== Text ==
Reading of "I heard a Fly buzz when I died"

Close transcription

I heard a Fly buzz - when I died -
The Stillness in the Room
Was like the Stillness in the Air -
Between the Heaves of Storm -

The Eyes around - had wrung them dry -
And Breaths were gathering firm
For that last Onset - when the King
Be witnessed - in the Room -

I willed my Keepsakes - Signed away
What portions of me be
Assignable - and then it was
There interposed a Fly -

With Blue - uncertain - stumbling Buzz -
Between the light - and me -
And then the Windows failed - and then
I could not see to see -

First published version

DYING

I heard a fly buzz when I died;
The stillness round my form
Was like the stillness in the air
Between the heaves of storm

The eyes beside had wrung them dry,
And breaths were gathering sure
For that last onset, when the king
Be witnessed in his power.

I willed my keepsakes, signed away
What portion of me I
Could make assignable,– and then
There interposed a fly,

With blue, uncertain, stumbling buzz,
Between the light and me;
And then the windows failed and then
I could not see to see.
