= John Craig Freeman =

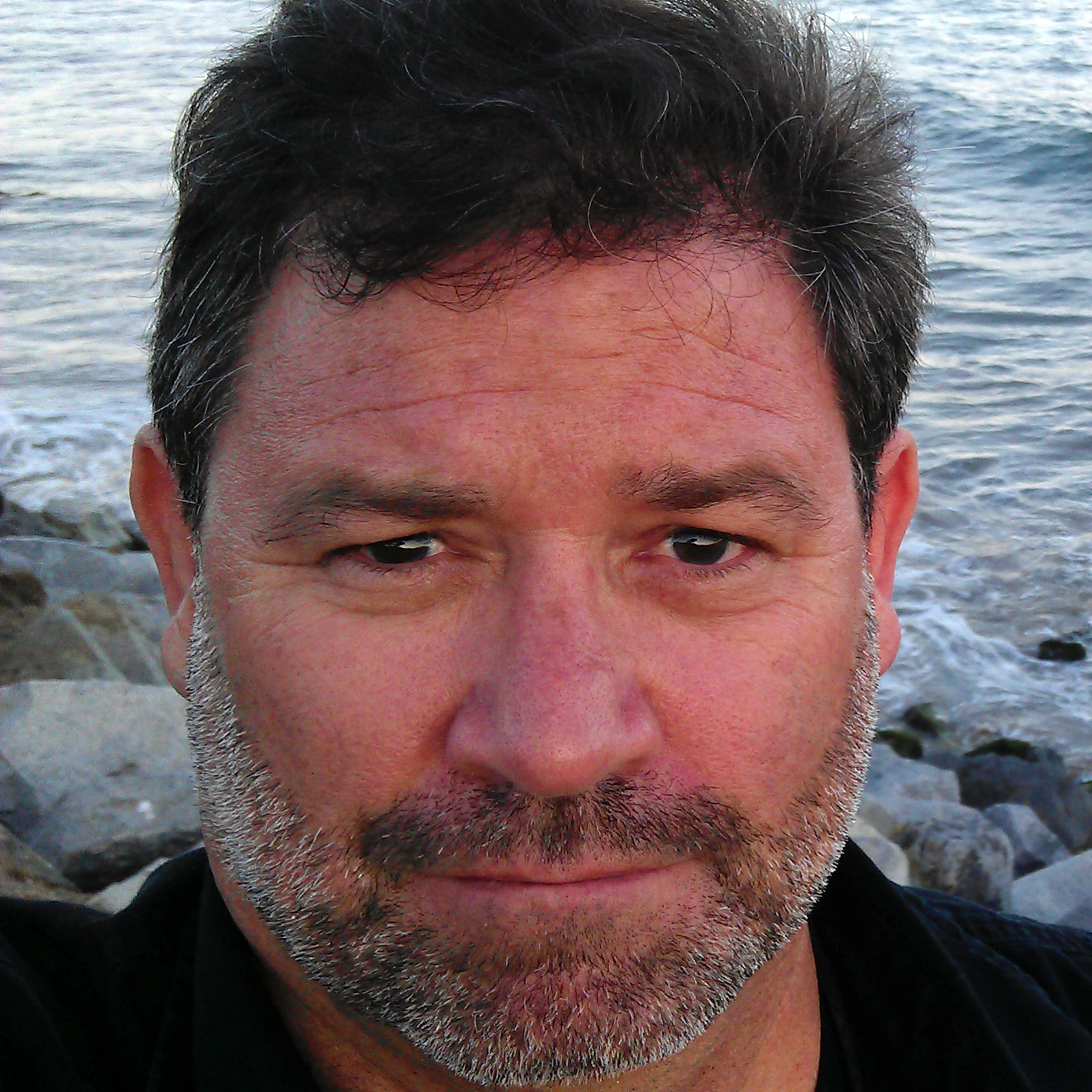
- Born: February 16, 1959 (age 67); Los Angeles, California
- Education: University of California, San Diego, University of Colorado Boulder
- Known for: Public art, new media, virtual reality and augmented reality
- Awards: NEA, Individual Artists Fellowship
- Patrons: FACT, LACMA, Rhizome, Turbulence
- Website: JohnCraigFreeman.net

John Craig Freeman (born February 16, 1959) is a contemporary artist and a professor of New Media at Emerson College in Boston.

== Education ==
Freeman received his Bachelor of Arts degree from the Visual Arts Department at the University of California, San Diego, in 1986. He received a Master of Fine Arts degree from the University of Colorado at Boulder in 1990.

== Artistic career ==
Freeman is a public artist using emergent technologies to produce large-scale public work at sites where the forces of globalization are impacting the lives of individuals in local communities. Freeman's public art has evolved from the use of billboards in the early 1990s to mixed reality installations at the turn of the century, with current work focusing on augmented reality. In a 2012 interview, Freeman stated, "My work seeks to expand the notion of public by exploring how digital networked technology is transforming our sense of place."

The following are some examples of his work.

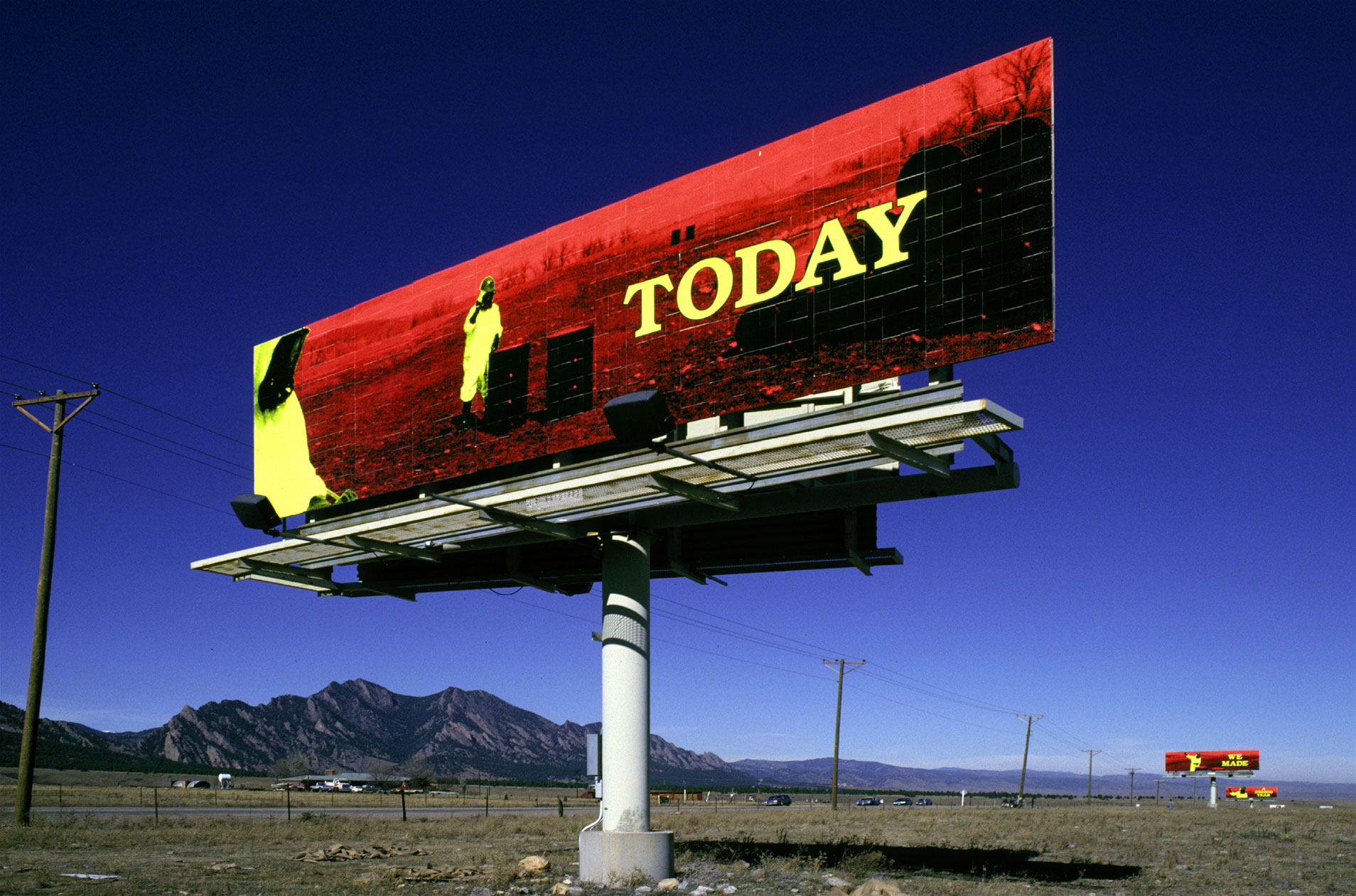
Operation Greenrun II, public art by John Craig Freeman, eleven 10′ X 40′ mosaic laser prints on billboards. Highway 93, Rocky Flats, Colorado, November, 1990 through April, 1991.

=== Operation Greenrun II, 1990 ===
Freeman's earliest work, titled Operation Greenrun II and developed as his master's thesis at the University of Colorado, used billboards to draw attention to a contaminated nuclear production facility at Rocky Flats, Colorado. In this work, eleven billboard faces were created with a message protesting the Rocky Flats site. The ensuing controversy resulted in the decision to shut down Rocky Flats for good. Writing of this project in her book titled Digital Currents: Art in the Electronic Age, Margot Lovejoy says of Freeman that he "believes that a public art can circumvent problems of the gallery system such as the commodification of culture and the perpetuation of an exclusive, elite system for art. He believes in bringing art to the public." She goes on to quote Freeman, who said that "If people are too busy to go to the gallery or museum, it makes sense to bring art to them. They don't even have to get out of their cars."

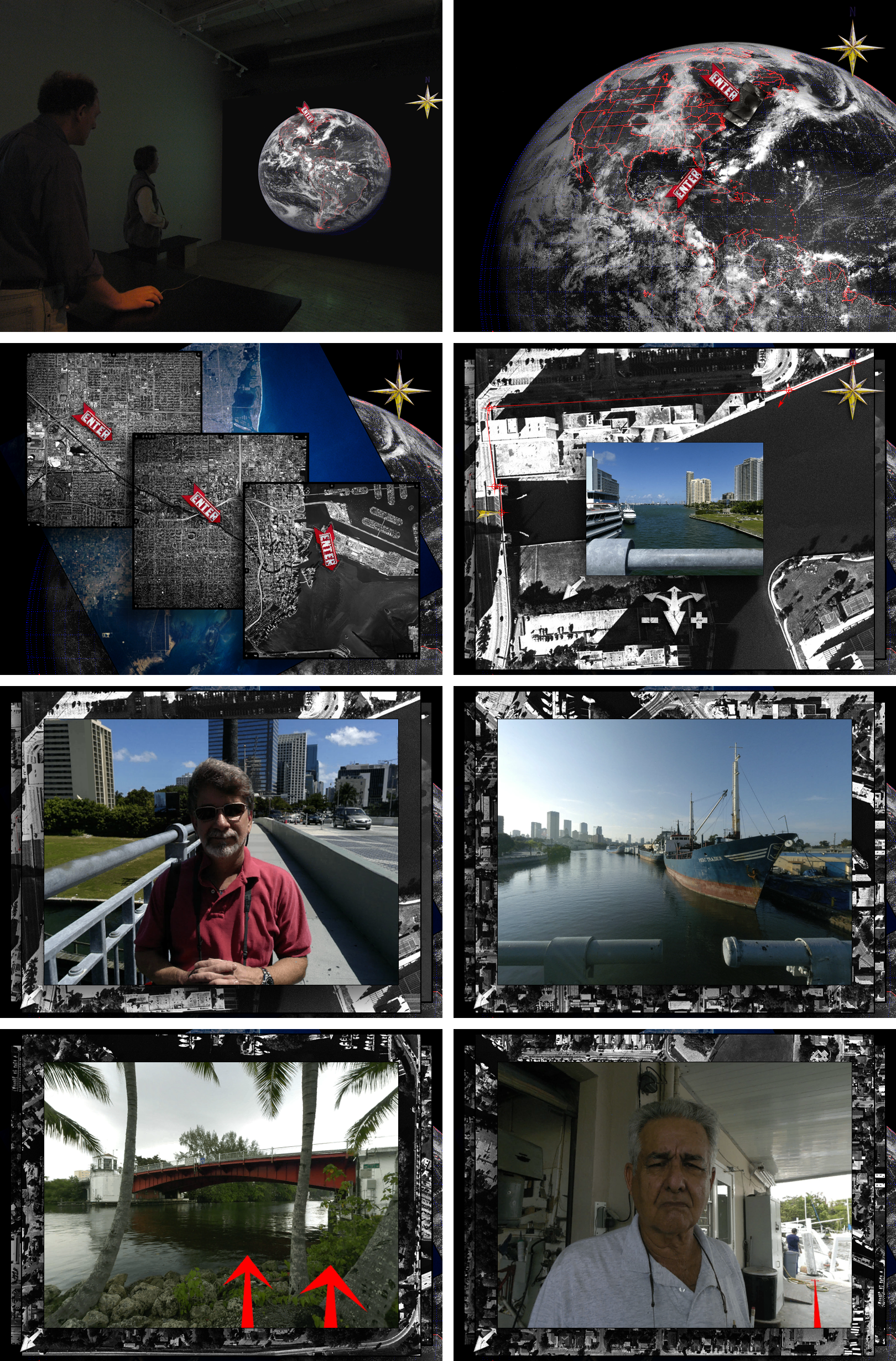
Imaging Place, by John Craig Freeman, interactive virtual reality installation, “Language/Environment,” Museum of Contemporary Art Beijing, 2007, Beijing, China.

=== Imaging Place, 1997–2010 ===
The "interventionist, political nature" of Operation Greenrun II established a pattern that has remained consistent throughout Freeman's career. This pattern can be seen in the work he titles Imaging Place, an ongoing work which employs panoramic photography in location-based projects that highlight sites affected by globalization. Locations where this work has been done include Beijing; Taipei, Taiwan; São Paulo, Brazil; the U.S./Mexico border; the Miami River; Lowell, Massachusetts; Kaliningrad, Russia; Warsaw, Poland; and Belfast, among others. His process has been called a "nonlinear documentary method."

Freeman worked on the Imaging Place: Miami River project as part of an interdisciplinary, collaborative group called the Florida Research Ensemble.

=== Augmented Reality ===
Much of Freeman's work since 2010 uses emergent forms of augmented reality as interventionist public art. He is a founding member of the international artists collective Manifest.AR.

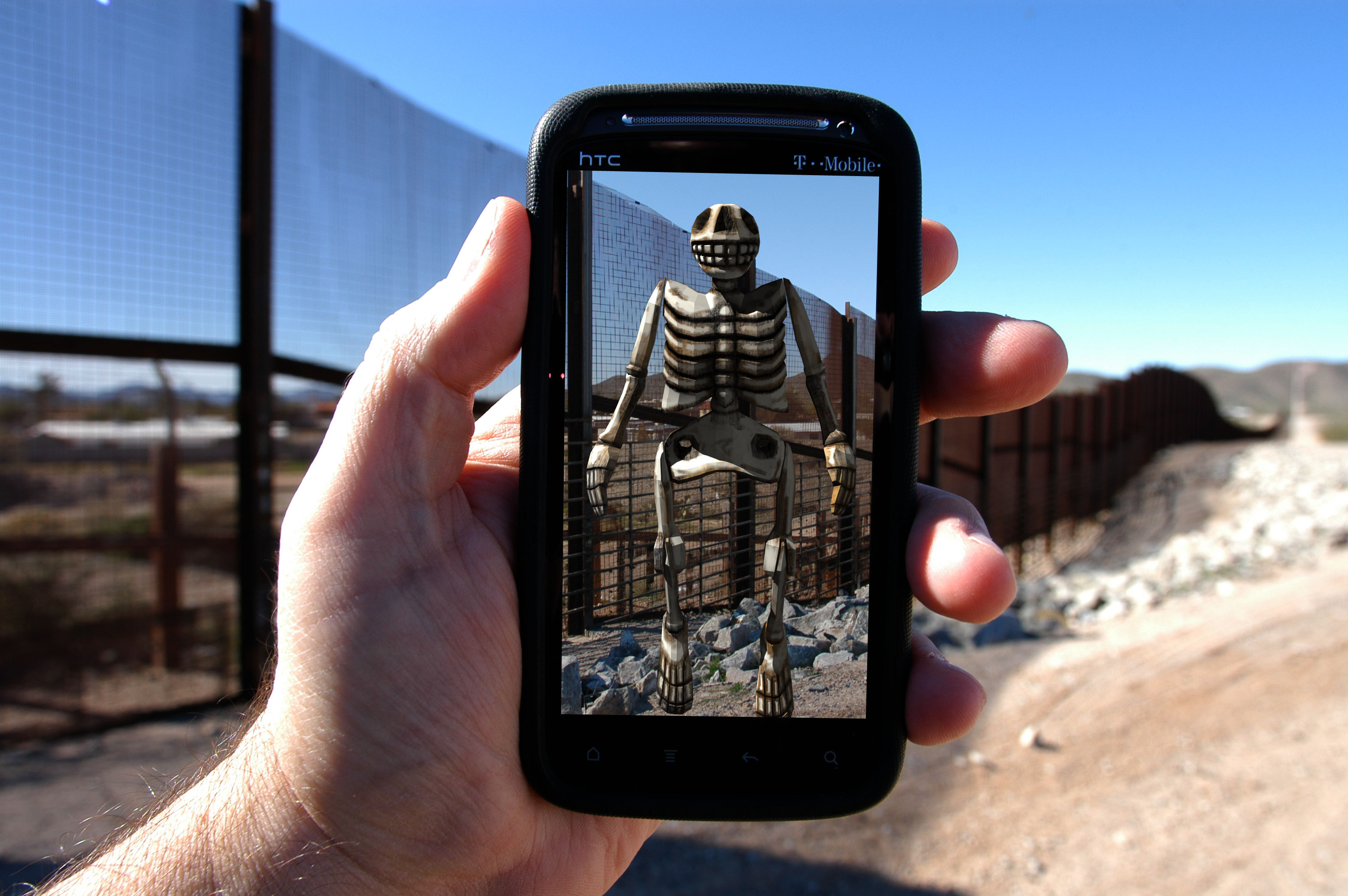
Border Memorial: Frontera de los Muertos, by John Craig Freeman, augmented reality public art, near the Lukeville, Arizona border crossing in Organ Pipe Cactus National Monument, 2012.

==== Border Memorial: Frontera de los Muertos, 2012 ====
Border Memorial: Frontera de los Muertos is an augmented reality public art project and memorial, dedicated to the thousands of migrant workers who have died along the U.S./Mexico border in recent years trying to cross the desert southwest in search of work and a better life. Built for smartphone mobile devices, this project allows people to visualize the scope of the loss of life by marking each location where human remains have been recovered with a virtual object or augmentation. The public can simply download and launch a mobile application and aim their devices’ cameras at the landscape along the border and the surrounding desert. The application uses geolocation software to superimpose individual augments at the precise GPS coordinates of each recorded death, enabling the public to see the objects integrated into the physical location as if they existed in the real world.

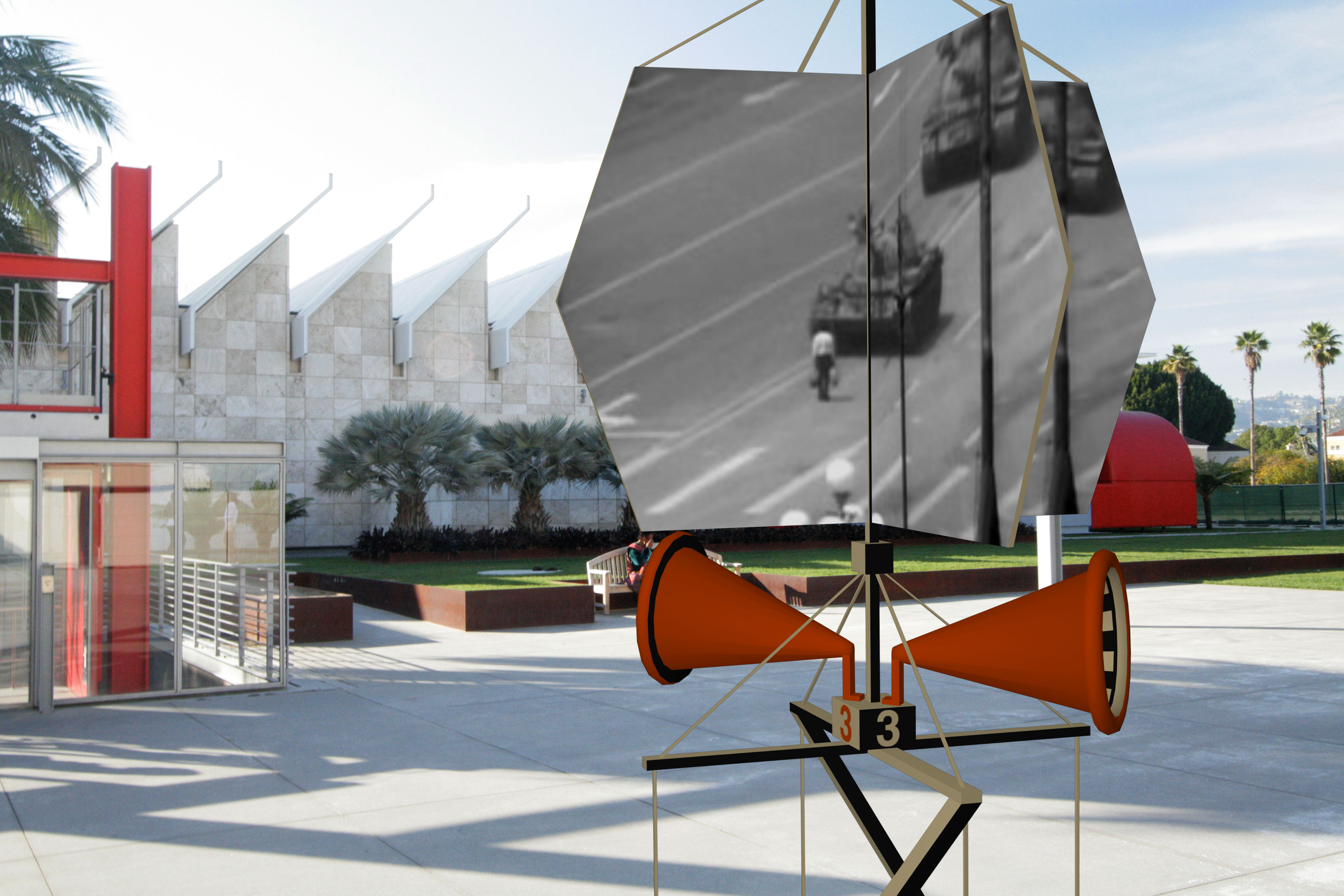
Orators, Rostrums, and Propaganda Stands: no3, by John Craig Freemanaugmented reality public art, Los Angeles County Museum of Art, 2012.

==== Orators, Rostrums, and Propaganda Stands, 2012 ====
Orators, Rostrums, and Propaganda Stands is based on the work of Gustav Klutsis, including his designs for Screen-radio Orators, Rostrums, and Propaganda Stands from 1922. Each of four virtual orators displays a black and white animation from a contemporary mass uprising: Tank Man near Tiananmen Square in Beijing in 1989; the assassination of Neda Agha-Soltan, who was gunned down in the streets of Tehran during the 2009 Iranian election protests; scenes from Tahrir Square in Cairo during the 2011 Arab Spring; and the 2011 Occupy Wall Street uprising. Each of these images is juxtaposed, in montage, with frames from the Odessa Steps scene of Sergei Eisenstein‘s historic Battleship Potemkin film. When touched, the virtual objects play sound from the uprising. The stands call up both the resurgence and nostalgia of current worldwide political idealism as they re-imagine the museum plaza in the function of the public square.

Commissioned by the Los Angeles County Museum of Art's Artists Respond program, Orators, Rostrums, and Propaganda Stands has also been exhibited at Kunsthallen Nikolaj, as part of the Conversations exhibition during the 2012 Copenhagen Art Festival and at Triennale di Milano in Milan, Italy, as part of the No Need for Real exhibition in 2012.

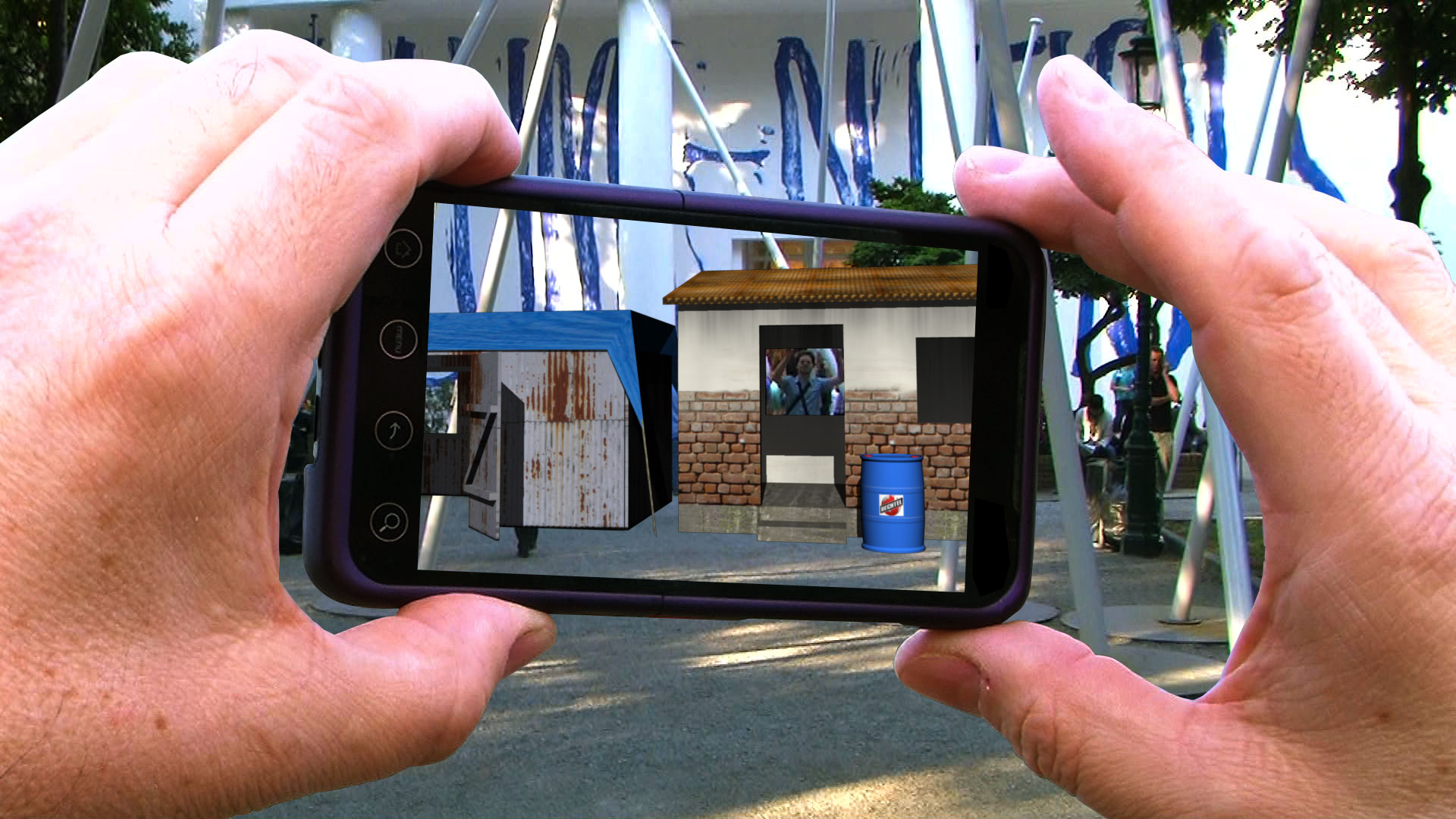
Water wARs: Giardini, by John Craig Freeman, augmented reality public art, Venice, Italy, 2011.

==== Water wARs, 2011 ====
Water wARs was an augmented reality pavilion for undocumented artists/squatters and water war refugees, which anticipates the flood of environmental refugees into the developed world caused by environmental degradation, global warming and the privatization of the world's drinking water supply by multinational corporations. Water wARs was exhibited as part of the Manifest.AR's unofficial Venice Biennial Intervention in front of the main pavilion in Giardini and in the Piazza San Marco during the 54th Venice Biennial International Art Exhibition, ILLUMInations.

=== MetroNeXt+, 2014 ===
The project exhibits a replica of a vintage New York City subway entrance that transports visitors to downtown Zurich, Switzerland's largest city. It uses augmented reality and photogrammetry technologies to display 3D models of Zurich's old town and the historic ″Augustinergasse.″ MetroNeX+ is presented by ETH Zurichhttps, Digital Art Week International, and Virtuale Switzerland.

== Academic career ==
Freeman began his academic career in the early 1990s in San Diego, where he lectured at the University Of California, San Diego, for three and a half years. He was an assistant professor at the University of Florida from 1994 to 1999, where he coordinated the photography area. From 1999 to 2002 he ran the digital media art curriculum as an associate professor in the Art Department at the University of Massachusetts Lowell. He is currently an associate professor of New Media at Emerson College in Boston. In 2012 he received a visiting scholar appointment at the Center for Research in Computing and the Arts, University of California, San Diego. In 2006 he taught as a visiting professor at Shih Hsin University, in Taipei, Taiwan. In 2011 Freeman joined the editorial board of the Public Art Dialogue.

== Publications ==
- John Craig Freeman, on behalf of ManifestAR. "ManifestAR: an augmented reality manifesto, VR Hybrids: Augmented Reality, edited by Todd Margolis, San Francisco, CA: IS&T SPIE: The Engineering Reality of Virtual Reality, #PSI82890D, 2012.
- Greg Ulmer with Barbara Jo Revelle, William Tilson and John Craig Freeman. Miami Virtue & the Ulmer Tapes Kamloops, BC, Canada: Small Cities Imprint, Vol 2, no 2, 2012.
- John Craig Freeman. "Imaging Place: Globalization and Immersive Media," Transdisciplinary Digital Art. Sound, Vision and the New Screen Digital Art Weeks and Interactive Futures, edited by Randy Adams, Steve Gibson and Stefan Muller Arisona, Berlin, Heidelberg, New York: Springer, 2008, pp. 453–466.
- John Craig Freeman. "Imaging Place: The Choragraphic Method," Imaging Place, edited by Craig Saper, W.F. Garrett-Petts, and John Craig Freeman, Rhizomes, Vol. 18, Winter, 2008.
- William Tilson and John Craig Freeman. "Place and the Electrate Situation," Rhizomes, Vol. 13., Fall, 2006.
