= Michael Brody =

Hungarian linguist

Michael Brody (born 1954) is a Hungarian linguist, and Emeritus Professor of Linguistics at University College London.

He was educated at Eötvös Loránd University, Budapest (1972-4), Université René Descartes (Sorbonne) (1974-5), University College London (1975–80) and the Massachusetts Institute of Technology (1980–82). In addition to his position at UCL, he has also been a Senior Fellow at Collegium Budapest. He is known for creating the Mirror Theory, which proposes a specific interface between syntax and morphology.
