= James Moffett =

American educator and author

James Moffett (1929–1996) was an American teacher of English, author, and theorist of the teaching and learning of language arts and especially writing.

== Biography ==
James Moffett was born in Cleveland, Ohio in 1929. After growing up in the southern US, he spent his high school years in Toledo, Ohio. He earned his undergraduate and graduate degrees from Harvard University. Drafted to serve in the military for two years shortly after graduation, and after a stint as a teaching assistant for S. I. Hayakawa, he thereafter taught at Phillips Exeter Academy for ten years. He then took a faculty position in Harvard's Graduate school of Education for three years while he worked on his first major work Teaching the Universe of Discourse.

Moffett's paired publications, Teaching the Universe of Discourse and Student-Centered Language Arts, K-12, were both initially published in 1967, and updated throughout multiple editions through 1992. Shortly after their publication and ensuing success, Houghton-Mifflin approached him about writing a textbook, and the result was an influential language-learning collection entitled Interaction, published in 1972; the most expensive education collection in history.

Prior to its adoption, the citizens of Kanawha County, West Virginia, staged violent protests over this and other textbooks. Moffett later wrote an award-winning book about the events, Storm in the Mountains: a Case Study of Censorship. The result of these protests was that almost all the state curriculum boards, not wanting to court controversy, rescinded their orders, and Houghton Mifflin abandoned the project less than a year later.

The controversy received national coverage at the time and subsequently.

After this setback, Moffett's career changed dramatically. The Interaction curriculum was reformed as Active Voice, published in 1981, and adopted as the state-wide curriculum of California for many years. After relocating to Northern California, his pedagogy began to focus on alternative education and spirituality. He continued to write several other English language learning books through the 70's, 80's, and 90's. He died from cancer in 1996.

== Bibliography ==
- Moffett, James. Interaction: A Student Centered Language Arts and Reading Program. Boston: Houghton Mifflin, 1973.
- Moffett, James. Coming on Center: English Education in Evolution. Montclair, N.J.: Boynton/Cook Publishers, 1981.
- Moffett, James. Teaching the Universe of Discourse. Portsmouth, N.H.: Boynton/Cook Publishers, 1987. In 734 libraries according to WorldCat
- Moffett, James. Active Voice: A Writing Program Across the Curriculum. Portsmouth, NH: Boynton/Cook Publishers, 1992. In 587 libraries according to WorldCat
- Moffett, James. Detecting Growth in Language. Portsmouth, NH: Boynton/Cook, 1992.
- Moffett, James. The Universal Schoolhouse: Spiritual Awakening Through Education. Portland, Me: Calendar Islands Publishers, 1998. In 441 libraries according to WorldCat
- Moffett, James. Storm in the Mountains: A Case Study of Censorship, Conflict, and Consciousness. Southern Illinois University Press, 1989. In 1058 libraries according to WorldCat
- Warnock, John. Brief Reviews of Major Works of James Moffett. The Voice, Vol. 6, No. 1, 2001.
