= Lisa Ede =

American educator and scholar (born 1948)

- Born: 1947 (age 78–79)
- Died: 2021; Corvallis, OR

Academic background
- Education: Ohio State University
- Influences: Edward P. J. Corbett, Richard O. Young, Ph. D.

Academic work
- Discipline: Composition studies; Rhetoric
- Institutions: Oregon State University

Lisa S. Ede (September 9, 1947 – September 29, 2021) was an author, editor and scholar of writing and rhetoric. She taught rhetoric and writing at Oregon State University, where she worked as a professor from 1980 to 2013. Ede has received awards for her scholarly work from the Modern Language Association, the Conference on College Composition and Communication, and the International Writing Center Association.

== Education ==
Ede attended Ohio State University, where she received a Bachelor of Science, after which she went on to earn a Master of Arts at the University of Wisconsin, Madison, before returning to Ohio State University for her PhD. At Ohio State University, Ede studied Victorian Literature and completed her dissertation on Edward Lear and Lewis Carroll. During this time, she also became interested in rhetoric and writing studies, and eventually studied under Edward P. J Corbett and Richard Young.

== Personal life ==
Ede married artist Greg Pfarr.

== Academic appointments ==
- Assistant Professor of English, State University of New York Brockport (1976–1980)
- Associate Professor of English, Oregon State University (1980–1991)
- Professor of English, Oregon State University (1991–2013)

== Books ==
- Everyone's an Author (with Andrea Lunsford, Michal Brody, Beverly J. Moss, Carole Clark Papper, and Keith Walters 2013, 2017)
- Writing Together: Collaboration in Theory and Practice (with Andrea Lunsford 2011)
- The Academic Writer: A Brief Guide for Students (2008, 2011, 2014, 2017)
- Situating Composition: Composition Studies and the Politics of Location (2004)
- Selected Essays of Robert J. Connors (with Andrea Lunsford 2003)
- On Writing Research: The Braddock Award Essays, 1975–1998 (1999)
- Singular Texts/Plural Authors: Perspectives on Collaborative Writing (with Andrea Lunsford 1990)
- Work in Progress: A Guide to Academic Writing and Revising (1989, 1992, 1995, 1998, 2001, 2004)
- Essays on Classical Rhetoric and Modern Discourse (with Robert Connors and Andrea Lunsford 1984)
