= Andrea Lunsford =

American writer and scholar

Andrea A. Lunsford
- Education: University of Florida (BA, MA); Ohio State University (PhD)
- Scientific career
- Workplaces: Stanford University; Bread Loaf School of English

Andrea A. Lunsford is an American writer and scholar who specializes in the field of composition and rhetoric studies. She is the director of the Program in Writing and Rhetoric (PWR) and the Louise Hewlett Nixon Professor of English Emerita at Stanford University. She is also a faculty member at the Bread Loaf School of English. Lunsford has served as Chair of the Conference on College Composition and Communication (CCCC), as Chair of the Modern Language Association (MLA) Division on Writing, and as a member of the MLA Executive Council.

== Biography ==
Born in Oklahoma, Lunsford grew up in a segregated Appalachian community that shaped her understanding of literacy's liberatory potential. Her family moved frequently due to her father's accounting career, eventually settling in St. Augustine, Florida. Despite being discouraged from pursuing doctoral studies by a professor who suggested she "go home, get married, and have babies," Lunsford received her B.A. and M.A. at the University of Florida and completed her Ph.D. in English at the Ohio State University in 1977.

== Career ==
Lunsford's academic career began in 1965 as an English instructor at Colonial High School in Orlando, Florida, where she taught until 1968. She then served as Associate Professor of English at Hillsborough Community College in Tampa from 1969 to 1972. While completing her doctoral studies at Ohio State University, she worked as a Graduate Research Associate in the English Department from 1972 to 1977. Following her PhD, Lunsford joined the University of British Columbia as an Assistant Professor in 1977, advancing to Associate Professor and Director of Writing from 1981 to 1986. In 1986, Lunsford returned to The Ohio State University as Professor of English, achieving the rank of Distinguished Professor in 1990. During her tenure at Ohio State (1986 to 2000), she held several administrative roles including Vice Chair of the English Department, Chair of the University Writing Board, and Director of the Center for the Study and Teaching of Writing. Concurrently, she maintained an active teaching schedule at Middlebury College's Bread Loaf Graduate School of English, serving intermittently as Professor during summer sessions from 1989 to 2020 and as site director at the Santa Fe Campus from 2001 to 2003.

Lunsford joined Stanford University in 2000 as Professor of English and Director of the Program in Writing and Rhetoric. At Stanford, she founded and directed the Hume Center for Writing and Speaking, held the Claude and Louise Rosenberg Fellowship in Undergraduate Education, and was named Louise Hewlett Nixon Professor from 2006 until her retirement in 2014, when she became Professor Emerita. Throughout her career, she continued her affiliation with and commitment to the Bread Loaf School of English while maintaining an active research agenda and publication record.

She was Chair of the Conference on College Composition and Communication and Chair of the MLA Division on Writing. She served on the Executive Councils of both the Modern Language Association and the National Council of Teachers of English. From 2002 to 2003, she co-chaired the Alliance of Rhetoric Societies International Conference. Ohio State University awarded the Andrea Lunsford Professorship in Writing, Rhetoric, and Literacy in recognition of her contributions to the field. Stanford presents the Lunsford Oral Presentation of Research Award to several second-year undergraduates each year.

She named a Fellow of the Rhetoric Society of America in 2019, Lunsford received the MLA Shaughnessy Award for the best book on the teaching of language (1985), the MLA/ADE Francis Andrew March Award (2002), the Ohio Women of Achievement Award 1996), the Conference on CCCC Exemplar Award (1994), and the CCCC Braddock Award for best article published in College Composition and Communication (1984 and 2005). She. holds honorary doctorate degrees from Middlebury College and Sweden’s University of Örebro.

== Contributions ==
Lunsford, along with Lisa Ede, argues for collaborative writing and the ability for writers to work together and be rewarded for their work on the same level as singular writers. Lunsford has collaborated on researching the role of audience in composition theory and pedagogy. Lunsford and Ede also examined the concept of audience, identifying and describing “addressed” and “invoked” audiences and arguing for an elaborated view of audience that recognizes and values the creativity of both the writer and the reader. In 2001, Lunsford began a five-year longitudinal study of college student writing, following 15% of Stanford’s class of 2005 through college and one year beyond. This study collected writing the student participants did both in and out of class in a digital database. Now housed in the Stanford Digital Archives, this represents one of the largest collections of undergraduate writing.

Her study challenged prevailing assumptions about digital media's impact on student writing, presenting evidence that current students produce more writing across more genres than previous generations. Her work encompasses several areas of rhetorical studies: feminist rhetorical history, theory, and practice, theories of collaborative writing, multimodal composition, intellectual property considerations, and translingual approaches to style. She developed interdisciplinary methods in rhetoric that combine elements from communication studies and composition theory. The concept that "everything's an argument," which she advanced, has been widely adopted in writing pedagogy.

Lunsford has published extensively, with more than twenty books and over one hundred articles and book chapters to her credit. Her textbooks, used in many writing courses, include The Everyday Writer (multiple editions), Everything's an Argument (with John Ruszkiewicz), EasyWriter, Let's Talk: A Pocket Rhetoric, and Everyone's an Author (with Beverly Moss and others). Among her scholarly publications are Reclaiming Rhetorica: Women in the Rhetorical Tradition (as editor), Singular Texts/Plural Authors: Perspectives on Collaborative Writing and Writing Together: Collaboration in Theory and Practice (both with Lisa Ede), The Norton Anthology of Rhetoric and Writing (co-edited with Susan Jarratt), and The Sage Handbook of Rhetorical Studies (as co-editor).

== Personal life ==
She now lives on an ocean bluff in northern California, writing and reading and working in a shared organic garden.

== Selected publications ==
=== Books ===
- Lunsford, Andrea (2007). Writing Matters: Rhetoric in Public and Private Lives. University of Georgia Press. doi:10.1353/book11974. ISBN 978-0-8203-4281-8.
- Lunsford, Andrea A.; Ouzgane, Lahoucine, eds. (2004-05-09). Crossing Borderlands. University of Pittsburgh Press. doi:10.2307/j.ctt5vkh0w. ISBN 978-0-8229-7253-2.
- Connors, Robert J.; Ede, Lisa; Lunsford, Andrea, eds. (1984). Essays on classical rhetoric and modern discourse. Carbondale, Ill.: Southern Illinois Univ. Press. ISBN 978-0-8093-1134-7.
- Lunsford, Andrea (2020). The St. Martin's Handbook (5th ed.). Bedford/St. Martin's. p. 784. ISBN 9781319107536.
- Lunsford, Andrea (2006). Everything's an Argument With Readings (4th ed.). Bedford/St. Martin's. p. 1115. ISBN 978-0312447502.
- Lunsford, Andrea (2022). The Everyday Writer (8th ed.). Bedford/St. Martin's. p. 592. ISBN 978-1319332037.
- Lunsford, Andrea (2 November 2021). EasyWriter. Bedford/St. Martin's. p. 432. ISBN 978-1319244224.
- Lunsford, Andrea A., ed. (1995-04-15). Reclaiming Rhetorica. University of Pittsburgh Press. doi:10.2307/j.ctt5hjt73. ISBN 978-0-8229-7165-8.
- Lunsford, Andrea; Ruszkiewicz, John J. (January 2, 2008). The Presence of Others: Voices and Images That Call for Response (5th ed.). Bedford/St. Martin's. ISBN 978-0312473587.
- Lunsford, Andrea A.; Ede, Lisa S. (1990). Singular texts/plural authors: perspectives on collaborative writing. Carbondale: Southern Illinois University Press. ISBN 978-0-8093-1447-8.
- Swaffar, Janet; Lunsford, Andrea A.; Moglen, Helene; Slevin, James (1991). "The Right to Literacy". The Modern Language Journal. 75 (4): 534. doi:10.2307/329542. ISSN 0026-7902. JSTOR 329542.
- Lunsford, Andrea A.; Moglen, Helene; Slevin, James F.; Modern Language Association of America, eds. (1989). The Future of doctoral studies in English. New York: Modern Language Association of America. ISBN 978-0-87352-185-7.
- Lunsford, Andrea A; Jones, Richard Lloyd-, eds. (1989). The English Coalition Conference: Democracy through Language. Modern Language Association of America. p. 87. ISBN 978-0814113813.
- Altick, Richard D.; Lunsford, Andrea A. (1984). Preface to critical reading (6th ed.). New York: Holt, Rinehart, and Winston. ISBN 978-0-03-061373-9.
- Lunsford, Andrea (1981). Lauer, Janice M.; Tate, Gary (eds.). Four worlds of writing. New York: Harper & Row. ISBN 978-0-06-388635-3.
- Lunsford, Andrea (2023). Let's Talk... A Pocket Rhetoric (2nd ed.). W. W. Norton & Company. ISBN 978-0-393-44112-3.

=== Chapters in Books ===
- Lunsford, Andrea (2006). "Crimes of Writing and Reading". Teaching Rhetorica: Theory, Pedagogy, Practice. Heinemann. ISBN 978-0-86709-589-0.
- Lunsford, Andrea A. (2011-12-31), "Embracing Borderlands: Gloria Anzaldúa and Writing Studies", Bridging, University of Texas Press, pp. 182–188, doi:10.7560/725553-026, ISBN 978-0-292-73471-5
- Lunsford, Andrea (2006). "Writing Definitions". In Yancey, Kathleen B (ed.). Delivering College Composition (5th ed.). heinemann. ISBN 978-0-86709-590-6.
- Lunsford, Andrea (2006). "Composing Ourselves: Politics, Commitment, and the Teaching of Writing". Views from the Center: the CCCC Chairs' Addresses 1977-2005. Bedford/St. Martins. ISBN 978-0312438135.
- Glenn, Cheryl; Lunsford, Andrea A. (2014-03-03), "Rhetoric and Feminism", The Oxford Handbook of Rhetorical Studies, Oxford University Press, pp. 582–598, doi:10.1093/oxfordhb/9780199731596.013.055, ISBN 978-0-19-973159-6
- Lunsford, Andrea. "Janet Emig's 'Writing as a Mode of Learning". In Lunsford, Andrea (ed.). Teaching Writing. Carbondale.
- Rosenblatt, Adam; Lunsford, Andrea (2011-01-01). "Down a Road and into an Awful Silence: Graphic Listening in Joe Sacco's Comics Journalism". Faculty Publications: 130–146.
- Lunsford, Andrea (2020). "RSA at 50: (Re)inventing Stories."". In Mountford, Roxanne; Tell, David (eds.). Reinventing Rhetorical Scholarship:Fifty Years of the Rhetoric Society of America. Parlor press.

=== Journals ===
- Lunsford, Andrea A. (2006). "Writing, technologies, and the fifth canon". Computers and Composition. 23 (2): 169–177. doi:10.1016/j.compcom.2006.02.002. ISSN 8755-4615.
- Leff, Michael; Lunsford, Andrea A. (2004). "Afterwords: A dialogue". Rhetoric Society Quarterly. 34 (3): 55–67. doi:10.1080/02773940409391290. ISSN 0277-3945.
- Fishman, Jenn; Lunsford, Andrea A.; McGregor, Beth; Otuteye, Mark (2005-12-01). "Performing Writing, Performing Literacy". College Composition and Communication. 57 (2): 224–252. doi:10.58680/ccc20054028. ISSN 0010-096X.
- Lunsford, Andrea (2001). "Collaboration and Concepts of Authorship". PMLA. 116 (2): 354–369. doi:10.1632/pmla.2001.116.2.354. ISSN 0030-8129. JSTOR 463522.
- Lunsford, Andrea (2000). "Some Millennial Thoughts about the Future of Writing Centers". Writing Center Journal. 20 (2). doi:10.7771/2832-9414.1466.
- Lunsford, Andrea Abernethy (1999). "Rhetoric, Feminism, and the Politics of Textual Ownership". College English. 61 (5): 529–544. doi:10.2307/378972. ISSN 0010-0994. JSTOR 378972.
- Lunsford, Andrea A.; West, Susan (1996). "Intellectual Property and Composition Studies". College Composition and Communication. 47 (3): 383. doi:10.2307/358295. ISSN 0010-096X. JSTOR 358295.
- Lunsford, Andrea A.; Ede, Lisa (1996). "Representing Audience: "Successful" Discourse and Disciplinary Critique". College Composition and Communication. 47 (2): 167. doi:10.2307/358791. ISSN 0010-096X. JSTOR 358791.
- Lunsford, Andrea A.; West, Susan (1996-10-01). "Intellectual Property and Composition Studies". College Composition and Communication. 47 (3): 383–411. doi:10.58680/ccc19968692. ISSN 0010-096X.
- Lunsford, Andrea (1991-01-01). "Collaboration, Control, and the Idea of a Writing Center". Writing Center Journal. 12 (1). doi:10.7771/2832-9414.1252. ISSN 2832-9414.
- Editor, Special Issue on Postcolonial Studies and Composition. JAC: A Journal of Composition Theory, 18:1 (Winter 1998).
- Lunsford, Andrea Abernethy (2000). "Crimes of Writing: Refiguring "Proper" Discursive Practices". Writing on the Edge. 11 (2): 43–54. ISSN 1064-6051. JSTOR 43158851.
- Lunsford, Andrea A.; Lunsford, Karen J. (2008-06-01). ""Mistakes Are a Fact of Life": A National Comparative Study". College Composition and Communication. 59 (4): 781–806. doi:10.58680/ccc20086677. ISSN 0010-096X.
