= Gregory Ulmer =

Philosopher and media scholar

- Born: December 23, 1944 (age 81)
- Scientific career
- Fields: English, Media Studies
- Workplaces: University of Florida

Gregory Leland Ulmer (born December 23, 1944, US) is professor emeritus in the Department of English at the University of Florida (Gainesville) and a professor of Electronic Languages and Cybermedia at the European Graduate School in Saas-Fee, Switzerland.

== Early life and education ==
Ulmer grew up in Eastern Montana. His father Walt owned a small sand, gravel, and concrete business and also served as representative to the state legislature for ten years, and county commissioner for another six. Ulmer describes his father's attitude to the arts and teaching as disparaging, something he aimed to overcome along with protestant republican sensibilities in his background. He mentions North Dakota winters as a formative memory. His grandmother immigrated to the US from Germany.

He received his bachelors in History and English, from the University of Montana in 1967, with two years spent at the Institute of European Studies, Madrid, Spain, 1965-66.

He received his PhD in comparative literature from Brown University.

== Career ==
From 1972 to 1977 Ulmer worked as an assistant professor in the Humanities Department of the University of Florida and became the Acting Chair of the department in 1979. He received tenure in 1977, and he became the co-director of the Institute for European & Comparative Studies (1987–1990), and the director of the film studies program (1986–1989).

Many of Ulmer's theories grow out of his home-spun "puncepts" like textshop, choragraphy, applied grammatology, mystory, heuretics, and post(e)-pedagogy. His explorations into what he refers to as an "anticipatory consciousness," designed to utilize the force of intuition as a way to invent emergent forms of knowledge, are methodologically remixed by Ulmerian disciples all over the world.

One such project to grow out of Ulmer's magical mystery tour is Illogic of Sense: The Gregory L. Ulmer Remix, an e-book publication that highlights how Ulmer's seminal work has been central to contemporary thinking on the future of writing and new forms of hybridized "digital rhetoric." Published by the Alt-X Press, which was founded by Ulmer's former student turned artist and writer Mark Amerika, the ebook is said to have finally fulfilled the long-promised potential of online publishing to use stimulating visual arrangement, media hybridization, and typographical ingenuity to blur the distinction between publication, exhibition, and design performance, which further brings to mind Ulmer's own self-consciously titled book "Internet Invention."

== Academic interests ==
Ulmer's work focuses on hypertext, electracy and cyberlanguage and is frequently associated with "emerAgency," "choragraphy," "mystoriography," heuretics, and concept avatar. Following his motto (from the Japanese poet Matsuo Bashō) "not to follow in the footsteps of the masters, but to seek what they sought," Ulmer developed a mode for research and pedagogy that does for electracy what the argumentative essay (paper) does for literacy.

He is the author of several books: Illogic of Sense: The Gregory Ulmer Remix; Applied Grammatology: Post(e)-Pedagogy from Jacques Derrida to Joseph Beuys; Teletheory: Grammatology in the Age of Video; Heuretics: The Logic of Invention; Internet Invention: From Literacy to Electracy; and Electronic Monuments. . He has also published numerous articles and maintains a personal website and blog, Heuretics.

== See also ==
- List of thinkers influenced by deconstruction
- Electracy
