= Electracy =

Media theory by Gregory Ulmer

Electracy is a concept proposed by American literary theorist Gregory Ulmer to describe the skills associated with the use of electronic media. This includes topics such as multimedia, hypermedia, social software, and virtual worlds.

== Concept ==
According to Ulmer, electracy is to "digital media what literacy is to print". The concept encompasses the broader cultural, institutional, pedagogical, and ideological implications inherent in the major societal transition from print to electronic media. Electracy is a portmanteau of "electricity" and Jacques Derrida's term "trace".

Electracy encompasses a wide range of research areas, including the history and invention of writing and mnemonic practices, as well as the epistemological and ontological changes resulting from such practices. It also addresses the sociological and psychological implications of networked culture, as well as the pedagogical application of practices derived from these explorations.

Ulmer's work considers other historical moments of radical technological change, such as the invention of the alphabet, writing, and the printing press. Electracy is also grammatological in deriving a methodology from the history of writing and mnemonic practices.

Ulmer introduced electracy in Teletheory (1989). First citations of the work appear in 1997. James Inman described electracy as a contemporary term for what Walter J. Ong called 'secondary orality,' suggesting it may supplant print literacy. Inman distinguishes electracy from other literacies (such as metamedia), stating that it is a broader concept unique for being ontologically dependent exclusively on electronic media.

== Pedagogy ==
Lisa Gye argues that the transition from literacy to electracy has changed "how we think, write, and exchange ideas." She also echoes Ulmer's primary concern, which is to understand how that has transformed learning.

Electracy as an educational aim has been recognized by scholars in several fields, including English composition and rhetoric, literary and media criticism, digital media and art, and architecture. In Mikesch Muecke's words, Ulmer's understanding of electracy has offered a new pedagogical model where "learning is closer to invention than verification." In a review of Internet Invention, Alan Clinton wrote that "Ulmer's pedagogy ultimately levels the playing field between student and teacher."

Ulmer's educational methods fit into a constructivist pedagogical theory and practice, which he discussed at length in an interview with Sung-Do Kim published in 2005.

== See also ==
- Computer literacy
- Information literacy
- Transliteracy
