= Writing about Writing =

Method of teaching composition

Writing about Writing (WAW) is a method or theory of teaching composition that emphasizes writing studies research. Writing about Writing approaches to first-year composition take a variety of forms, typically based on the rationale that students benefit when engaging the "declarative and procedural knowledge" associated with writing studies research.

== History ==
Composition is not widely recognized as its own discipline. Composition instructors strive to teach students how to become better writers. As public perception often shapes public policy, this uninformed view of composition as a legitimate field of study has contributed to a lack of funding and emphasis on composition classes in academia.

=== "Teaching about Writing, Righting Misconceptions" ===
In 2007, Douglas Downs and Elizabeth Wardle published an article titled "Teaching about Writing, Righting Misconceptions" in which they propose a reform of first-year composition instruction based on the results of a test course they developed. This course sought "to improve students' understanding of writing, rhetoric, language, and literacy" and promoted a view of reading and writing as scholarly inquiry, encouraging "more realistic conceptions of writing." The article is considered to be revolutionary by other scholars in the field, and it is frequently cited by those who have continued the work in developing WAW approaches.

In the article, Downs and Wardle deny the existence of a universal educated discourse, which conflicts with first-year composition goals of preparing students to write across the curriculum. Downs and Wardle write that teaching students how to write across the curriculum supports the idea that "writing is not a real subject, that writing courses do not require expert instructors, and that rhetoric and composition are not genuine research areas or legitimate intellectual pursuits."

The article goes on to outline the course they designed that is centered more on teaching the students about "writing studies", rather than how to write in college. The authors discuss readers, research assignments, reflective assignments and presentation assignments before going on to report case-studies of two students who took Downs' and Wardle's WAW-centered first-year composition course. While these were different types of students who had different learning outcomes, both stories illustrate the flexible nature of WAW and how this type of course can be tailored towards individual student needs. The authors discuss several benefits they observed of using WAW to teach first-year composition but also indicate the presence of challenges associated with teaching this kind of course, and address both these challenges as well as critiques they received from colleagues.

The authors conclude that an implementation of WAW-centered classes in first-year composition professionalizes writing instruction and raises awareness about writing studies as a legitimate discipline. Downs and Wardle write "rather than purporting to teach students 'academic writing' and claiming to prepare them for writing in their disciplines, the course teaches students what we as a field have learned about writing as an object of study." Essentially, the aim of a WAW course is for students to discover how writing is governed by its audience, purpose and context.

=== "Continuing the Dialogue" ===
After its publication, the article caused a stir in academia and received a lot of response from the community, prompting a follow-up article by Wardle in 2008 titled "Continuing the Dialogue: Follow-up Comments on 'Teaching about Writing, Righting Misconceptions.'" In it, Wardle addresses responders who commented that she and Downs put too much emphasis on first-year composition within the field by explaining that first-year composition should not hold more value than other branches within their field, but it is of importance and merits scholarly inquiry. She reaffirms their main point as being "that we should reconceive the nature of FYC goals and focus on the content knowledge we have as a field from which students can benefit." She goes on to write, "Let me be as clear as possible: Doug and I are arguing that composition instructors should refuse to separate knowledge about writing from practice in writing and some instruction on how to complete the writing tasks at hand." Another misconception she addresses is misconstruing a first-year writing WAW approach as being the same as an introductory course to a writing major and dismisses the claims that a WAW approach is put in place to recruit writing majors. The differences between these two courses, she explains, are both audience and purpose. Downs and Wardle expanded have produced an accompanying textbook, Writing about Writing: A College Reader, which was published in 2011.

== Benefits ==
In "Teaching About Writing, Righting Misconceptions," Downs and Wardle discuss several benefits they found WAW affords students including:

- an increased self-awareness about writing
- improved reading abilities
- improved confidence as a student
- raised awareness of research writing as conversation

WAW asks students to read about writing and various processes, which allows them to identify what works for them. By reading articles that a composition studies student might read, the first-year composition student is able to gain further insight into the ongoing conversation centered around writing. In her article "Writing about Writing in Basic Writing," Shannon Carter explains "a writing-about-writing approach foregrounds research in writing and related studies by asking students to read and discuss key research in the discipline and contribute to the scholarly conversation themselves." She explains that having students immerse themselves in this type of scholarship will not only improve their writing but their understanding of writing as an academic discipline will increase as well, which in turn contributes to changing the public perception that writing is only something that is a piece of other disciplines.

Many instructors who use WAW are also benefited in that they themselves are able to learn more about composition studies along with their class, promoting parallel learning. In an article titled "Seeing is Believing: Writing Studies with 'Basic Writing' Students," Charlton reports that some see value in teaching first-year composition from a cultural studies approach because not only does this allow for composition instructors to teach what they love, but the types of reading promote critical thinking and analysis—two goals many first-year composition courses have. Also, the article reports on several instructors incorporating graduate level writing-studies readings into their first-year writing courses with much success. Charlton writes, "Students were engaged and were developing research questions and projects that rivaled my on senior-level composition theory class, both in terms of complexity and overall quality of finished products."

== Criticism and responses ==
As WAW is a relatively recent movement and is still in its early stages of development, proponents do not always agree on how WAW should be applied to the classroom. Carter points out instructors only account for a small portion of the composition community, and therefore disagreement is common and "often in fundamental ways."

In his response to Downs and Wardle's "Teaching About Writing, Righting Misconceptions," Joshua P. Kutney argues that providing students with an awareness of writing through WAW will not necessarily transfer to their writing performance. He compares WAW to students who take courses that raise their awareness of social problems. While students gain a greater sense of these issues through these courses, rarely do they display behavioral changes in regard to these issues.

Kutney also argues that an increased awareness of writing studies may result in students becoming more comfortable with validating their insufficiencies as a writer because they now recognize the difficulties expert writers have, and not because they now comprehend "the nuances of the composing process." He goes on to say that while Downs and Wardle discuss WAW as allowing students to see academic writing as engaging in an ongoing conversation, this knowledge might overwhelm the student and cause them to avoid engaging in the conversation altogether. Kutney writes, "While First-Year Composition may not do much to develop the writing abilities of students, Downs and Wardle offer no reason to think that Introduction to Writing Studies, a course that does not purport to teach writing, will do more."

In their response to Downs and Wardle, Miles et al. claim a WAW approach seems like it serves as an introduction to a writing major, which would not be beneficial to first-year students. They take issue with Downs and Wardle's "dismissal of the importance of teaching situated procedural knowledge", most notably the rhetorical situation. Miles et al. claim the only rhetorical situation a WAW course exposes its students to is that of scholarly research. They also argue that Downs and Wardle put too much emphasis on first-year composition within the field of writing studies, seeing it as the predominant branch of the field. They also argue that Downs and Wardle fail to give voice to the students in their case study who did not benefit from the WAW approach and that only those who did are highlighted. Another main criticism they have is WAW's reliance on one modality of research writing while they argue that their "research and scholarship is an interesting hybrid of several modalities at once."

Downs published a response to Miles et al. in which he expresses displeasure at the arguments the authors laid out:

My first reaction to Miles et al.'s response to "FYC as Intro to Writing Studies" is about as magnanimous as their response itself – that is, not remotely. This disappoints me, because I do maintain the ideal of scholarship wherein a constructive dialectic stretch, shapes, and builds ideas rather than merely tearing them down. I confess my first instinct is to tear down Miles et al.'s response as they attempt to tear down the construct we forwarded. (Earning the condemnation of an entire department is bracing-and ironic when the scholarship of some of the signatories – for me, Schwegler and Shamoon – planted seeds of ideas they find unworkable.

He writes Miles et al. "seem to address us as if we are sitting at the kids' table at Thanksgiving dinner." His main contentions are:

- Miles et al. seem only to respond to arguments Downs and Wardle didn't make rather than focusing on the ones they did.
- There is a major difference between the type of course he and Wardle advocate from first-year writing and a course that serves as in introduction to a writing major.
- Miles et al. grossly misinterpreted the types of readings that are purposed to be involved in WAW, as they are not all of an academic nature and nowhere in Downs' and Wardle's article do they say that it is.
- In regard to the criticism that first-year writing students will have a difficult time comprehending readings that are also taught to graduate students, Downs states that it is an "admirable goal" of writing programs to support this kind of learning, and cutting first-year students off from this type of learning is "unnecessarily limiting."

He concludes by writing "I am grateful not only for the opportunity to respond, but to have something to respond to. And I wonder how differently our students might understand writing if they had similar opportunities."

A response to Downs' response to Miles et al. by Slomp and Sargent does not reject Downs and Wardle's ideas in the same way Miles et al. does but calls for more research on the WAW method. The authors also argue that Downs and Wardle fail to position themselves into an ongoing conversation in the same way they advocate for in WAW. Slomp and Sargent say that Downs and Wardle paint themselves to be "lone pioneers" in this venture, but in the 1990s Wendy Bishop supported the use of writing as the main subject in the writing classroom. They also reference Peter Elbow as being someone who touched on similar ideas to WAW long before Downs and Wardle published "Teaching about Writing, Righting Misconceptions."

Shannon Carter, while a proponent of WAW, describes how it is not always accessible to other instructors or policy makers. She describes how WAW can be "off-putting" to others, and the scholarship on the subject cannot be relied on in making changes to composition curriculum. She explains that while WAW can be effective for some, it is simply one way to approach teaching composition and will not work with everyone's teaching style.

As previously mentioned, many believe that because the readings are written by professionals for professionals, undergraduates will not be able to easily understand the concepts, which will negatively affect engagement with the course. Some even question Downs and Wardle's motives and see WAW as a ploy in "recruiting" more students to become majors in the field.

== Writing about Writing: A College Reader ==
Published in 2011, Downs and Wardle's book is described as "encouraging students to draw on what they know in order to contribute to ongoing conversations about writing and literacy." In the preface for the instructors, Downs and Wardle describes their frustration with composition courses that are based around themes that have nothing to do with writing. They list several reasons as to why WAW is a "smart choice" in terms of an approach to teaching first-year composition:

- WAW engages students in a relevant subject
- WAW engages students' own area of expertise
- WAW helps students transfer what they learn
- WAW has been extensively class tested—and it works.

The book addresses several questions geared towards helping the student understand multiple components of writing: Why study writing? How do readers read and writers write? How do you write? How have you become the readers and writer you are today? How do communities shape writing? How do you make yourself heard as college writer? A mixture of selected readings from both scholars, authors, and students are provided, as well as various activities and discussion questions associated with the readings.

=== Selected readings ===
Below are some of the readings included in Writing about Writing: A College Reader:

- Stuart Greene, Argument as Conversation: The Role of Inquiry in Writing a Researched Argument
- Joseph M. Williams, The Phenomenology of Error
- Donald M. Murray, All Writing Is Autobiography
- Christina Haas and Linda Flower, Rhetorical Reading Strategies and the Construction of Meaning
- Sondra Perl, The Composing Processes of Unskilled College Writers
- Mike Rose, Rigid Rules, Inflexible Plans, and the Stifling of Language: A Cognitivist Analysis of Writer's Block
- Anne Lamott, Shitty First Drafts
- Stephen King, What Writing Is
- Allegra Goodman, Calming the Inner Critic and Getting to Work
- Kent Haruf, To See Your Story Clearly, Start by Pulling the Wool over Your Own Eyes
- Susan Sontag, Directions: Write, Read, Rewrite. Repeat Steps 2 and 3 as Needed.
- Junot Díaz, Becoming a Writer
- Malcolm X, Learning to Read
- Sherman Alexie, The Joy of Reading and Writing: Superman and Me
- Shirley Brice Heath, Protean Shapes in Literacy Events: Ever-Shifting Oral and
- Dennis Baron, From Pencils to Pixels: The Stages of Literacy Technologies
- John Swales, The Concept of Discourse Community
- James Paul Gee, Literacy, Discourse, and Linguistics: Introduction

=== Reception ===
The book is praised for its accessibility and forward thinking. For instance, David R. Russell from Iowa State University called the book "a milestone in composition textbooks." Russell is known for his work in Writing Across the Curriculum and activity theory.

Its publisher's website describes it by saying "Throughout the book, friendly explanations and scaffolded questions help students connect to readings and — even more important — develop knowledge about writing they can use at work, in their everyday lives, and in college."

== What do people think of this today? (As of 2026) ==
As this article was published in 2007, a lot has changed as of then, especially with what writing went through during COVID-19, as we had to transition to online learning. Reynaldo Collado Jr. PhD, a Senior Education Program Specialist, explained how difficult it was during the shutdown to have students collaborate with each other and in group works in affect to research. With online applications like Zoom, GoogleMeet, and many other video-chat websites, students have the option to keep their camera off and microphone off, which made group research projects really hard to complete within the 'breakrooms' that they were put into to work on them, which made students feel nervous to ask questions over the screen. This aligns with the WAW theory but also includes perspectives from teachers/professors that are experiencing how writing is today, after COVID-19.
