= Collaborative pedagogy =

Collaborative pedagogy stems from the process theory of rhetoric and composition. Collaborative pedagogy believes that students will better engage with writing, critical thinking, and revision if they engage with others. Collaborative pedagogy pushes back against the Current-Traditional model of writing, as well as other earlier theories explaining rhetoric and composition; earlier theories of writing, especially current-traditional, emphasizes writing as a final product (completed individually). In contrast, collaborative pedagogy rejects the notion that students think, learn, and write in isolation. Collaborative pedagogy strives to maximize critical thinking, learning, and writing skills through interaction and interpersonal engagement. Collaborative pedagogy also connects to the broader theory of collaborative learning, which encompasses other disciplines including, but not limited to, education, psychology, and sociology.

In the rhetoric and composition discourse community, there exists much support for and debate about the use of collaborative learning in the classroom. Although collaborative pedagogy deals with the strategies associated with promoting engagement, critical thinking, and inclusivity, these theorists underscore collaborative pedagogy's link to cultural studies, argumentation, community literacy, academic discourse, and university standards and policy connected with first-year composition.

Discussions of collaborative pedagogy also emerge in the technical communication field, a subset of rhetoric and composition. Technical communication incorporates collaborative pedagogy by attempting to bridge real work environments with university classrooms through group assignments.

== Theorists in rhetoric and composition ==
There are many rhetoric and composition theorists who explore collaborative pedagogy in their body of work. These theorists include, but are not limited to, Kenneth Bruffee, John Trimbur, Joseph Harris, and Wayne Campbell Peck, Linda Flower, and Lorraine Higgins. Kenneth Bruffee sees collaborative pedagogical strategies as natural to the learning process, more than individual thinking and learning. John Trimbur defines collaboration as admitting both dissent and agreement, and thinks that collaboration should not aim only for agreement. Joseph Harris thinks that the university sometimes adversarial to collaborative pedagogy, since individual product is more highly valued. Peck, Flower, and Higgins champion collaborative pedagogy as pivotal to reconciling various cultural, social, and socioeconomic difference.

== Support and critique ==
=== An aid to a natural state of interaction ===
In "Collaboration and the 'Conversation of Mankind'". Kenneth A. Bruffee cites thinking out loud and collaborating as natural states of learning, because they mimic the process of earlier stages of development. Citing Michael Oakeshott, Bruffee argues that "[w]e first experience and learn 'the skill and partnership of conversation', in the external arena of direct social exchange with other people. Only then do we learn to displace that 'skill and partnership' by playing silently with ourselves, in imagination, the parts of all the participants in the conversation." In other words, he believes that the concepts of independent learning and thinking are more like social constructs than a natural state of being. Despite believing in Oakeshott's theories about collaborative learning being natural, he acknowledges the difficulty of blending this with the independent and authoritative environment of the classroom, especially the college first-year composition classroom. Bruffee confronts the overarching fact that "[h]umanistic study, we have been led to believe, is a solitary life, and the vitality of the humanities lies in the talents and endeavors of each of us as individuals." On a more minute level, collaborative pedagogy becomes problematic for instructors who worry that classrooms will spiral out of control, in "... an adversarial activity pitting individual against individual." However, Bruffee thinks that if composition instructors and scholars believe in writing and learning as a process from which everyone can benefit, then it is important to forge community through collaboration, despite the individualist discourse of the university.

=== Crossing socioeconomic boundaries ===
Wayne Campbell Peck et al. view collaborative pedagogy in a positive light, due to its success at the Community Literacy Center (CLC), which pairs inner-city high school students with student mentors from Carnegie Mellon University. They describe a curriculum encouraging students to write responses to the real world situations they face, such as writing their school administrators about detention policies. Peck et al. justify the need for their program by positing that, "... beyond cultural appreciation, we believe that the next, more difficult step in community-building is to create an intercultural dialogue that allows people to confront and solve problems across racial and economic boundaries." Their program attempts to reach this goal of intercultural dialogue by promoting multiple levels of interaction and understanding. First, the mentors from Carnegie Mellon and the inner-city youth must reach mutual understanding to promote clearer communication. Next, the students and administrators need to remain open to the others’ perspectives to develop stronger community. Last, the program coordinators need to view all parties involved as equal stakeholders. Overall, they argue that their program, while often fraught with conflict, helps stakeholders in different positions understand varying perspectives about issues in their local community, and that this learning process is both necessary and beneficial.

=== Counterintuitive to university culture and community ===
A critique of collaborative pedagogy is that it juxtaposes the individual work production valued within the university. In "The Idea of Community in the Study of Writing", Joseph Harris echoes Bruffee's sentiments that the community and individual work at cross-purposes within the university setting. He claims that although the term "collaborative" usually connotes a positive sense of belonging, community in reality often creates an "us versus them" mentality, and also creating a dichotomy between individual and group, or in this case, student versus university. He wonders, "If to enter the academic community a student must 'learn to speak our language' [in reference to David Bartholomae's "Inventing the University"], and become accustomed and reconciled to our ways of doing things with words, then how exactly is she to do this?" Issues of inclusion, exclusion, community, and individual relate to collaborative pedagogy, because first-year composition instructors struggle to promote critical thinking and collaborative learning, while also meeting the demands of college-level writing. Harris does not provide much consolation to this problem, except to say that students need to learn to navigate the complexities of individual and community identity.

=== As critical engagement ===
John Trimbur both supports and critiques collaborative pedagogy, but his support is predicated upon adjusting the views of both conflict and resolution. His article, "Consensus and Difference in Collaborative Learning," focuses on redefining the definition of consensus" as it applies to collaborative pedagogy in the first-year composition classroom. He argues that:

To develop a critical version of collaborative learning, we will need to distinguish between consensus as an acculturative practice that reproduces business as usual and consensus as an oppositional one that challenges the prevailing conditions of production. The point of collaborative learning is not simply to demystify the authority of knowledge by revealing its social character but to transform the productive apparatus, to change the social character of production. In this regard, it will help to cast consensus not as a "real world" practice but as a utopian one.

— Trimbur (2009), p. 743

After he links collaborative learning with his notion of the role of consensus, he claims that "The revised notion of consensus I am proposing here depends paradoxically on its deferral, not its realization. I am less interested in students achieving consensus…as their using consensus as a critical to open gaps in the conversation through which differences may emerge." This notion of consensus helps students build community and collaboration by grappling with issues that do not lend themselves so easily to consensus as agreement.

== Technical communication theorists ==
There are many technical communication scholars who explore collaborative pedagogy in their body of work. These theorists include, but are not limited to, Aviva Freedman, Christine Adam, Ann M. Blakeslee, and Robert J. Johnson. Aviva Freedman and Christine Adam view the traditional classroom model as detrimental to students/future employees, because the classroom prevents critical thinking, independence, collaboration, and cooperation between coworkers. Ann M. Blakeslee believes that the classroom and the workplace can blend together for new learning, as long as both parties remain open to communication. Robert J. Johnson thinks that writing is inherently collaborative, because technical writers have to acknowledge live audiences to accomplish real and necessary tasks.

=== Technical communication views of collaborative pedagogy ===
The works of the scholars listed above and in the references section primarily deal with the conundrum of preparing students for collaborative work environments, when most of their work occurs individually and in a classroom environment. Freedman and Adam worry that the classroom creates trained in capacities in students, preventing them from adapting to a work world where authoritative boundaries are blurred and most stakeholders are equal. Blakeslee notes that even when instructors try to bring the "real world" into the classroom, businesses and students still struggle to communicate clearly. Robert J. Johnson makes the theoretical claim that audience awareness is central to technical communication as a practice, but that the university purposefully separates writer from audience, which does not promote collaborative pedagogy or learning. However, he further argues that for communication to succeed in any setting, audience must be "involved" rather than removed from the process of communicating.

== See also ==
- Consensus decision-making – Group decision-making aiming for universal agreement
- Consensus theory of truth – Concept in epistemology
- Process theory of composition
