= Sondra Perl =

American academic

- Education: Ph.D, New York University; M.A., New York University; B.A., Simmons College
- Occupations: Professor, researcher, educator
- Years active: 1978–2016
- Employer(s): Lehman College; Graduate Center of the City University of New York; CUNY Hostos Community College

Sondra Perl is a professor emerita of English at Lehman College and director of the Ph.D. in composition and rhetoric at the Graduate Center of the City University of New York. She is the founder and former director of the New York City Writing Project. She writes about the composing process as well as pedagogical approaches to implementing composition theories into writing practices in the classroom.

== Biography ==
=== Early life ===
Born in Newark, New Jersey, Perl was the oldest of four children: two boys and two girls. Her father, a businessman, owned a fire alarm company, and her mother was a homemaker. After growing up in Millburn, New Jersey and graduating from Millburn High School, Perl moved to Boston to attend the all-female Simmons College. She graduated in 1969 with a degree in art history.

=== Graduate work ===
She began graduate studies at New York University in 1971 in a master's in arts and sciences program. With a curiosity for teaching and how individuals learn, she switched to the Master of Education program. She student-taught at Seward Park High School on the Lower East Side, the inspiration for the book by Bel Kaufman, Up the Down Staircase. While earning her master's degree and undergoing teacher licensure, Perl became an adjunct teacher of writing in the fall of 1971 at CUNY Hostos Community College in the South Bronx. Following the completion of her Master of Education degree in 1972, she took up a full-time position at Hostos teaching writing following the influence of Troyka & Nudelman's Steps in Composition.

With a desire to study what she was doing in her classroom, Perl pursued a doctorate in English education part-time at NYU. Perl's Ph.D. program at NYU was influenced by Louise Rosenblatt and the transactional theory of reading, or how readers bring meaning to the text in front of them. Perl's dissertation, inspired by her own teaching experience and the work of composition theorist Janet Emig, consisted of a series of case studies on the writing process. From 1975 to 1978, Perl conducted her study on the writing processes of Hostos’ writers as they composed by asking students to think out loud as they wrote.

=== Professional career ===
In 1978, Perl moved to Lehman College, where she co-founded the New York City Writing Project, of which she also served as co-director, with John Brereton and Richard Sterling. The project explored pedagogy as outlined by what is known today as The National Writing Project. At Lehman, Perl continued to study the writing process. She was involved with the Looking Both Ways Initiative from 1998 to 2006, a platform for high school and college writing teachers to discuss the teaching and assessment of writing. She also spearheaded the CUNY Writing Across the Curriculum program, mandated by the CUNY Board of Trustees in 1999. As Professor Emerita of English at Lehman College and director of the Ph.D. program in Composition and Rhetoric at the Graduate Center of the City University of New York, Perl's research interests include writing, teaching, creative nonfiction, ethnography, women's studies, holocaust studies, cross-cultural dialogue, urban education, collaborative projects, and writing across curriculum. Along with her studies of composition theory & rhetoric, felt sense, embodied knowing, digital composing, new media, creative nonfiction, memoir, Holocaust, and genocide studies, she specializes in autobiography, biography & life-writing; composition theory & rhetoric; digital humanities, textual & media scholarship; and pedagogy. In 2011, she mentored a Ph.D. student project, The Writing Studies Tree, as a faculty advisor. She retired in 2016.

=== Honors and awards ===
Sondra Perl has earned multiple honors and awards for her work as a professor, advocate, educator, and composition theorist. Perl is a Guggenheim Fellow and Carnegie Foundation's Professor of the Year for New York State. She won the 2016 Exemplar Award from the Conference on College Composition and Communication, as well. Her involvement with The Olga Lengyel Institute yielded her roles as founder and director of the Holocaust Educators Network and creator of the New York City Summer Seminar.

== Methods ==
=== Recursive writing process ===
Much of Perl's work in composition theory stems from her skepticism toward the idea of the writing process as a linear procedure. Instead, Perl argues that writing is recursive, or that writers refer back to previous stages of the writing process as they progress to later stages of the process. Writers are constantly rereading their work and assessing its representation of their goals for a particular piece of writing. Perl also argues "felt sense," or the feelings and reactions surrounding the writing manifested when the writer rereads the work, inform the writing process in a way that relies on a holistic sense of the writing already present in order to move forward.

=== Felt sense ===
Felt sense is a sensation used by writers during the writing process that is difficult to measure. It refers to the way the words flow in a piece of writing and the feelings surrounding the reader's reception to that flow. Perl describes felt sense as the physical reactions writers experience to their writing, such as when they pause while reading their work aloud. It may also represent the experience a writer has when they interact with a topic; what comes to mind when the writer encounters a topic embodies this felt sense.

=== Think-aloud protocol ===
Composition theorist Janet Emig inspired Perl's use of the think-aloud protocol in her composition and pedagogical research. In understanding the composing process and how students write, Perl employed a think-aloud protocol by asking students to speak out loud as they composed. This method of research offers a firsthand explanation of particular behaviors being performed by study participants. It continues to be used by researchers today as a way to understand the nuances of the writing process that may not appear on paper. It often points to recursive behavior as writers continue to reference previous steps or text from their composition.

=== Perl process ===
Perl developed her own writing process based on her research of the recursive writing process and its elements of felt sense. Fellow composition theorist Peter Elbow outlines Perl's guidelines as a basic four step process writers can apply to any piece of work:

- Focus on what's in your mind and consider what may cause restraint
- List multiple ideas to write about
- Frequently reference your 'felt sense' to keep your writing on track toward your goals
- Interrogate the meaning, direction, and shortcomings of your writing

== Works ==
=== "The Composing Process of Unskilled College Writers" ===
Inspired by Janet Emig's research of student composition, Perl's dissertation explores how students write and the process they follow to do so. As a teacher, Perl wondered why some students were better writers and whether it had to do with their cognitive development, their attitudes toward writing, or something else. Calling on think-aloud protocol, Perl's study translates recordings of students speaking as they compose into composing schemes. These schemes represent codes of behaviors students exhibited as they wrote, allowing Perl to study how the writing process unfolds over time. Perl discovered that the recursive writing process, or returning to their topic, earlier writing, or felt sense, helps students make meaning in their writing. Students who instead over-engage in surface-level editing find writing to be exhausting because they feel they need to be correct in their writing. Through this study, Perl concluded that writing as a process of discovery was more beneficial to student writing than teaching a reliance on rules. A process of discovery also allowed unskilled writers to make sense of what they write and feel more connected to it.

=== "Understanding Composing" ===
Perl explores the recursive writing process and internally-addressed 'felt sense' contribute to the meaning of piece of writing. Through a process of changing and readjusting writing in a nonlinear fashion, the writing takes on new meaning each time it is approached by the writer. By considering themself both a writer and a reader, the writer challenges the idea of a clean and linear writing process. The patterns of composing involves going backward to go forward and to constantly pay attention to how a piece feels to a reader and a writer, where it has the potential to go, and what can be discovered through the writing.

=== On Austrian Soil: Teaching Those I Was Taught to Hate ===
In this teaching memoir, Perl recounts her struggles with teaching Austrian students. She describes her pedagogical approaches to addressing Nazism's role in the past, present, and future, particularly with students whose ancestral pasts are so intimately connected to its prejudices. Through writing and dialogue, Perl learns the importance of confronting, teaching, and discussing history in combatting hatred. As a Jewish woman faced with teaching descendants of Nazis, Perl reflects on how education can overcome hate bred from any perspective.

== Selected bibliography ==
- "The Composing Processes of Unskilled College Writers". Research in the Teaching of English. 13 (4): 317–336.
- "Understanding Composing". College Composition and Communication. 31 (4): 363. doi:10.2307/356586
- Writing True: The Art and Craft of Creative Nonfiction. co-authored with Mimi Schwartz; 2nd Edition. Boston, MA: Cengage, 2014.
- On Austrian Soil: Breaking the Cycle of Hate, A Teaching Memoir. Albany, NY: SUNY Press, 2005.
- Felt Sense: Writing with the Body. Portsmouth, NH: Boynton/Cook, 2004.
- "From Confusion to Compassion: The Transformative Power of Response Journals." In Teaching the Holocaust. Ed. Marianne Hirsch and Irene Kacandes. New York: MLA, 2004.
- "Dear Peter: A Collage in Several Voices." In Writing with Elbow. Eds. Pat Belanoff, Marcia Dickson, Sheryl Fontaine and Charles Moran. Logan, UT: Utah State UP, 2002, 253–267.
- "Early Work on Composing: Lessons and Illuminations." In Perspectives on Writing: Theory, Research, Practice. Eds. Beth Boehm, Debra Journet and Mary Rosner. Stamford, CT: Ablex, 83–98.
- Composing a Pleasurable Life in Women/Writing/Teaching. Ed. Jan Schmidt. Albany, NY: SUNY Press, 1998, 239–253.
- Through Teachers' Eyes: Portraits of Writing Teachers at Work. Portsmouth, NH: Heinemann, 1986/1998 (with Nancy Wilson).
- "Facing the Other: The Emergence of Ethics and Selfhood in a Cross-Cultural Writing Classroom." In Narration as Knowledge: Tales of the Teaching Life. Ed. Joseph Trimmer. Portsmouth, NH: Boynton/Cook, 1997, 173–190.
- Landmark Essays on Writing Process. Edited volume. Mahwah, NJ: Erlbaum Press, 1994.
- "Book Review of An Open Language: Selected Writing on Literacy, Learning, and Opportunity," January 2007, https://archive.nwp.org/cs/public/print/resource/2369
- "Reflections on the Writing Process," (with Elaine Avidon), The Quarterly, Vol. 3, No. 3, June 1981, https://archive.nwp.org/cs/public/print/resource/1858
