= First-year composition =

Introductory core curriculum writing course in US colleges and universities

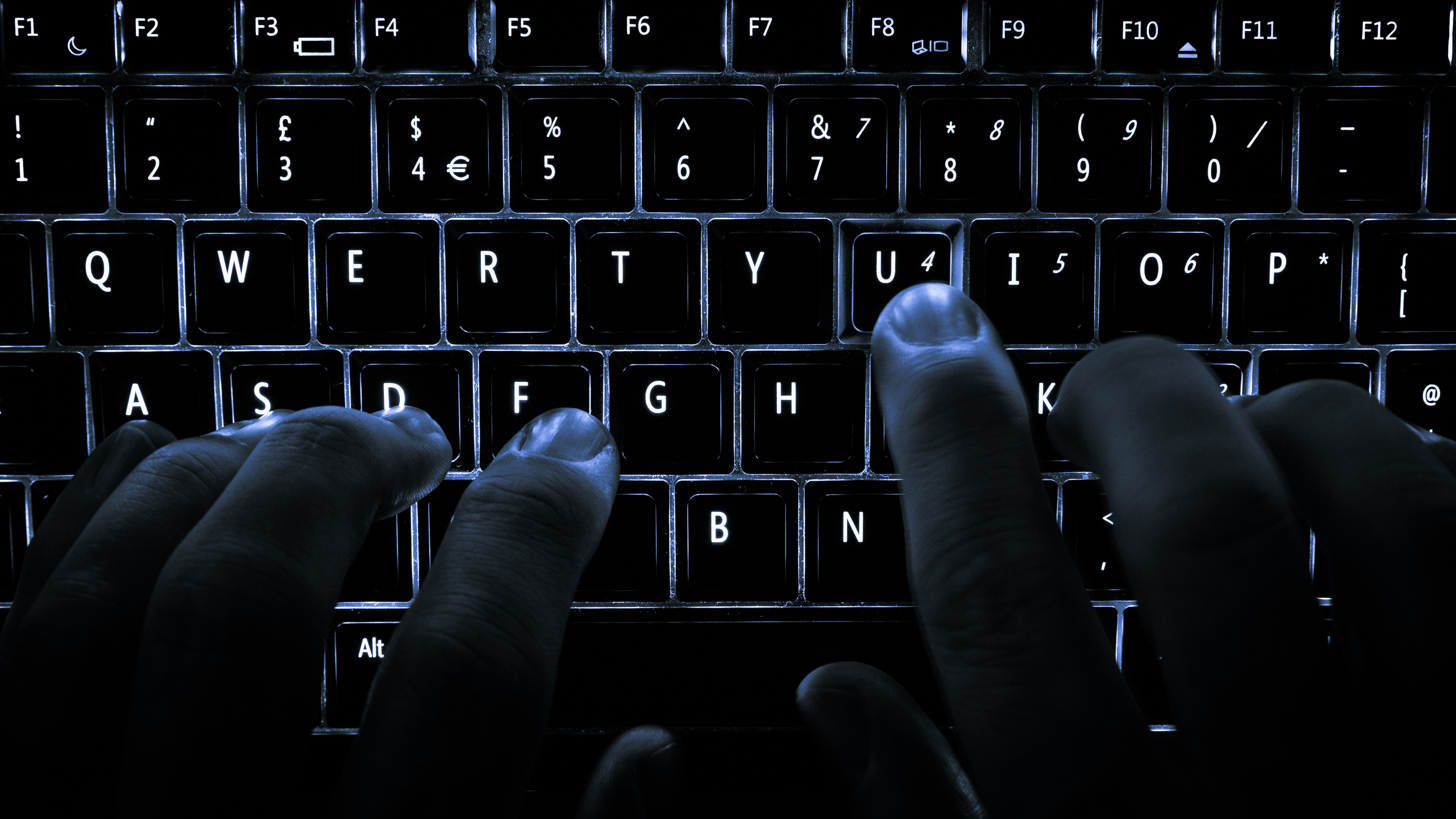
With the development of digital technologies, student writing has evolved in first-year composition courses to take on many forms beyond words on paper and include digital genres.

First-year composition (sometimes known as first-year writing, freshman composition or freshman writing) is an introductory core curriculum writing course in US colleges and universities. This course focuses on improving students' abilities to write in a university setting and introduces students to writing practices in the disciplines and professions. These courses are traditionally required of incoming students, thus the previous name, "Freshman Composition." Scholars working within the field of composition studies often have teaching first-year composition (FYC) courses as the practical focus of their scholarly work.

FYC courses are structured in a variety of ways. Some institutions of higher education require only one term of FYC, while others require two or three courses. There are a number of identifiable pedagogies associated with FYC, including: current-traditional, expressivist, social-epistemic, process, post-process and Writing about Writing (WAW). Each of these pedagogies can generate a multitude of curricula.

Composition professionals, including those with degrees in Writing Studies and Rhetoric and Composition, often focus on a rhetorical approach to help students learn how to apply an understanding of audience, purpose, context, invention, and style to their writing processes. This rhetorical approach has shown that real writing, rather than existing as isolated modes, has more to do with a writer choosing from among many approaches to perform rhetorical tasks. In addition to a focus on rhetoric, many first year composition courses also emphasize the writing process, and students are encouraged to interact with classmates and receive feedback to be used for revision. These practices can take the form of essay peer review or workshopping. Portfolios are a common way of assessing revised student work.

== Goals of First-Year Composition ==
First-year Composition courses are college writing classes that are designed to help students to be able to develop academic writing, critical thinking, and rhetorical skills. These courses are typically mandatory at colleges/universities across the United States and focus on teaching students how to write for different audiences, purposes, and academic contexts.

Overtime, Studies show that scholars often disagree about the effectiveness of these courses and whether they achieve intended learning outcomes. Some emphasize rhetorical awareness and critical thinking, while others questions whether the skills learned are useful in later academic or professional setting. Research in composition studies also examines how these courses help address student misconceptions and support the development of academic writing practices.

== History ==
Since the late nineteenth century, college courses on composition have become increasingly common in American higher education. The German model of "rigorous 'scientific' philology and historical criticism" influenced instruction that caused the research paper to become a staple in first-year composition. Although a longstanding course offering at many colleges, first-year composition remains controversial and marginalized.

=== First-year requirement debate ===
The requirement for a first-year composition course has been debated in composition studies. This debate centers around how effective the first-year composition course is and the changes that need to be made to develop the field of composition. While most schools do require some form of the first-year composition course, there are some schools that have decided to abolish the first-year composition requirement; on the other hand, some have suggested that the first-year composition course be replaced with a course that emphasizes writing within one's own discipline.

Some scholars, such as Sharon Crowley in Composition in the University: Historical and Polemical Essays, argue that this requirement should be abolished. Crowley does not suggest the course itself be removed, only the requirement that all freshmen take the course. She states that students would still be interested in the course if the requirement was abolished and that removing the requirement would strengthen the field of composition. She implies that composition studies are marginalized within the university because of the view of the first-year composition course as a skill course. Removing the requirement, she states, would remove the association of composition studies with introductory courses, giving more acknowledgement to the field. Crowley's opinion initiated a debate in the composition field, but she is not the only critic who advocates for the removal of this requirement. Scholars Douglas Downs and Elizabeth Wardle also dislike the requirement and instead argue for a writing studies curriculum.

Other scholars such as David Smit disagree, arguing that the first-year composition requirement remain and that the course's curriculum and structure be altered for improvement. Smit explains that many of the developmental goals of those who favor abolishing the requirement can still be achieved by offering more writing experiences. He proposes more genre writing in composition courses with a "scaffolding" progression of discipline writing. If this was done, he suggests, the concerns over the status of composition studies in the university would still be solved, as the course would no longer be seen as skills based.

Some universities, such as Rowan University in a 2023 entry on the university's website, do believe that continuing to teach and utilize the first-year composition program holds several valuable benefits for students to learn such as the social aspects that come with both reading and writing and the discussions between students that arise from it, the overall importance critical analysis of text holds, how to use outside factors like audience and purpose to better understand their writing, learning how to create informed writing that includes all societal groups, not just one, and it helps students understand the ethical requirements that comes when researching and writing new information.

There has been no consensus reached in composition studies regarding the status of the first-year composition course requirement. The benefits of the course, as well as the drawbacks, continue to be debated and the scholars noted above are only a few of the voices and perspectives involved in this discussion. Despite the debate about the requirement, it remains in effect at a majority of US colleges universities.

== Structure of contemporary first-year composition ==
First-year composition is designed to meet the goals for successful completion set forth by the Council of Writing Program Administrators. To reach these goals, students must learn rhetorical conventions, critical thinking skills, information literacy, and the process of writing an academic paper. There is no standard curriculum for first-year composition established at the national level. Curriculum is developed at other levels by individual states, institutions, departments, and writing programs.

== Writing Process and Pedagogy ==
Studies have shown how first-year composition is taught through different pedagogical approaches. Donald Murray argued that writing instruction should focus on process rather than project, encouraging students to revise and develop ideas during drafting. Peter Elbow emphasizes free writing and drafting as a way to reduce anxiety and encourage idea generation.

James Berlin discusses how composition instruction is shaped by underlying beliefs about language and education. Richard Fulkerson also identifies multiple approaches to teaching writing, including expressive and critical approaches.

=== First-year composition and rhetoric ===
With the publication of James Kinneavy's Theory of Discourse in 1971, English departments began incorporating rhetoric into their composition classrooms. In doing this, composition instructors have placed more emphasis on teaching audience analysis, Aristotle's rhetorical appeals (ethos, pathos, and logos), and teaching Kinneavy's modes of discourse.

According to Brian Sutton in "Writing in the Disciplines, First-Year Composition, and the Research Paper", since 1980, there has been an increasing debate in academic circles as to whether the "generic" approach to writing in first year composition is useful for students whose future writing will be discipline specific.

=== Basic writing ===
First described by Mina Shaughnessy in the 1970s, basic writing is a division of composition studies that strives to bring disadvantaged students entering college to a more complete understanding of the rhetorical aspects of the writing process.

== Approaches ==
There are a number of different composition theories and pedagogies that educators use to teach first-year composition. The second edition of A Guide to Composition Pedagogies identifies 17 different composition pedagogies, a few of which that relate to first-year composition are summarized below:

=== Genre ===
Genre pedagogy is meant to focus the student's attention on the purpose of a given piece of text, through the lens of genre. Some perspectives favor instruction on the specific traits of a given established genre, particularly for those who are learning English as a second language. Others espouse the view that students should learn to identify elements of writing—style and conventions, for example—which denote its usefulness in a given setting as genre elements and know when to use them appropriately. Another form of genre pedagogy involves evaluating the characteristics of given genres, including the sensibilities they instantiate and which individuals or perspectives are excluded by them.

=== Literature and composition ===
Literature and composition, as an approach to teaching, is premised upon the integration of literature as the content for a composition course. Literature is strategically threaded through the writing course providing learners with in-depth comprehensive information, empowering their contribution to a variety of literary conversations. In this approach, literature provides learners with a plethora of opportunities for the development of writing skills including topics for debates, arguments, discussions, and general exploration of humanity. Discourses for discovery with this methodology are inclusive of gender, race, ethnicity, culture, feminism, social issues, politics, and religion.

=== Process ===
As the name suggests, process pedagogy utilizes classroom time by discussing the entire writing process. A class that implements process pedagogy aims to improve students' skills as writers by working in one or more groups on brainstorming, revising, proofreading, and "workshopping" students' work before they submit a final draft. After first-year composition students will have learned strategies for the skills. Before submitting a final successful draft students would complete multiple drafts. Through the use of process pedagogy, the students' own writing acts as a text for the class which they use and learn from in order to become better writers. Some critics suggest that students will have trouble applying the skills they learned to other contexts.

=== Researched writing ===
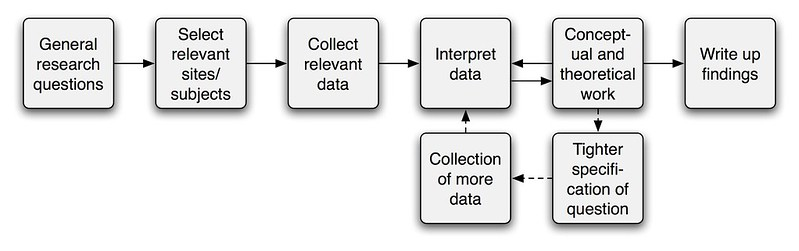
The research method is a major factor of the research skills taught throughout the researched writing approach

The original purpose of assigning research papers in first-year composition was to assist students in developing research skills. Along with these skills came the emphasis of learning to incorporate sources to strengthen a paper's thesis. In recent years, a shift towards teaching information literacy skills and including multimedia has become more common in academia. Traditional research papers assigned to students have been on a decline since the 2000s, a survey from 2009 shows that 6% of research writing in first-year composition were traditional research papers while 94% were an alternative take.
