= LSU Communication across the Curriculum =

LSU Communication across the Curriculum is a program at Louisiana State University (LSU) that works to improve the communications skills of students. This includes writing, public speaking, visual and technological communication skills. The program is a successor to the Writing across the Curriculum and Writing in the Disciplines programs.

Historically, academia has focused on improving students' writing skills, but has put little emphasis on communication skills as a whole to include, incorporating oral competencies, visual literacy, and application of technological communication tools in addition to writing.

LSU is the only institutionalized program that equally emphasizes written, spoken, visual, and technological communication within disciplines. The LSU Communication across the Curriculum program has adjusted its model to benefit from the knowledge of what has and has not worked at other institutions, and takes into account the rapidly changing demands of communication in the 21st century.
