= WePapers =

wePapers
- Website type: Academic Writing
- Website: https://www.wepapers.com/
- Commercial: Yes
- Launched: November 2008
- Current status: Active

WePapers is an academic writing and research aid platform that offers content production services, including papers ghostwriting, essay creation, editing, proofreading, and plagiarism check.

WePapers was previously a document-sharing website, geared mainly towards college and university students, although fully accessible by anyone. WePapers allowed users to share and find documents within various academic fields. wePapers also allows users and classes to create virtual communities. WePapers used Adobe Flash technology to display documents from all major types (Word, PowerPoint, PDF, OpenOffice.org Documents, etc.) within the web browser, on the wePapers website. WePapers also allowed users to embed documents on their own web pages, as well as download and print out the documents.

The company was founded by Israeli entrepreneurs and students Hanan Weiskopf and Ehud Zamir, in October 2008. WePapers initially began as a blog which Weiskopf created for one of his classes. WePapers.com launched later that year.
