= Prose =

Ordinary conversational form of language

Prose is language that is natural or normal in structure: following the spontaneous flow of conversational speech, without any perfectly regular rhythm; containing ordinary grammar patterns; or, in writing, aligning to typical conventions and formatting. It thus can range in its exact medium from informal everyday speaking to formal academic writing. Prose differs most notably from poetry, which follows some type of contrived intentional rhythm or other artistically crafted structure or pattern. Poetic structures vary dramatically by language; in English poetry, for instance, language is often organized by a rhythmic metre or rhyme scheme.

The day-to-day informal language of a region or community, and many other forms and styles of language usage, fall under prose, a label that can describe both speech and writing. In writing, poetry is traditionally written in a special format called verse: a series of lines stacked on top of one another on a page. This parallels how a person might read the poem aloud; for example, poetry may end with a rhyme at the end of each line, making the entire work more melodious or memorable. Prose uses writing conventions and formatting that may highlight meaning—for instance, the use of a new paragraph for a new speaker in a novel—but does not follow any special rhythmic or other artistic structure.

The word "prose" first appeared in English in the 14th century. It is derived from the Old French prose, which in turn originates in the Latin expression prosa oratio (literally, straightforward or direct speech). In highly-literate cultures where spoken rhetoric is considered relatively unimportant, definitions of prose may be narrower, including only written language (but not including written speech or dialogue). In written languages, spoken and written prose usually differ sharply. Sometimes, these differences are transparent to those using the languages; linguists studying extremely literal transcripts for conversation analysis see them, but ordinary language-users are unaware of them.

Academic writing (works of philosophy, history, economics, etc.), journalism, and fiction are usually written in prose (excepting verse novels etc.). Developments in 20th century literature, including free verse, concrete poetry, and prose poetry, have led to the idea of poetry and prose as two ends on a spectrum rather than firmly distinct from each other. The British poet T. S. Eliot noted, whereas "the distinction between verse and prose is clear, the distinction between poetry and prose is obscure."

== History ==
Latin was a major influence on the development of prose in many European countries. Especially important was the great Roman orator Cicero (106–43 BC). It was the lingua franca among literate Europeans until quite recent times, and the great works of Descartes (1596–1650), Francis Bacon (1561–1626), and Baruch Spinoza (1632–1677) were published in Latin. Among the last important books written primarily in Latin prose were the works of Swedenborg (d. 1772), Linnaeus (d. 1778), Euler (d. 1783), Gauss (d. 1855), and Isaac Newton (d. 1727).

Latin had almost universally been used in Italy until the close of the 13th century, when Dante created a vernacular prose in the non-metrical part of his famous Vita Nuova, written about 1293.

About the year 1200, verse began to be abandoned by French chroniclers who had some definite statements to impart, and who had no natural gifts as poets. The earliest French prose was translated from the Latin, but Baldwin VI., who died in 1205, is said to have commissioned several scribes to compile in the vulgar tongue a history of the world.

The earliest coherent attempts at the creation of German prose belong to the age of Charlemagne, and the first example usually quoted is the Strassburger Eidschwüre of 842. For all literary purposes, however, metrical language was used exclusively during the mittelhochdeutsch period, which lasted until the end of the 13th century.

Latin's role was replaced by French from the 17th to the mid-20th century, i.e. until the uptake of English:

For about three hundred years French prose was the form in which the European intelligence shaped and communicated its thoughts about history, diplomacy, definition, criticism, human relationships — everything except metaphysics. It is arguable that the non-existence of a clear, concrete German prose has been one of the chief disasters to European civilisation.

== Qualities ==
Prose usually lacks the more formal metrical structure of the verses found in traditional poetry. It comprises full grammatical sentences (other than in stream of consciousness narrative), and paragraphs, whereas poetry often involves a metrical or rhyming scheme. Some works of prose make use of rhythm and verbal music. Verse is normally more systematic or formulaic, while prose is closer to both ordinary, and conversational speech.

In Molière's play Le Bourgeois gentilhomme the character Monsieur Jourdain asked for something to be written in neither verse nor prose, to which a philosophy master replies: "there is no other way to express oneself than with prose or verse", for the simple reason that "everything that is not prose is verse, and everything that is not verse is prose".

American novelist Truman Capote, in an interview, commented as follows on prose style:

I believe a story can be wrecked by a faulty rhythm in a sentence— especially if it occurs toward the end—or a mistake in paragraphing, even punctuation. Henry James is the maestro of the semicolon. Hemingway is a first-rate paragrapher. From the point of view of ear, Virginia Woolf never wrote a bad sentence. I don't mean to imply that I successfully practice what I preach. I try, that's all.

=== Types ===
Many types of prose exist, which include those used in works of nonfiction, prose poem, alliterative prose and prose fiction.

- A prose poem – is a composition in prose that has some of the qualities of a poem.
- Haikai prose – combines haiku and prose.
- Prosimetrum – is a poetic composition which exploits a combination of prose and verse (metrum); in particular, it is a text composed in alternating segments of prose and verse. It is widely found in Western and Eastern literature.
- Purple prose – is prose that is so extravagant, ornate, or flowery as to break the flow and draw excessive attention to itself.

=== Divisions ===
Prose is divided into two main divisions:

- Fiction
- Non-fiction
