= Priscilla Tyler =

Priscilla Tyler may refer to:

- Priscilla Cooper Tyler (1816–1889), first lady of the United States
- Priscilla Tyler (educator) (1908–?), American educator and scholar of composition and world literature
