= Donald Murray (writer) =

American journalist (1924–2006)

Donald Morison Murray (September 16, 1924 – December 30, 2006) was an American journalist and English professor. He wrote for many journals, authored several books on the art of writing and teaching, and served as writing coach for several national newspapers. After writing multiple editorials about changes in American military policy for the Boston Herald, he won the 1954 Pulitzer Prize for Editorial Writing. For 20 years, he wrote the Boston Globe's "Over 60" column, eventually renamed "Now And Then". He taught at the University of New Hampshire for 26 years.

== Early life and education ==
Murray was born in Boston, Massachusetts, and grew up nearby in Quincy. He graduated from Tilton School, a college preparatory school in Tilton, New Hampshire. A paratrooper during World War II, he attended the University of New Hampshire, graduating with a degree in English in 1948. He got his start as a copyboy at the Boston Herald and became a staff reporter in 1949. After working briefly for Time magazine and as a freelance writer in the 1950s, Murray joined the University of New Hampshire faculty in 1963.

== On writing ==
Murray chronicled his relationship with writing until the day he died. In a column published just before his death, he wrote, "Each time I sit down to write I don't know if I can do it. The flow of writing is always a surprise and a challenge. Click the computer on and I am 17 again, wanting to write and not knowing if I can". His final column was published in the Boston Globe five days before his death.

Throughout his book, Crafting a Life, Murray demonstrates his writing process and provides guidelines for readers developing their own writing. He notes authors who have provided inspiration for his personal writing like Graham Greene and George Orwell. Orwell's essay Why I Write is especially apparent in Murray's motivation to write. When considering how to begin his own writing, Murray said, "I remembered them as being unexpected but true to what happens in the essay". In Crafting a Life, he lists and explains his manifesto: I write to say I am, discover who I am, create life, understand my life, slay my dragons, exercise my craft, lose myself in my work, for revenge, to share, to testify, to avoid boredom, and to celebrate. Murray compared a writer's voice in language to music and deemed its significance as the key factor in capturing an audience. In addressing the complexities of voice in writing, Murray noted the following elements as important to developing a writer's voice: revealing specifics, the word, the phrase, the beat, and the point of view. He encourages writers to write with their readers as new stories are composed. To demonstrate this, he provides examples of his own writing and along with that, writes what the reader might think or say in response. He then discusses, briefly, researching certain topics to strengthen the ethos of the writer.

Murray encouraged the writer to embrace and not fear self-exposure. "In effective writing and, especially in personal-essay writing, the author exposes himself or herself, revealing thoughts and feelings that the reader had also experienced but may have denied…and that is the strength of many essays. It is, however, a problem for the writer who is usually uncomfortable about this exposure".

== Style and approach to writing ==
Murray's approach to writing relies on the concept of unfinished writing. Murray believes writing should be a process, not just a product, therefore it should never be finished. This approach involves teachers allowing their students to be in the driver's seat during the writing process; the student discovers where they want the paper to go before the teacher begins to correct or edit any writing. In this approach, the student explores their writing as a process that is constantly growing and never quite finished, empowering them to become more independent writers. Murray preaches the importance of discovery in writing to learn more about the world around you. Murray also advised "to be patient, and wait and wait and wait". Many have called Murray's approach to writing "writing-as-problem-solving".

Murray’s theory of the writing process requires thoughtful, recursive revision. In 1981, he wrote that revision “is not just clarifying meaning, it is discovering meaning and clarifying it while it is being discovered.” To achieve these ends, Murray argued that the writer must “go back again and again and again to consider what the writing means and if the writer can accept, document, and communicate that meaning. In other words, writing is not what the writer does after the thinking is done; writing is thinking.” Murray also believed it was essential that students care about their academic writing, to ensure their writing would be meaningful. he also implored teachers to allow their students to write about topics other than literature, as he understood that students were more likely to be invested in their writing if they were allowed to choose topics of great importance to them.

Murray believed that each editor should have his own checklist for revision. His check list involved reading for three things: focus, form and voice.

== Teaching ==
As a proponent of process theory in composition studies, Murray is credited for applying this theory in the classroom. He advised teachers, when teaching writing, to "be quiet, to listen, to respond". Murray advised teachers to avoid making editing corrections in early drafts as meaning is not always discovered by the writer in the first draft. Instead, he called on teachers to provide time to students for revising multiple drafts and promote revision as a natural occurrence as opposed to a tedious task or punishment. In the time allowed for multiple drafts, teachers employ Murray's idea of teaching "unfinished writing", where teachers can encourage students to feel excited about discovering their writing and focus on the meaning of their writing, rather than teachers focusing what is right and wrong in their students' writing.

While Murray's teaching strategies were especially popular in the late 20th century, his perspective on the writing process is found in the contemporary classroom for both secondary and postsecondary composition.

== Criticism ==
Because Murray emphasized the importance of the individual writer, composition theorists including James Berlin contended that he neglected the social aspect of writing. Post-process theorists also saw Murray and other proponents of process theory as enabling prescribed rules that limited the writer's ability to explore through writing and harked back to Current Traditional Rhetoric. Thomas Stewart also spoke to Murray's insistence on writing in solitude, and argued Murray's "complicated aloneness" strongly influenced his writing pedagogy.

== Personal life ==
Murray's first marriage ended in divorce. In 1951, he married Minnie Mae Emmerich Murray and his wife had three children, Anne, Hannah, and Lee. Daughter Lee died at 20 years of age and Murray later wrote about the experience in The Lively Shadow: Living with the Death of a Child.

Murray died in December 2006 from heart failure in Durham, New Hampshire at the age of 82. He donated over 100 of his writing journals — or, as he called them, "daybooks" — to the Poynter Institute, a non-profit school for journalism with which he had long been associated.

== Books ==
- Man Against Earth: The Story of Tunnels and Tunnel Builders (J.B. Lippincott. Philadelphia, 1961).
- The Man Who Had Everything (New American Library, 1964).
- The World of Sound Recording (J.B. Lippincott. Philadelphia, 1965).
- A Writer Teaches Writing: a Practical Method of Teaching Composition (Houghton Mifflin, 1968).
- Learning by Teaching (Heinemann, 1982).
- Expecting the Unexpected (Heinemann, 1989).
- Crafting a Life in Essay, Story, Poem (Boynton/Cook, 1996).
- Write to Learn (Harcourt Brace, 1998).
- The Craft of Revision (Harcourt Brace, 1998).
- A Writer Teaches Writing (Holt, Rinehart, and Winston, 1990).
- The Literature of Tomorrow: an anthology of student fiction, poetry, and drama (1990).
- Writing to Deadline. The Journalist at Work. (Heinemann, 2000).
- My Twice-Lived Life: A Memoir (Ballantine Books, 2001).
- The Lively Shadow: Living with the Death of a Child (Ballantine, 2003).
- The Essential Don Murray: Lessons from America's Greatest Writing Teacher (Boynton/Cook, 2009).
- Shoptalk: Learning to Write with Writers (heinemann, 1990).
- Read to Write: A Writing Process Reader (Dryden, 1993).
- Writing for Your Readers: Notes on the Writer's Craft from the Boston Globe (UNKNO, 1992).
