= Process theory of composition =

The process theory of composition (hereafter referred to as "process") is a field of composition studies that focuses on writing as a process rather than a product. Based on Janet Emig's breakdown of the writing process, the process is centered on the idea that students determine the content of the course by exploring the craft of writing using their own interests, language, techniques, voice, and freedom, and where students learn what people respond to and what they don't. Classroom activities often include peer work where students themselves are teaching, reviewing, brainstorming, and editing.

== History ==
The ideas behind process were born out of increased college enrollment thanks to the GI Bill following World War II. Writing instructors began giving students more group work and found that, with guidance, students were able to identify and recognize areas that needed improvement in other students' papers, and that criticism also helped students recognize their own areas to strengthen. Composition scholars such as Janet Emig, Peter Elbow, and Donald Murray began considering how these methods could be used in the writing classroom. Emig, in her book The Composing Processes of Twelfth Graders, showed the complexity of the writing process; this process was later simplified into a basic three-step process by Murray: prewriting, writing, and rewriting (also called "revision"). In her 1975 study, Sondra Perl demonstrated that college writers who had been labeled as "unskilled" or "basic" writers nonetheless engaged in sophisticated and recursive writing processes. However, those processes sometimes became unproductive when the writers became too worried about editing errors. Perl later developed her theory of embodied writing process, grounded in a "felt sense" that writers can learn to access to guide their writing process.

Process theory had many philosophies behind it following its creation. From the 1970s to the early 1990s, scholars such as Richard Fulkerson and Nancy Sommers, have explored ways to teach their students more effectively and studied the guidance needed for the teachers to improve their students' writing.

Process also gained prominence in the collegiate world as a reaction against the formalism composition methods, sometimes called "current-traditional" methods, that encouraged adherence to established modes of writing, such as the five-paragraph essay.

== Teaching methods and implications ==
Process can be taught using a variety of methods intended to strengthen the relationship between students and instructor. In other words, classroom discussion and activities center on students' ability to mimic what has come before in hopes that they will understand what good writing is and learn to mimic it. Some of the methods include:

- Prewriting activities. These could include brainstorming and/or other freewriting activities, drawing conceptual maps, participating in an ethnographic study, research, and more.
- Drafting. Class time can be spent writing papers, and students can ask instructors for ideas or help.
- Revision. Instructors can designate class time for the revision of drafts and direct students to focus on rhetorical strategies.
- Portfolio-based assessment. Students are given a deadline, such as the end of a semester, and a goal, such as demonstrating skills like rhetorical awareness, conventional thinking, and source acceptance and integration. The intervening time is spent drafting and revising papers. Composition instructors serve as final authorities on the quality of work, helping students explore areas foreign to them, rather than more free wheeling teachers who tell students how to express their individuality. From among the papers they work on in the semester, students choose the papers the instructor considers to be their best and put them in a portfolio, which is graded by the instructor. Often students are graded on their drafts during the semester as well as on the work they produce at the end of it.
- Reflection on the writing process.

== Critiques of Process ==
Thomas Kent argues that process theories insist, “writing can be captured by a generalized process or a Big Theory,” and that process theory makes three central claims about writing: “(1) writing is private; (2) writing is not up for interpretation; and (3) writing can, and should be, highly organized.”

When writing is conceived of and taught as a prescriptive and generalizable “process,” according to Gary Olson, useful implications arise in the creation of a Theory of Writing, a master narrative that attempts to “systematize something that simply is not susceptible to systematization.”

Similarly, George Pullman positions the writing process movement as a rhetorical narrative, positioned in history as a result of writing as an undervalued, utilitarian skill that could be universally transmitted in higher education (17). This emerged from “current traditional rhetoric” that originated at Harvard in the 1880s and peaked in the late 1960s. Writing became a highly scientific affair, rooted exclusively in empirical observation. Post-process theorists argue, however, that if the writing process “were really the way all successful writers write regardless of context, then unless all writing is somehow supportive of a single ideological system, there would be no obfuscatory ideological baggage attending the process."

Theorists continue to discuss pedagogical and systemic implications of both process and post-process approaches to composition.

Process theorists themselves have had to identify and work around certain constraints the process method brings with it; namely:

=== Constraints for students ===
If papers are not graded throughout the semester, students don't have any idea of the grade they are earning. Also, students might not be inclined to take control of the class content and decide what they want to explore; they may expect the instructor to provide material for them. Additionally, students may not improve their grammar and other writing conventions if content is emphasized over form.

=== Constraints for composition instructors ===
Composition classes are often overfilled, so instructors have to spend much of their time reading through drafts. Power can also be a struggle, for if student grades depend on a portfolio, then instructors have to find ways of encouraging and/or enforcing attendance. And if there are no rules as to what students may and may not write about, instructors have to be well-versed in a variety of discourses and ready to deal with conflict that may arise when two or more discourses meet (sometimes called a contact zone). Instructors must also find ways to encourage each student to explore and bring content to the course and must deal with diversity and a range of opinions on what should be done in the course.

Process rose to prominence in composition classrooms during the late 1960s and enjoyed its status as the gold standard method of teaching through the 1980s and into the 1990s. Many of its tenets are still used today; however, its popularity and methods have brought criticism from different composition theorists, such as post-process theorists, who charge that:

- Process theory is rules-oriented just like the current-traditional method it had sought to escape.
- It doesn't teach basic skills and conventions (grammar, style, etc.).
- It doesn't acknowledge issues of race/class/gender because it was so focused on the writer's language and experience.
- It doesn't recognize the significance of context, again because it was focused on the writer's experience.

Amir Kalan (2014) has explored the pedagogical potentials of post-process theory in an article entitled "A Practice-Oriented Definition of Post-Process Second Language Writing Theory".

== See also ==
- Composition studies
- Critical pedagogy
- Ecocomposition
- Collaborative Pedagogy
