= Priscilla Tyler (educator) =

US educator and scholar of composition and world literature

- Occupation: English teacher

Academic background
- Education: Case Western Reserve University

Academic work
- Discipline: English
- Sub-discipline: English Education
- Institutions: University of Illinois Urbana-Champaign

Priscilla Tyler (October 23, 1908) was an American educator and scholar of composition and world literature. She served as the first female chair of the Conference on College Composition and Communication and as vice president of the National Council of Teachers of English in 1963.

== Biography ==
Tyler was born in Cleveland, Ohio to Alice Lorraine Campbell and Ralph Sargent Tyler. She received her bachelor's in Latin and Greek from Radcliffe College in 1932. She went on to earn her master's degree in education from Case Western Reserve University in 1934. After completing her studies, she briefly worked as a parole officer and case worker at the Cleveland School for Girls, after which she worked in public schools as an English, Latin, and French teacher. She returned to Case Western Reserve University to obtain her doctorate in English, which she completed in 1953. She achieved the rank of assistant professor at Flora Stone Mather College, serving as assistant dean from 1957 to 1959.

Tyler went on to be an assistant professor of English Education and department chair at Harvard University. Tyler's 1961 course on composing processes inspired Janet Emig to complete her important work on the writing process. Tyler did not have much status in the department. A year later, Tyler's contract was not renewed and she left Harvard. After her time at Harvard, Tyler chaired the Conference on College Composition and Communication in 1963 and also served as vice president of the National Council of Teachers of English. The 1963 CCC Conference "Toward a New Rhetoric" included influential papers by Wayne C. Booth, Josephine Miles, Francis Christensen, and Edward P.J. Corbett. The conference also noted that the field of composition studies was still very heterogeneous at this point, representing a conglomerate of teachers of linguistics, literature, and writing.

Tyler later moved to the University of Illinois Urbana-Champaign, where she also served as director of freshman rhetoric from 1966 to 1967. She went on to teach at many different universities. As of 1974, Tyler was included in the Dictionary of International Biography, Leaders in Education, Two Thousand Women of Achievement, Who's Who of American Women, and The World Who's Who of Women. She was also a promoter of non-Western humanities.

== Works ==
- "The Status of the Profession." College Composition and Communication 12.2 (1961), pp. 79–83. https://www.jstor.org/stable/pdf/355441
- Writers the Other Side of the Horizon: A Guide to Developing Literatures of the World. NCTE, 1964.
- World's Literature Written in English: Presented at the Conference on Black Literature: Its Value in the Curriculum. 1969.
- "Non-Western Humanities in the Americas: A Definition." Educational Horizons 53.1 (1974), 4–14.
