= Research proposal =

Description of planned research for which funding is requested

A research proposal is a document proposing a research project, generally in the sciences or academia, and generally constitutes a request for sponsorship of that research. Proposals are evaluated on the cost and potential impact of the proposed research, and on the soundness of the proposed plan for carrying it out. Research proposals generally address several key points:

- What research question(s) will be addressed, and how they will be addressed
- How much time and expense will be required for the research
- What prior research has been done on the topic
- How the results of the research will be evaluated
- How the research will benefit the sponsoring organization and other parties

== Types ==
Research proposals may be solicited, meaning that they are submitted in response to a request with specified requirements, such as a request for proposal, or they may be unsolicited, meaning they are submitted without prior request. Other types of proposals include "preproposals", where a letter of intent or brief abstract is submitted for review prior to submission of a full proposal; continuation proposals, which re-iterate an original proposal and its funding requirements in order to ensure continued funding; and renewal proposals, which seek continued sponsorship of a project which would otherwise be terminated.

Academic research proposals are generally written as part of the initial requirements of writing a thesis, research paper, or dissertation. They generally follow the same format as a research paper, with an introduction, a literature review, a discussion of research methodology and goals, and a conclusion. This basic structure may vary between projects and between fields, each of which may have its own requirements.
