= Janet Emig =

American composition scholar

Janet Emig (born October 12, 1928 in Cincinnati, Ohio - died November 16, 2025 in Napls, Florida) was an American composition scholar. She is known for her groundbreaking 1971 study The Composing Process of Twelfth Graders (National Council of Teachers of English Research Report No. 13), which contributed to the development of the process theory of composition. Her article, "Writing as a Mode of Learning" (1977) is also frequently cited and anthologized by the Writing Across the Curriculum movement.

== Life ==
Janet A. Emig was born in Cincinnati, Ohio. She learned to read from her great-aunt Eleanora Berne. In the 1930s she attended Williams Avenue Grade School in Norwood, Ohio, which espoused a Deweyan educational philosophy. She graduated from Walnut Hills High School in 1946.

Emig attended Mount Holyoke College for her undergraduate studies. She graduated magna cum laude and wrote a novel, The Sand and the Rock as her senior thesis.

Emig attended the University of Michigan for her master's program, initially interested in her development as a creative writer. At the University of Michigan she faced sexism from her instructors and observed sexism in faculty promotions. When she graduated in 1952, she was denied for the doctoral program.

After graduation, Emig taught in public schools, including the Hillsdale School for Girls and Wyoming High School. Betty Williams, the chair of her English Department, encouraged Emig to attend the 1960 Conference on College Composition and Communication that was held in Cincinnati. There, she met Priscilla Tyler, who presented on structural linguistics. This talk inspired Emig to attend Tyler's summer course on composing processes offered at Harvard in 1961. Emig applied to the Harvard English Education program for that fall and was accepted.

Unfortunately, Harvard decided not to renew Tyler's contract, and the other faculty member in the program was fired for sexual harassment. Without faculty in her specialization within her first two weeks of arrival, Emig had to chart her own interdisciplinary course of study. Emig managed a course on the history of education with Tyler, as well as courses in psychology, linguistics (at MIT), and the philosophy of education. She began presenting at the Conference on College Composition and Communication and published papers such as "The Relation of Thought and Language Implicit in Some Early American Rhetoric and Composition Textbooks," "We are Trying Conferences," "The Uses of the Unconscious in Composing," "On Teaching Composition: Some Hypotheses as Definitions," and "Language Learning and the Teaching Process." Before the 1964 study Pre-Writing: The Construction and Application of Models for Concept Formation in Writing, Emig was already thinking about and researching pre-writing. She also helped develop the Harvard Master of Arts in Teaching. In 1965, she worked as director of the Masters of Arts in Teaching program at the University of Chicago School of Education. Still, Emig faced bias against the study of writing at Harvard. She went through ten different advisers between 1961 and 1969, and eventually graduated with MIT linguist Wayne O'Neil as her committee chair. O'Neil put her in contact with James N. Britton, an important composition theorist in England. While Emig failed her tenure review at Chicago and left to work at the University of Lethbridge in Alberta, Canada, she continued to work on revising her dissertation for publication. Her 1969 dissertation, "Components of the Composing Process Among Twelfth-Grade Students" was the basis for The Composing Process of Twelfth Graders (1971).

Along with other Americans, Emig was fired from Lethbridge and took a position as associate professor at Rutgers University, a state university, where she did secure tenure. She stayed there for the rest of her career. She continued to publish on the psychology of writing, constructivism, and the profession, and continued to enjoy interdisciplinary research. She became director of the New Jersey Writing Project in 1977. Despite her now star status, Emig still faced challenges with promotion to full professor in the 1980s.

As Gerald Nelms explains, Emig argues for a more complex understanding of the writing process that is based in constructivism rather than positivism. She also remains interested in the overall development of written language acquisition. Many of her later works are published in the collection The Web of Meaning: Essays on Writing, Teaching, Learning, and Thinking (2006). She was the Conference on College Composition and Communication 1992 Exemplar Awardee. The National Council of Teachers of English ELATE Janet Emig Award for research in English Education is named in her honor.

== Works ==
- "We Are Trying Conferences." English Journal 49 (April 1960): 223-28.
- "The Relation of Thought and Language Implicit in Some Early American Rhetoric and Composition Texts." Qualifying Paper. Harvard Graduate School of Education, 1963. Rpt. in Web of Meaning.
- "The Uses of the Unconscious in Composing." College Composition and Communication (February 1964): 6-11. Rpt. in Web of Meaning 46-53.
- Janet Emig, James T. Fleming, and Helen M. Popp, eds. Language and Learning. NY: Harcourt, Brace and World, 1966.
- "On Teaching Composition: Some Hypotheses as Definitions." Research in the Teaching of English 1 (1967): 127-35.
- "Language Learning and the Teaching Process." Elementary English 44 (Oct. 1967): 602-8,709.
- "The Origins of Rhetoric: A Developmental View." School Review (Sept. 1969): Rpt. in Web of Meaning 55-60.
- "Components of the Composing Process Among Twelfth-Grade Writers." Diss. Harvard, 1969.
- The Composing Processes of Twelfth Graders. Research Report No. 13. Urbana, IL: National Council of Teachers of English, 1971.
- "Children and Metaphor." Research in the Teaching of English (Fall 1972): Rpt. in Web of Meaning 99-108.
- "Hand, Eye, Brain: Some ‘Basics’ in the Writing Process." Research on Composing: Points of Departure. Ed. Charles Cooper and Lee Odell. Urbana, IL: National Council of Teachers of English, 1974. 59-71. Rpt. in Web of Meaning 110-21.
- "The Biology of Writing; Another View of the Process." The Writing Processes of Students. Ed. W. T. Petty and P. J. Finn. Buffalo: State U of New York, Department of Elementary and Remedial Education, 1975. 11-20.
- (With Robert P. Parker, Jr.). "Responding to Student Writing: Building a Theory of the Evaluating Process." Unpublished paper. 1976.
- "Writing as a Mode of Learning." College Composition and Communication 28 (1977): 122-28. Rpt. in Web of Meaning 123-31.
- "The Tacit Tradition: The Inevitability of a Multi-Disciplinary Approach to Writing Research." Reinventing the Rhetorical Tradition. Ed. Aviva Freedman and Ian Pringle. Ottawa: Canadian Council of Teachers of English, 1980. Rpt. in Web of Meaning 146-56.
- "Journal of a Pessimist: Prospects for Academic Women in the Eighties." Journal of Education 162 (Summer 1980): 50-56.
- "Inquiry Paradigms and Writing." College Composition and Communication (February 1981): Rpt. in Web of Meaning 159-70.
- Introduction. Four Worlds of Writing. By Janice Lauer, Gene Montague, Andrea Lunsford, and Janet Emig. NY: Harper and Row, 1981.1-15. 2nd ed. 1985.1-18.
- "Literacy and Freedom." Keynote Address. Conference on College Composition and Communication, San Francisco, March 1982. Rpt. in Web of Meaning 171-78.
- "Non-Magical Thinking: Presenting Writing Developmentally in Schools " Writing: The Nature, Development and Teaching of Written Communication. Vol. 2. Lawrence Erlbaum Associates, 1982. Rpt. in Web of Meaning 135-44.
- "Writing, Composition, and Rhetoric." Encyclopedia of Educational Research. 5th ed. 1982.2021-35.
- The Web of Meaning: Essays on Writing Teaching Learning and Thinking. Upper Montclair, NJ: Boynton/Cook, 1983.
- (With June Birnbaum). "Case Study." Handbook of Research in the English/Language Arts. Ed. James Squire and Julie Jensen. NY: Macmillan, 1989.
