= Theories of rhetoric and composition pedagogy =

Theories of how to teach writing

Theories of rhetoric and composition pedagogy encompass a wide range of interdisciplinary fields centered on the instruction of writing. Noteworthy to the discipline is the influence of classical Ancient Greece and its treatment of rhetoric as a persuasive tool. Derived from the Greek work for public speaking, rhetoric's original concern dealt primarily with the spoken word. In the treatise De Inventione, Cicero identifies five Canons of the field of rhetoric: invention, arrangement, style, memory, and delivery. Since its inception in the spoken word, theories of rhetoric and composition have focused primarily on writing.

== Early origins ==
From 1870 to 1900, as the American college system moved from small schools to a larger, diverse set of universities with distinct academic disciplines, the field of composition studies grew from traditional rhetorical studies. As pioneers in the field of composition studies, Harvard University enacted a new program in their English department that, for the first time, made "a total commitment to writing," though the initial focus was on personal writing and did not include rhetoric or literary analysis. However, the field of composition studies soon became paired with the field of rhetoric as the modern university developed, because scholars began to realize that elements of rhetoric and not "systematic grammatical study" were necessary to improve writing and composition abilities. While rhetoric traditionally concerned matters related to verbal orations or speeches, both rhetoric and composition are related to the expression of ideas, often in an attempt to influence one's audience. In addition, composition is also concerned with the principles of invention, arrangement, style, and delivery traditionally associated with rhetoric; even memory can become an element of composition when one is writing a speech or a scholarly paper to be delivered orally. Thus, rhetoric and composition—colloquially termed "rhet/comp" or "comp/rhet"—became a field of its own and remains a burgeoning discipline in universities today.

== Current-traditional rhetoric ==
The rhetoric and composition pedagogy developed in the late nineteenth century, and still used in many schools today, is known as current-traditional rhetoric, commonly referred to among field scholars, and hereinafter, as "CTR". CTR is defined by an emphasis on the final product, usually the five-paragraph, informal essay or short research paper on an objective topic. In addition, CTR centers around the notion that discourse is delivered in a prescribed, mechanical form, leading to its pedagogical focus on grammar, spelling, syntax, and uniform style and arrangement. Further, CTR promotes the idea that the purpose of writing is the product, which is expected to reflect a predefined, stagnant reality without consideration for process, authorial identity, or audience. For example, a CTR pedagogue might instruct his or her students to write an essay on bicycles; the expected outcome is an objective discussion of bicycles organized in a five-paragraph essay, the identity of the audience or the writer is not to be considered, and the goal is the final product—the "essay"— which should have no errors (or even intentional boundary-breakers) in grammar, spelling, or design. James Berlin and Robert Inkster examine typical CTR textbooks and evaluate their limited approach to teaching composition, concluding that CTR limits "discovery procedures," diminishes the "importance of the writer," and restricts writer engagement with the audience. Likewise, W. Ross Winterowd similarly contends that the pedagogy of CTR is dated and ultimately ineffective in his examination of a number of current-traditional textbooks.

CTR as pedagogy has been almost universally employed by schools since its inception in the late nineteenth century. Until the 1960s its limitations and ineffectiveness received little criticism. However, the 1966 Dartmouth Conference reflected an influx of new scholarly ideas about composition studies that introduced the ideas of process over product and the notion that teachers should serve as guides in the composition process rather than dictatorial authority figures. Since then, the main elements of composition pedagogy have been defined and explored by countless scholars, and the concepts associated with CTR have been replaced by a wealth of pedagogical approaches to the field of rhetoric and composition. In the late 1960s and early 1970s, the field of rhetoric and composition saw a process revolution, fueled by two distinct pedagogies: expressivism, both moderate and radical, and cognitivism.

== Moderate expressivism and radical expressivism ==
The composition pedagogy of moderate expressivism is characterized by a focus on language as a tool for personal rather than social expression, based on the process theory of composition, a belief that the process of writing should be more important than the final product. Further, moderate expressivist pedagogy calls for fewer grammatical standards and an increased focus on the writer's process of discovery and expression. W.E. Coles Jr. suggests that teaching writing should be approached as teaching art, with the teacher serving as facilitator or guide for the student-writer's free expression; he also calls for classroom practices such as peer-reviews, class discussions, and the absence of grades, in order to best guide the self-identification he sees as crucial to the writing process. Fellow moderate expressivist Donald Murray maintains that writing is a process of discovery and experimentation, a search for truth in a specious world; his manifesto-like essay provides an apt summation of the arguments against the dated pedagogy of CTR. Likewise, Maxine Hairston recognizes the paradigm shift occurring in rhetoric and composition and calls for a non-prescriptive atmosphere in teaching, including less focus on grammar and syntax and, again, more concern with the process of growth experienced by the writer. Peter Elbow reflects moderate expressivist ideals in his claim that audience should be ignored during the early stages of the writing process, in order to avoid the hindrance of audience expectation and facilitate writer-based rather than reader-based text. Elbow writes, "It's not that writers should never think about their audience. It's a question of when." Simply put, moderate expressivism promotes the notion of process over product, a pedagogy that evolved in the height of the 1960s and in many ways reflects the ideologies of the era in its emphasis on freedom, expression, discovery, and a search for the writer's authentic self.

It is through the belief in the importance of the process of writing that authors and educators present ideas of learning through writing. In doing so, they take on the ideas of self expression and using personal experience to form deeper connections to new topics. Furthermore, personal connections can act as the starting point for questioning new concepts leading to analysis. Another application is to begin writing as a daily task that will eventually be carried onto academics.

Radical expressivism evolved from the pedagogical ideals of moderate expressivism, and its primary difference lies in its focus on group, rather than individual, development and expression. For example, In 1966, Susan Sontag published a collection of essays in which she stresses the importance of Happenings, "a cross between art exhibit and theatrical performance," in order to facilitate a sense of group identity, community, and engagement with audience through a shared, unique artistic experience. Radical expressivists Charles Deemer and William Lutz also suggest that English composition should be taught as and considered a sort of Happening. Deemer locates the problem with the composition course in its lack of subject content and asserts that writing demands inspiration that can be attained from teacher-induced Happenings, as "clear writing and clear thought follow only after clear experiences." Lutz' claims are similar to those of Deemer, noting the need for creative inspiration in the classroom, a typically stagnant environment in which he claims nothing creative can be taught; he argues for the employment of Happenings in the English classroom in order to "make the student respond directly to his own experience and not someone else's." Other such pedagogues include Marshall McLuhan, who presents the idea of using hot, engaging media when teaching rather than cold, sterile media in the classroom, and Geoffrey Sirc, who promotes an avant-garde approach to composition pedagogy by encouraging students' exuberant, unpolished expressions in writing. Sirc can almost be considered a "post-social turn" theorist; his 1980s research claims that the traditional classroom space is confining and argues that the language of "Main Street" should be encouraged in student writing, attacking the idea of suitable "academic" writing presented by theorists like David Bartholomae. Furthermore, in his own English classroom, Sirc employs the study of rap music and its cultural and racial implications; he views rap music as "loaded with language, desire, style, and humanity" and imbued with poetry he describes as "blunt narratives of the human heart," teaching students about truth, communication, and reality and effectively strengthening their writing. Thus, while retaining many of the ideals of individuality and uninhibited expression associated with Moderate Expressivism, the composition pedagogy of radical expressivism is distinguished by its focus on group reality and community experience, belief in the art and inspirational potential of the Happening, and view that popular media can potentially be used as a pedagogical tool.

== Cognitivism ==
The pedagogy of cognitivism prevalent in the early 1970s and early 1980s also promotes the idea of process over product, but it is a more scientific approach to composition studies and is opposed to moderate expressivism in many ways. Abstractly speaking, cognitivists believe that thinking exists in the mind apart from language and are concerned with understanding how language—or writing—is developed from mental processes of the mind. Cognitivists are primarily concerned with the goals of a writer, the decisions made during the writing process by the mind. Andrea Lunsford addresses the importance of understanding the cognitive mental faculties involved during composition, claiming that the best way to facilitate the writing process is through workshops and discussion rather than lecture-based instruction. In practice, classrooms are used as a place to evaluate and adapt theory through students and their processing techniques. This is through individual experience, allowing exploration, and rejecting rigidity in the production of knowledge. Researchers like cognitivist Sondra Perl conduct extensive studies of the composing process and the stages through which a writer goes in order to better understand how to teach writing. Cognitivists Linda Flower and John Hayes see an exigency in composition studies to understand how and why a writer makes the choices they do during the writing process. Their research led them to claim that writing is a non-linear, hierarchal, goal-driven process. In addition, they concentrate their study of composition on the protocol of the writing process, including planning, translating, embedding, and reviewing. While like expressivists in their greater concern with the process of writing than with the final product, distinguishing them from the essay-driven pedagogy of current-traditional rhetoric, cognitivism proposes a more scientific approach by studying universal cognitive faculties of the mind in order to better understand the composition process.

== Social constructionism ==
Unlike cognitivism, social constructionism, or the "social turn" in composition pedagogy, which evolved the 1980s, is distinguished by the belief that language and the mind are inseparable, as an individual needs language in order to even think. Social constructionist theories also promote the idea that writing is inherently political in nature and that writers are each a part of a particular community of dialogue, or discourse community, with an assumed set of principles and a distinct language of its own. Patricia Bizzell directly attacks the early cognitivist contention that writing can be understood as distinct sets of mental processes, criticizing "inner-directed" theorists like Flowers and Hayes for focusing too much on the individual writer's language and learning processes and overlooking the importance of society and discourse communities in composition; on the other hand, "outer-directed" theorists like Bizzell recognize the extent to which thinking and language are conditioned by the social context and intended audience being addressed by the writer. Writing, Bizzell claims, "takes place within a community," and in order to improve composition, teachers should "explain what the community's conventions are." Social constructionist James Porter notes the "intertextuality" of all writing as interdependent, based on the principle that all speech and writing evolves from presumed meaning and accepted evidence as defined by each "discourse community," which Porter defines as "a group of individuals bound by a common interest who communicate through approved channels and whose discourse is regulated." Joseph Harris agrees with Porter, maintaining that writing is community-driven and noting that the purpose in writing is drawn from "being part of some ongoing discourse." However, Harris qualifies his argument by noting that, while writers act not as isolated individuals but as members of discourse communities with certain language, practices, and beliefs, the notion that academic or other discourse communities are "discursive utopias" existing without conflict is irrational. David Bartholomae suggests that students must be assimilated to a specialized discourse in order to write; he writes that students "have to invent the university by assembling and mimicking its language," learning the "requirements of [academic] convention," and understanding the "history of a discipline" in order to successfully write and communicate within that discipline. Suggesting an existing conflict between academics and writers, Peter Elbow argues that writing students should not be exposed to the dialogic discourse of academia, as it can be intimidating and ineffective; instead, Elbow suggests that students read and study each other's writings in the early stages of composition, in order to facilitate a sense of monologic freedom by focusing on the students' own unique voices.

The social turn in composition pedagogy witnessed a move for community ideology and a newfound acknowledgment of the social, economic, and political forces that affect writers and discourse. James Berlin states, "The question of ideology has never been far from discussions of writing instruction in the modern American college," and he notes that the writing classroom has always been a place for addressing questions pertaining to ideological subject matter such as class, race, economics, and civil rights. He proposes what is known as a social-epistemic model of writing instruction, in which the socially-constructed nature of knowledge and knowing is recognized. Berlin notes that "social epistemic rhetoric views knowledge as an arena of ideological conflict," and such a writing pedagogy "offers an explicit critique of economic, political, and social arrangements." Overall, the social turn in composition pedagogy represented a move for increased recognition of rhetorical discourse communities, the social, cultural, and political forces that influence the classroom, and the ways that ideology affects writers and the writing classroom.

== Critical pedagogy ==
Critical pedagogy was the next phase of pedagogical development in the field of composition studies, and its ideas evolved in the late 1980s and early 1990s. Lisa Delpit explores the way that power works in the classroom, shaped by varied socioeconomic and cultural conditions of students and teachers, results in alienation and miscommunication in the classroom that she terms the "silenced dialogue." Delpit names five specific aspects of the current 'culture of power' that defines the conflicting power dynamic in the classrooms. Paulo Freire criticizes the oppressive nature of education and the current educational system's use of the "banking model" approach to teaching, wherein students serve as depositories for information provided to them by the teacher. While Delpit suggests that the oppressed should be provided with the necessary skills to enable them to enter the culture of power, Freire demands a transformation of the culture of power through revolutionary, practical literary training. Furthermore, Freire posits that human beings are situated in certain temporal and spatial conditions that define who they are, either oppressor or oppressed, and he suggests that dialogue defines humanity. Likewise, Elizabeth Ellsworth discusses the oppressive myths that perpetuate power dynamics in the classroom, including racism on campuses. She calls for a new critical pedagogy "of the unknowable," suggesting a need to recognize the absence of universal notions of dialogue, rationality, or knowledge, and instead openly acknowledge the many differing social groups and discourse communities in every classroom. Thus, critical pedagogy can be seen as/in an activist pedagogy, taking into account political inequalities and empowering students to take action through their writing.

== Post-structuralism ==
The pedagogy of post-structuralism is marked by an attempt to redefine rhetoric as it relates to composition, drawing on post-modern ideology calling for new ideas in a modern world. For example, Victor Vitanza suggests that writing is an entity of its own, existing apart from institutions, social mores, and even writers. He believes that the intention of writing should be to infect the reader with new ideas that disrupt the rational, controlled world. Vitanza also notes that writing can be seen as a metadiscipline, as rhetoric applies to any field in which the artist attempts to convey a message, including photography and choreography, as writing is a performative and not authoritative act. Sharon Crowley views rhetoric as invention and discovery by identifying the available means of persuasion in making one's argument. Furthermore, Crowley believes rhetoric has a civic purpose, as it changes the society in which it is engaged; she attests that rhetoric is the art of giving effectiveness to truth, and notes that it is persuasive and always moving.

== Feminist critiques of rhetoric and composition ==
Feminist scholars have interrogated the primacy of the Greco-Roman rhetorical tradition and have expanded rhetoric to not only include writing but also Rhetorical listening arguing that traditional rhetorical scholarship relies heavily on male-dominated voices as the fount of rhetorical knowledge, while marginalizing and excluding women. Rhetoric scholars, such as James Herrick, acknowledges the importance of historical female figures like Aspasia remarking how she has traditionally been seen as an enigmatic figure who nonetheless did not have her own agency as an influential speaker and rhetor due to the constraints on women during that time Many feminist scholars however have reclaimed her significance in the Greco-Roman tradition. In "Aspasia's Purloined Letters: Historical Absence, Fictional Presence, and the Rhetoric of Silence" Melissa Ianetta writes that "upon examination, the fault line of gender reveals that women have indeed participated in and contributed to the rhetorical tradition, and that fault line reverberates down the corridors of past scholarship to the foundations of the Greek intellectual tradition. Our first obligation, then, as rhetorical scholars is to look backwards at all the unquestioned scholarship that has come before; then, we must begin to re-map our notion of rhetorical history."

Contemporary feminists have linked the mutual desires of social justice and composition and rhetoric into their pedagogies. Beth Godbee writes that in composition pedagogies "power underlies all relations; that systemic (and political) matters are also embodied (and personal); and that work that supports gender justice intersects with and must enact related forms of justice: racial justice, decolonization, Indigenous rights, and others."

Even in fields of composition that have traditionally tried to dismantle the Greco-Roman bias of rhetorical studies, which include contrastive rhetoric, there is still a limited perspective that did not fully appreciate the contributions of feminist scholars to the field. These movements towards rhetorical listening and social justice issues have become influential in rhetoric and composition. Whereas traditional rhetoric has focused on the Greco-Roman rhetorical appeal and canonic authors like Cicero, listening places emphasis on cross-cultural dialogue and mutual understanding and opens possibilities for incorporating intersectional commonalities and differences.

== Contemporary movements ==
The fields of composition and rhetoric remain in flux, as scholars continue to debate regarding appropriate pedagogical methods and the best approach to teaching the art of writing. Since the post-structuralism movement in composition pedagogy, there has been an explosion of discussion in the field of composition pedagogy. More recent ideas in composition pedagogy include the notion of rhetoric's relationship to travel, on which pedagogues such as Gregory Clark and Nedra Reynolds have written. In addition, composition studies is an umbrella term for the considerations of writing pedagogy. In its academic application, it is post-modern or post-structural, working both outside and within other academic disciplines. The national Conference on College Composition and Communication (CCCC) was a national professional association of writing instructors in the United States, the largest organization dedicated to writing research, theory, and teaching pedagogy worldwide. At the annual CCCC convention, pedagogues from around the country delivered their recent research and theories to colleagues. The future of the annual CCCC convention is in flux, as the convention's parent organization, NCTE, made the unilateral decision to dissolve the organization in 2026. While the goals, methods, and desired results in composition studies are debated and continue to evolve, the importance of writing to the field of education has been indisputably recognized, despite NCTE's recent actions.

== See also ==
- Rogerian argument
