= Cultural studies theory of composition =

The cultural studies theory of composition (hereafter referred to as "cultural studies") is a field of composition studies that examines both writing as an artifact of culture and the contexts of writing situations. It also examines what happens to writing when cultures come into contact with each other, situations often referred to as "contact zones".

== How cultural studies began ==
Cultural studies arose in the 1970s and 1980s as a way of empowering otherwise disenfranchised voices: those who did not follow common or accepted political or social norms. It is a way of challenging an established power by investigating issues of "multiculturalism, the politics of literacy, and the implications of race, class, and gender". Within the discipline exists a variety of agendas and methods, but the fundamental idea behind cultural studies is to give voice to "the masses" and encourage representation of all cultures within a society.

Cultural studies pedagogy tends to include examinations of pop culture and media texts and rhetoric. Cultural studies is influential in the composition classroom because it enables instructors to help students write about subjects they were familiar with and to "teach close reading and interpretation of texts....substituting popular culture or media for literary texts"; allows for the idea that we are inundated by culture in everything we see and read, and so it is useful in the composition classroom to analyze, examine, close-read, and understand the meaning in and around the texts.

== Teaching methods and implications ==
Cultural studies composition instructors can use a variety of genres for students to work within and between. They include:
-- Production-based studies (emphasizes the producer; the "political organization of the conditions of production")
-- Text-based studies (i.e. literary criticism)
-- Studies of lived culture (ethnographic, historic, semiotic looks at how people are enculturated or contextualized)

Classroom methods include using pop culture and media studies into composition classrooms. Often these sources tend to allow students to write about what they know and to close-read and interpret texts about culture instead of literature. It helps students contextualize their own experiences. Teachers use multicultural texts that introduce and encourage discussions of multiple literacies, the implications of power, and the "contact zones" where cultures overlap and potentially collide.

When it comes to the personal essay, students from different multicultural backgrounds will bring different approaches, from the way the begin their stories to the information they choose to address. This means that workshopping the personal narrative (or, perhaps, any writing) in a classroom full of diversity can bring challenges, not just with understanding each other's words, but also with understanding meaning.

== Critiques of cultural studies ==
Critics have debated the ethics of professors pitching their soapboxes in class. Others accuse cultural studies compositionists as teaching an ideology, not writing.

== Current directions of cultural studies ==
One of the directions cultural studies is taking, is for civic- and community-service-oriented composition classes.
