= Peter Elbow =

American academic (1935–2025)

- Born: April 14, 1935; New York City, U.S.
- Died: February 6, 2025 (aged 89); Seattle, Washington, U.S.
- Known for: Composition theory and pedagogy
- Spouse: Cami Campbell Pelz (m. 1972)
- Children: 2

Academic background
- Education: Williams College (BA); Exeter College, Oxford (MA); Brandeis University (PhD)
- Thesis: Complex Irony in Chaucer (1969)
- Doctoral advisor: Charles R. Blyth

Academic work
- Institutions: University of Massachusetts, Amherst
- Main interests: Composition studies; English studies; English literature
- Website: University of Massachusetts, Amherst faculty profile

Peter Henry Elbow (April 14, 1935 – February 6, 2025) was an American academic who was a professor of English at the University of Massachusetts Amherst, where he also directed the Writing Program from 1996 until 2000.

As a scholar whose published work raised both academic and popular awareness of scholarship within the field of Rhetoric and Composition, Elbow's research includes theory, practice, and pedagogy. He is one of the pioneers of freewriting.

== Early life and education ==
Peter Henry Elbow was born in New York City on April 14, 1935, one of three children born to C. William and Helen (née Platt) Elbow. He grew up in Fair Lawn, New Jersey, and spent his summers on Martha's Vineyard. In the introduction to the second edition of Writing Without Teachers, Elbow says that his interest in writing practices came from his own difficulty with writing. He attended Proctor Academy and Williams College from 1953 to 1957. While at Exeter College, Oxford University, on scholarship from Williams, he struggled to write the assigned essays, though he ultimately earned his MA. However, when he began his PhD in English at Harvard University, his writing difficulties persisted, causing him to leave in the first year of his studies. Elbow began teaching, first as an instructor at MIT from 1960 to 1963, and then as one of five founding members of Franconia College from 1963 to 1965. It was at Franconia where Elbow discovered he could write more easily when writing for colleagues or students rather than as an assigned piece.

In 1965, Elbow returned to graduate school, this time at Brandeis University. He had to get over beginning by trying to write "well"—that is to write good sentences and work from an outline. He had to learn to write what he liked to call "garbage." He came to accept that he simply couldn't write right; he could only write wrong; and then try by revising to make it right. Elbow has said that the process of freewriting really came about during this time in his life. He would sit down with his typewriter and type out all his thoughts, making writing a sort of therapy. This helped him to write his graduate papers. When it came time to write a dissertation, he spent a year trying to write about metaphor—not metaphor as linguistic decoration but metaphor as thinking. He realized that this would make the process interminable. He settled on Chaucer. He would eventually make his dissertation book-length and publish it in 1975 under the title Oppositions in Chaucer.

== Teaching career ==
After receiving his PhD, Elbow accepted a position at MIT in 1968. While sitting in his office one day in 1970, a representative from Oxford University Press came to show him some books that he might like to use in his classes. When the representative asked Elbow if he was writing anything, Elbow replied that he had thought about trying to write something to do with teacher-less writing groups—a process he had experimented with while teaching courses for Harvard's extension program. Soon after, he had an advance to begin a book called Writing Without Tears, which would later become Writing Without Teachers. In the decades to follow, Elbow wrote more than 10 books and over 100 articles on writing—theory and practice—and the teaching of writing.

== Methods ==
=== Freewriting ===
Freewriting, a term commonly used by Elbow, coined by Ken Macrorie (who called it free writing), is a process of writing without stopping, without editing, without sharing, without worrying about grammar, without thinking, without rushing. Elbow suggests that writers write whatever they want and however they want for 10 to 15 minutes—daily.

Normal freewriting can be adapted to focused freewriting and public freewriting. Focused freewriting involves trying to stay on a topic, which is particularly useful when a writer has a specific assignment to do. Public freewriting is for sharing, which makes it seem a little more risky. But it can be very useful in groups where good trust has built up. The goal is to create language that is more natural and lively, all the while making the writing process easier and more comfortable

=== Criterion- and reader-based feedback ===
Feedback techniques are also among Elbow's practices. These techniques, presented in Writing With Power, are divided into two types: criterion-based and reader-based feedback. Criterion-based feedback judges the writing against standard criteria, such as content, usage, organization, and general effectiveness. Elbow claims this is the kind of feedback that most people are used to giving and receiving. What Elbow says is quite useful about criterion-based feedback is that it allows the writer to reflect on her or his own writing as he goes along. It also allows her or him to recognize common troubles he has in writing so that he can avoid them in the future. In Writing With Power, Elbow gives a catalogue of criterion-based questions. These questions all stem from the following essential questions:

- What is the quality of the content of the writing: the ideas, the perceptions, the point of view?
- How well is the writing organized?
- How effective is the language?
- Are there mistakes or inappropriate choices of usage?.

While criterion-based feedback may seem obvious, it is the inclusion of reader-based feedback that makes this overall method fresh for teachers. Elbow claims that reader-based feedback lets the writer see what thoughts and feelings occur in a reader's mind as he or she is reading the text. Elbow calls this type of feedback "movies of the reader's mind." The list of detailed questions Elbow provides for reader-based feedback follow from the following essential questions:

- What was happening to you, moment by moment, as you were reading the piece of writing?
- Summarize the writing: give your understanding of what it says or what happened in it.
- Make up some images for the writing and the transaction it creates with you.

== Works ==
While Peter Elbow is the author of over 10 books, as well as numerous articles which largely deal with writing theory and practice, few of his works have been as critical to his career as Writing Without Teachers (Oxford UP 1973) and Writing With Power: Techniques for Mastering the Writing Process (Oxford UP 1981).

=== Writing Without Teachers ===
Writing Without Teachers was Elbow's first book about writing, and the one that has made his freewriting technique so popular as a pedagogical practice. His own struggles during his time at Harvard and Oxford inspired the ideas in his first book. In this book, Elbow uses two main metaphors. These are metaphors that reflect Elbow's interest in letting one's ideas develop and change throughout the writing process. The first is to see writing as growing. It must move through stages. The first stage is to generate words before a writer can continue to "grow" a piece of writing and move through the subsequent stages. Elbow argues that writing can be seen as a powerful organic process which develops new knowledge and insight. You "start writing at the very beginning-- before you know your meaning at all-- and encourage your words gradually to change and evolve. Only at the end will you know what you want to say or the words you want to say it with. You should expect yourself to end up somewhere different from where you started. Meaning is not what you start out with but what you end up with. Control, coherence, and knowing your mind are not what you start out with but what you end up with.... Writing is a way to end up thinking something you couldn't have started out thinking. Writing is, in fact, a transaction with words whereby you free yourself from what you presently think, feel, and perceive."

In this section Elbow stresses that it is crucial to write as much as possible because the more a writer writes, not only does he have more to work with, but he also has more to throw away, allowing him to keep moving through the growing stages of writing. The second metaphor is to see writing as cooking, letting ideas simmer and bubble until they are ready to be used. In this metaphor, Elbow emphasizes interaction, particularly between writing and reiteration. According to Elbow, growing is transformation at the macro level, cooking is transformation at the micro level. Essentially, the writing lets his ideas simmer until he can use them to interact with his writing. Elbow suggests that writers spend sufficient time writing as well as stopping completely and reflecting on what the larger picture is meant to present.

Also notable in Writing Without Teachers is Elbow's proposition of the teacher-less writing class, which is the root of today's writing groups. In these teacher-less writing classes, which meet at least once a week, all group members actively participate by contributing a piece of writing and reading each other's work. They discuss it with the goal of getting the writer to see not necessarily what is wrong or right with the piece, but instead what effect the writing has on the readers in the group, as opposed to one teacher's opinion. This is also very similar to Writing Workshops, which are also currently popular pedagogical practices.

=== "The Believing Game" ===
"The Believing Game" is an appendix essay, where Elbow acknowledges the game of believing as a method that he applies to all his work. The essay defines the believing game in comparison to the doubting game – which is also more familiarly known as critical thinking. Elbow feels doubting and believing are two methods needed in order to examine and accept an idea as true.

The appendix to Writing Without Teachers has a section called "The Doubting and Believing Game: An Analysis of the Intellectual Enterprise". Elbow started out simply trying to justify his "no arguing" rule for teacher-less classes, but it developed into what really is the central theoretical foundation underlying all of his work. Elbow argues that Western conceptions of good thinking are based on the doubting game or critical thinking: A process that seeks to use a methodology of skeptical doubting to find flaws in thinking that might look good. Elbow argues that really good thinking also calls on a complementary methodology: conditionally trying to believe all ideas in order to find virtues in thinking that looks wrong. (He is NOT arguing against the doubting game or critical thinking; just asking for an additional methodology.)

Elbow has developed the believing game in a series of essays written throughout his career: "Methodological Doubting and Believing: Contraries in Enquiry", in Embracing Contraries, (Oxford University Press, 1986: 253–300); "Bringing the Rhetoric of Assent and The Believing Game Together—and into the Classroom", College English 67.4 (March 2005): 388–99; "The Believing Game and How to Make Conflicting Opinions More Fruitful", in Nurturing the Peacemakers in Our Students: A Guide to Teaching Peace, Empathy, and Understanding. Chris Weber, editor. Heinemann, 2006, 16–25; "The Believing Game or Methodological Believing", Journal for The Assembly for Expanded Perspectives on Learning 14 Winter 2009: 1–11. His essay "The Uses of Binary Thinking" is also crucial in this theoretical work.

=== Writing With Power ===
Writing With Power was published in 1981 during an era where writing teachers were starting to try to get a sense of what it meant to be a writer teaching writing. During this time, current-traditionalism was quite popular in handbooks for writers (Strunk & White's Elements of Style, for example). This method presented writers with a very cut and dried sense of how to write. With the publication of Writing With Power, Peter Elbow broke the current-traditionalist mold. This book proffers various techniques for writers to try, finding one that best suits them.

This book takes writers through the whole writing process from generating ideas (where freewriting once more makes an appearance) to revising and editing both alone and with others. Elbow goes on to address issues when writing to different kinds of audiences and also how to seek adequate feedback. It seems to be Elbow's goal to show writers that there is more than just one "correct" way to involve oneself in the writing process. If writers learn to interact with their writing in these ways, they have learned to write with power.

== The Elbow and Bartholomae debate ==
In the 1980s and 1990s, Peter Elbow engaged in a public debate with David Bartholomae regarding the role of the writer, as well as that of an academic in undergraduate writing. Bartholomae posits that Elbow "comes down on the side of credulity as the governing idea in the undergraduate writing course," whereas he, himself, expresses more skepticism. The debate continued with these differing views: Elbow believes that writing belongs to the writer from the beginning; Bartholomae counters that he is more dismissive, not necessarily granting the writer her own presence. He believes that Elbow is too accepting while he, himself, thinks that the writer should prove himself first.

In his response, Elbow agrees with Bartholomae that training for academic writing should be a crucial part of an undergraduate's career; however, Elbow says that this training can't be completed in just one semester. Elbow says that perhaps one of their greatest differences is that Bartholomae believes the classroom to be a "'real space, not an idealized utopian space'" (88). This implies to Elbow that Bartholomae believes that "a classroom cannot be utopian, and that utopian spaces are not real spaces" (88).

Another major aspect of the debate comes from the idea of writing without teachers, a concept that Bartholomae states doesn't exist. Elbow cites diaries, letters, stories, poems, and so forth as ways that students write for themselves with no teachers involved. Elbow acknowledges that unequal power, however, is ubiquitous, and not just in writing, but believes that there is still plenty of writing being done for the students' own enjoyment.

The debate has, over the years, helped to shape the study and teaching of composition, especially in regard to how much power is granted to the writer. It has also caused composition pedagogy to consider audience in ways they may not have before. In the end, the two have essentially agreed to disagree, with Bartholomae saying that the writer should have the role of authorship to work towards, and Elbow maintaining that writers be accepted as writers from the beginning.

== Personal life and death ==
After his first marriage ended in divorce, Elbow remarried in 1972, to Cami Campbell Pelz. They had two children. His family described him as an "amateur avid violinist".

Elbow lived in Seattle in the last years of his life, where he died at Virginia Mason Hospital from a gastrointestinal perforation on February 6, 2025, at the age of 89.

== Selected bibliography ==
- Bartholomae, David. "Writing with Teachers: A Conversation with Peter Elbow." College Composition and Communication 46:1 (1995): 62–71.
- Bartholomae, David and Peter Elbow. "Responses to Bartholomae and Elbow." College Composition and Communication 46:1 (1995): 84–92.
- Elbow, Peter. "Being a Writer vs. Being an Academic: A Conflict in Goals." College Composition and Communication 46:1 (1995): 72–83.
- Elbow, Peter. Selected Works of Peter Elbow. March 31, 2009. <http://works.bepress.com/peter_elbow/>.
- Elbow, Peter. Writing Without Teachers. 2nd ed. New York: Oxford UP, 1973,1998.
- Elbow, Peter. Writing With Power: Techniques for Mastering the Writing Process. 2nd ed. New York: Oxford UP, 1981, 1998.
- Elbow, Peter and Pat Belanoff. A Community of Writers: A Workshop Course in Writing. McGraw-Hill, 1989.
- Elbow, Peter and Pat Belanoff. Sharing and Responding. 3rd ed. McGraw Hill, 1999.
- Elbow, Peter. Everyone Can Write. New York: Oxford UP, 2000.
