= Writing across the curriculum =

Writing across the curriculum (WAC) is a movement within contemporary composition studies that concerns itself with writing in classes beyond composition, literature, and other English courses. According to a comprehensive survey performed in 2006–2007, approximately half of American institutes of higher learning have something that can be identified as a WAC program. In 2010, Thaiss and Porter defined WAC as "a program or initiative used to 'assist teachers across disciplines in using student writing as an instructional tool in their teaching'". WAC, then, is a programmatic effort to introduce multiple instructional uses of writing beyond assessment. WAC has also been part of the student-centered pedagogies movement (student-centered learning) seeking to replace teaching via one-way transmission of knowledge from teacher to student with more interactive strategies that enable students to interact with and participate in creating knowledge in the classroom. This page principally concerns itself with WAC in American colleges and universities. WAC has also been important in Britain, but primarily at the K–12 level.

== History of WAC ==
David Russell traces the history of WAC in the United States to the 1870s, the emergence of professional disciplines, and the new need for college-level instruction in writing. Prior to this era, college students were exclusively (for all practical considerations) affluent white men whose natural discourse was identical to the approved discourse of the academy; therefore, their way of speaking and writing was already considered appropriate by and for the academy and composition didn't need to be taught at the college level. Two changes happened to motivate the need for college writing instruction. Firstly, as disciplines (as divisions within academic studies) and contemporary professions specialized, they developed their own specialized discourses. Because these discourses were not merely the same as the everyday discourse of the upper classes, they had to be taught. Secondly, as college students became more diverse – first in terms of social background and, later, in terms of gender, race, and age – not all college students grew up speaking the accepted language of the academy.

First-year composition courses couldn't be about the content of the writing, because content was what the other disciplines taught. Composition, therefore, had to be about the form the writing took and so "writing" was reduced to mechanics and style. Because of this reduced focus and because writing was addressed by composition, other disciplines assumed no responsibility for writing instruction; most students, then, were not taught to write in the context of their specialties. As American education became increasingly skills-oriented following World War II – in part a reaction to the suffusion of universities with war veterans in need of job training, in part a result of modeling education after the efficiency of Fordian factory production – writing instruction was further reduced to a set of skills to be mastered. Once correct (that is, standard academic) grammar, punctuation, spelling, and style were mastered – preferably before reaching the post-secondary level – there was no need for additional writing instruction save as remedial education.

This product-oriented, skills-focused paradigm of writing pedagogy began to change in the 1970s with the popularization of James Britton and colleagues' expressivist school of composition, which said that students benefited from writing as a tool for self-expression and that focusing on technical correctness was damaging. Janet Emig's 1977 article "Writing as a Mode of Learning," grounded in constructivist theories of education, suggested that writing functioned as a unique and invaluable way for students to understand and integrate information. Simultaneously, widespread media attention around college students' apparently decreasing writing proficiency (more a product of the changing demographics of college students than an overt shift in teaching) provoked institutions of higher learning to reevaluate and increase the amount of writing required of students. Carleton College and Beaver College began what were probably the first contemporary WAC programs in 1974 and 1975, respectively, with faculty workshops and writing requirements shared across disciplines.

== Major Theories ==
WAC efforts are usually driven principally by one of two theories: writing to learn or on learning to write in disciplinary discourses, sometimes also called writing in the disciplines. Though both may be used together, one of the two theories generally guides any given writing assignment and, often, any given WAC course.

=== Writing to Learn ===
Writing to learn is also occasionally referred to as the expressionist or cognitive mode of WAC. Writing to learn supports the use of mostly informal, often ungraded writing exercises to help students understand course content in non-English disciplines. Writing to learn assumes that being able to explain or express concepts in one's own words both builds and reflects understanding. Because the goal of writing to learn exercises is learning rather than a finished writing product, instructors are discouraged from paying attention to grammar and surface mechanics. The student himself or herself, not the teacher, is the audience. Common writing to learn exercises include reading responses, journals, free writing, and multiple forms of collaborative writing.

=== Writing to Engage ===
Writing to engage stands between the two most common approaches to writing across the curriculum: writing to learn and writing in the disciplines. Writing to engage involves the use of writing activities and assignments to engage students in the processes and approaches typical of a discipline and, in particular, to employ critical thinking skills typically used in that discipline. The critical thinking skills typically referred to in work on writing to engage draw on the taxonomy of educational objectives in the cognitive domain developed by Benjamin Bloom and his colleagues in the 1950s and later modified by Loren W. Anderson and David R. Krathwohl in the 1990s. Within writing studies, writing has long been viewed as a useful means of demonstrating critical thinking and, through the work of scholars such as Marlene Scardamalia and Carl Bereiter (1987), even as a means of transforming knowledge. Writing to engage takes this view of writing and applies it to WAC.

This category of WAC activities and assignments allows instructors to distinguish between writing-to-learn activities that focus largely on remembering, understanding, and reflecting and writing-to-engage activities that involve applying, analyzing, and evaluating. This focus on critical thinking supports alignment between the curricular goals of a course and instructor expectations about the kinds of work they assign. It also calls instructor attention to the development of the general and disciplinary critical thinking skills students encounter as they progress from lower-division to upper-division courses. Distinguishing between writing to learn and writing to engage can contribute in useful ways to student learning and to preparation for further work in their disciplines.

=== Writing in the Disciplines ===
Writing in the disciplines is also occasionally referred to as the transactional or rhetorical mode of WAC. Writing in the Disciplines (WID) teaches students how to write acceptably in their respective disciplines. Writing in the Disciplines classes teach students to learn to write texts that they will apply in their scholarly and professional lives. Although WID and WAC are correlated, WID emphasizes disciplinary orientation. The students' participation in their majors enlists the students in discourse communities, which are social groups that communicate, at least in part, via written texts and share common goals, values, and writing standards. These writing standards include but are not limited to specialized vocabularies and particular genres.> The goal of WID is to allow students to demonstrate writing skills within the genres expected in academic and professional discourse communities.

Reflection is considered an essential component of critical learning and problem solving, and as such, is indispensable for Writing in the Disciplines. Reflection tasks stimulate students to look back on completed tasks such as writings done in their respective disciplines with the aim to understand their accomplishments and steer future actions. Students are commonly asked to work out these reflections in a writing task. The act of writing itself promotes learning in a particular discipline. They also find writing within a discipline leads students to deploy different productive approaches to learning that they might not have otherwise applied.

Writing in the discipline courses are commonly referred to as Writing Intensive courses (WI). Writing Intensive courses were developed for two reasons: 1) Students' writing skills would decrease if not consistently reinforced. 2) Students' writing improves significantly when they write involving their major. The controversy surrounding WID is who holds responsibility for teaching WID courses. The different models for teaching WID classes are the following: 1) The English (or Writing) department faculty teaches writing courses focused on individual disciplines. 2) English (or Writing) departments and other discipline departments collaborate on instructing writing courses for particular majors. Peterson talks about how English assignments done in the freshman year will carry on and relate to the writing assignments during the rest of ones college career. What is learned in one course can carry on to other courses. This knowledge can be spread by working with colleagues in the same and other departments on assignments and class discussions. By doing this, departments can learn about the similarities and differences they have between them. 3) Individual faculty of respective disciplines teach writing for their respective disciplines. Each university decides which model works best for their institution. For example, The University of San Francisco has implemented model one to teach their Writing in Psychology course(RHET 203). Cornell University has used model two to teach their Technical Writing course(WRIT 7100). The University of Missouri employs the third model to teach their Process Synthesis and Design course - Writing Intensive(CH_ENG 4980W).

==== WID across the Globe ====
The University School of Business Administration (EAN) of Bogotá, Colombia, conducted a study where students took courses for writing in the disciplines. The study showed that writing in the disciplines had positive outcomes on students' performance. Students were split into writing courses based on their majors that would ultimately help them with discipline-specific writing. Courses offered for writing in the discipline included: Introduction to Administration, Principles and Theories of International Business, Economic Thought, Models of Organizational Communication and Foundation in Engineering. Not every major is the same, and there were some differences, the courses offered individual "work guides" for students so that they could focus more in-depth on writing in the discipline. The goal of this study was to help students read and write more critically and analytically.

==== WID in the US ====
The George Washington University located in Washington D.C. has successfully implemented a WID program in their undergraduate education. During students first year, freshman take First Year Writing which teaches students college level research and writing, rhetoric, and more. As students go on, they take two WID courses in different semesters at their time at the university. These courses show their students how to write in their respective disciplines and how to communicate in those disciplines as well. The WID program at this university is implemented at all departments and schools unlike the WID program at The University School of Business Administration (EAN) of Bogotá, Colombia. The University of George Washington had WID in the Arts and Sciences, International Affairs, Public Health, and Engineering and Business schools. The university also has a writing center to further improve their students writing skills. The George Washington University has been in the U.S. News & World Report list for the success they have in their writing program.

Scholars agree that writing enhances learning within a discipline by encouraging students to adopt diverse cognitive approaches. Writing allows students to engage more deeply with their field, refer back to their own work for reinforcement, and develop a stronger mastery of their discipline when introduced early. Studies suggest that meaningful interactions with experts and exposure to discipline-specific reading further improve students' understanding of academic discourse.

Universities have begun initiating academic discourse partnerships between WID programs and writing centers with a focus on inclusivity for diverse student bodies. The goal of this inclusive-based approach to a writing center is for the tutor to guide the students to apply the characteristics of their background to learning and contributing to new discourse communities. Moreover, the inclusive tutoring style acts as an outlet for the student to reconsider their struggles as a normal part of the writing process.

WID in the Workforce

Writing in the disciplines is a valuable skill applicable across various professional fields, including medicine, business, nursing, and accounting. It enables students to establish real-world connections with their chosen field, fostering a deeper understanding of their area of study. Many professionals utilize this skill daily to communicate effectively within their disciplines.

==== Possible Drawbacks of WID ====
One of the possible problems of applying the curriculum may be how different schools define their English/ writing departments. Departments that narrowly focus on only "literary" reading and writing may have some difficulty adapting to a curriculum that contains non-literary subjects (such as organic chemistry). The teachers may lack confidence in their ability to teach such subjects, as they were not the focus within their personal educational career.

Another issue that may arise is the lack of an all-encompassing education within the English department staff. Most literature professionals specialize only in English or literature, but the writing in the disciplines course demands that the teachers must have a very broad field of experience and choosing said curriculum might prove to be difficult. What constitutes a good organic chemistry report may be completely opposite of what a well written literary article constitutes and if a professor chooses a source that is not an accurate representation of the subject, then that particular segment of the course will be moot.

A problem that may affect the students is the case of information overload. Heavy information load can confuse the individual, affect his or her ability to set priorities and make prior information harder to recall. Within a very short amount a time, students are expected to learn how to proficiently write for disciplines all across the board. Because of the very nature of the class, students may find the subject overbearing and difficult to navigate.

Students' writing ability may not actually increase as they progress through upper-division writing classes. Instead, they may simply change their writing style to better fit the criteria of the reader/ teacher. Because of this, students can completely miss the point of WID classes and not learn the nuances between each discipline.

== WAC Structure and Implementation ==
WAC may exist as a formal program housed in or attached to an English department or independent writing program, a formal program as a free-standing unit reporting directly to a dean or vice president, a program attached to an all-campus writing center, or an informal initiative in which faculty voluntarily participate. The WAC director, at most universities, is a tenure-track professor. WAC programs are often administered by a WAC director, frequently with the aid of a WAC faculty committee, and are sometimes staffed by undergraduate or graduate student assistants (also referred to as tutors, consultants, or fellows.)

=== WAC Workshops ===
Workshops at which faculty from many disciplines meet to share ideas about and strategies around writing are a primary way in which WAC is enacted.

Workshops serve multiple functions including:

- Encouraging community amongst faculty interested in WAC
- Allowing WAC faculty (often, but not always from English or composition studies) to share knowledge about writing to learn, writing process, providing student feedback, and other composition scholarship
- Providing a forum for open discussion about writing and teaching
- Giving faculty themselves an opportunity to experiment with different writing strategies including collaborative writing and peer-review and to experience something of how these strategies may feel for their students

A major complaint against the workshop model of WAC is that it can encourage the mindset that writing pedagogy is relatively simple and can be mastered in a few days, whereas using writing effectively (in English or non-English classes) is widely recognized as taking years of practice.

=== WAC in Upper-division Courses ===
On a programmatic level, WAC most often manifests as some kind of writing-intensive (also called writing-enriched or writing-in-the-major) courses. Courses carrying this designation typically meet university-wide criteria including a minimum number of pages or words students write over the semester (or some other measure of writing frequency), opportunity for revision, and deriving a significant portion of the final grade from writing. Writing-intensive courses also often have relatively small enrollment limits (15–35 students depending on institution) and may require faculty to participate in WAC-related professional development activities.

The rationale for writing-intensive coursework includes:

- Writing practice – as with any other skill, students' writing abilities will atrophy if they are left unpracticed; writing-intensive courses ensure that students continue to write after leaving first-year composition
- Writing to learn – contemporary composition theory holds that incorporating active writing promotes student engagement and, therefore, learning
- Professionalization – writing-intensive courses directed at upper-division major students provide an opportunity for students to learn the communication skills expected of professionals in their anticipated fields

=== WAC in First-year Composition ===
While WAC is usually understood as distributing writing across the curriculum in courses outside of English departments, a WAC philosophy can also influence the structure of first-year composition courses. Because first-year composition is often the only writing course students take, the composition of the class can shape students' understanding of what writing is. Incorporating writing from diverse academic genres can therefore expand students' expectations about what constitutes "writing." WAC in first-year composition owes much to genre theory (genre studies) which asks students to think about the classification and rhetorical implications of writing within socially constructed genres.

== Writing-Enriched Curriculum ==
Writing-Enriched Curriculum (or WEC) is a movement that scholars have recently started to implement in university programs across the U.S. With its basic premise reflecting WAC's integration of relevant writing throughout all student's courses, WEC aims to focus on faculty involvement and intense reflection upon devising a writing program that is effective and relevant for students in their various fields of study.

=== Precursors of WEC ===
In the late 1990s, North Carolina State University developed an approach to writing across the curriculum that involved extensive consultation by writing experts with individual departments. These consultations began with a focus on the qualities and characteristics faculty felt that student majors would exhibit if they were strong communicators. Those discussions led to the articulation of learning outcomes for both writing and oral communication. The departments then developed implementation plans that could help them reach the outcomes, followed or preceded by plans for assessing student abilities in order to further refine or project plans for implementation. The Campus Writing and Speaking Program, directed since 1999 by Distinguished Professor Chris Anson (www.ansonica.net), provided much of the support for this campus-wide approach. A few years into the program's existence, Anson and colleague Michael Carter (who is often credited with originating the departmentally-focused conversations on which WEC is founded) consulted with Pamela Flash at the University of Minnesota (where Anson had been a professor for 15 years) to help them spearhead a similar effort. Minnesota evolved the approach into a portable model, shifting from a focus on outcomes-oriented assessment to a faculty-driven, long-term process of sustainable curricular transformation). They branded their model, which is being implemented and adapted by an increasing number of institutions, "WEC."

WEC is both a specific model and a developing concept relating to WAC; the acronym was created by Pamela Flash and her colleagues at The University of Minnesota. Flash is the university's director of Writing Across the Curriculum, founding director of the Writing-Enriched Curriculum and co-director of the writing center. As a pioneer of the WEC writing instruction model, the University of Minnesota has had its faculty enroll up to 5 units of WEC plans per year into the undergraduate curriculum for up to 10 years.

=== The WEC Model ===
According to the WEC website at the University of Minnesota, WEC is a faculty-driven method to ensuring the effective, intentional integration of relevant writing and writing instruction into disciplinary curricula. The WEC model created by Writing Across the Curriculum director Pamela Flash and colleagues and initially implemented by the University of Minnesota involves departmental faculty in developing a locally relevant Writing Plan. The outlining of plans is attempted through collaborative discussions between numerous departmental faculty and specialists in both writing and assessment and the consideration of previous attempts at effective writing instruction. Some of the content under consideration include writing assessments, locally collected data, stakeholder surveys and writing expectations from instructors. The outcome of this meetings is pronounced expectations and plans for relevant instructions to be implemented in the curricula. The next step is the application of the plan into the undergraduate curriculum and assessing Undergraduate Writing Plans. Integrating the WEC model is anticipated to show improvements in writing instruction at a rate that would meet faculty expectations. Each of three writing plans is tested for 1-3 academic years through multiple outlets; internal curricular study and structural changes, material development, writing workshops, seminars, and panels, and additional research. The feasibility of each edition of these writing plans is assessed by a subcommittee of the Faculty Senate; the Campus Writing Board. Contributions to writing plan assessment include triennial panel ratings of student writing against faculty expectations and criteria. The results are then used to guide future writing plans.

Pamela Flash, a key figure in developing the WEC program, stresses the necessity of having the willingness to reflect on the current curriculum and the importance of diverting resistance between faculty members being integral to the Writing-Enriched Curriculum (WEC). This means that WEC essentially challenges the normal standards of writing and the way it is frequently taught. Flash argues that professors need to understand the principles of writing and writing education and to help them understand that undergraduate students and graduate students are not trained in the same writing strategies. When the professor possesses a knowledge of these conceptions the student is more likely to latch onto writing for their respective field of study. For the program itself there are undergraduate writing plans that are designed to graduate and equip students with a writing enriched degree. These plans are formulated by faculty meetings, statistics, curricular maps, and sample writings. The WEC model is based upon reflection and critically analyzing what would enrich the student's writing curricula.

=== The Principles of WAC and the WEC Model ===
Because WEC closely reflects WAC, the principles that Barbara Walvoord gives to devise a WAC program are similar to Anson's Campus Writing and Speaking Program at NC State and Pamela Flash's WEC model at the University of Minnesota. James K. Elmborg's work on information literacy and WAC summarizes Walvoord's characteristics of creating a WAC program as:

- Including colleagues from various disciplines, including teaching assistants and students, as they will all be affected by the WAC program the most.
- Discussing what needs and concerns need to be met with a WAC program and who will be willing to dedicate time to implementing the curriculum.
- What changes will be made to address this—whether it be in school-wide assessments, writing centers or classroom methods
- School administrators will then oversee and facilitate WAC but should not be seen as dictators.

Similarly, both Anson's approach at NC State and Pamela Flash's model at the University of Minnesota reflect the same idea of coming together with faculty members from various fields throughout the curriculum and implementing these changes cohesively. The main point of difference between WAC and WEC, however, is that WEC requires faculty to maintain intentional support activity and assessment of how the program is affecting their students and to make changes, if necessary. Like WAC, Flash's WEC model also requires ongoing implementation and incremental direct and indirect assessment, which allows the faculty-implemented plans to sustain. Anson's program at NC State revisits departments to conduct "profiles" of their efforts, resulting in a formative report for the department's use According to Flash, WEC differs from most WAC programming in its departmental locus and its direct focus on the ways that faculty members in diverse disciplines conceptualize writing and writing instruction.

=== Evolution of the Writing-Enriched Curriculum ===
The process in the development of the Writing-Enriched Curriculum provides a space for equal dialogue between all faculty in all disciplines. WEC is no longer solely dedicated to composition studies and other writing courses, but has expanded toward the Performing Arts curriculum achieving interdepartmental dialogue between all faculty. In turn, WEC now focuses on creating, discovering, and using a language that can be translated into practical, academic, creative and professional fields.

== Criticisms ==
P.A. Ramsay, in his paper Writing across the curriculum: Integrating discourse communities in the academy, found that students that participate in WAC programs become better communicators in their chosen discipline and demonstrated improved critical/analytical thinking.

Disadvantages of WAC include fears that the teaching style will reduce the available time to teach content material, difficulties getting teachers "on board" with the style, as well as fears that the teacher is ill-equipped to teach writing. Ramsay also found while working in Jamaica, that students who were unable to compose in their first language (either because of academic deficiencies or because the language did not have a written language) had difficulties composing in their second language using WAC practices. This was a sentiment echoed by Alexander Friedlander, who in his research found that students unable to write in their first language will have great difficulty writing in their second language regardless of whether their instruction has used WAC strategies.

== See also ==
- AWAC
- The WAC Clearinghouse
