= Academic writing =

Writing resulting from academic work

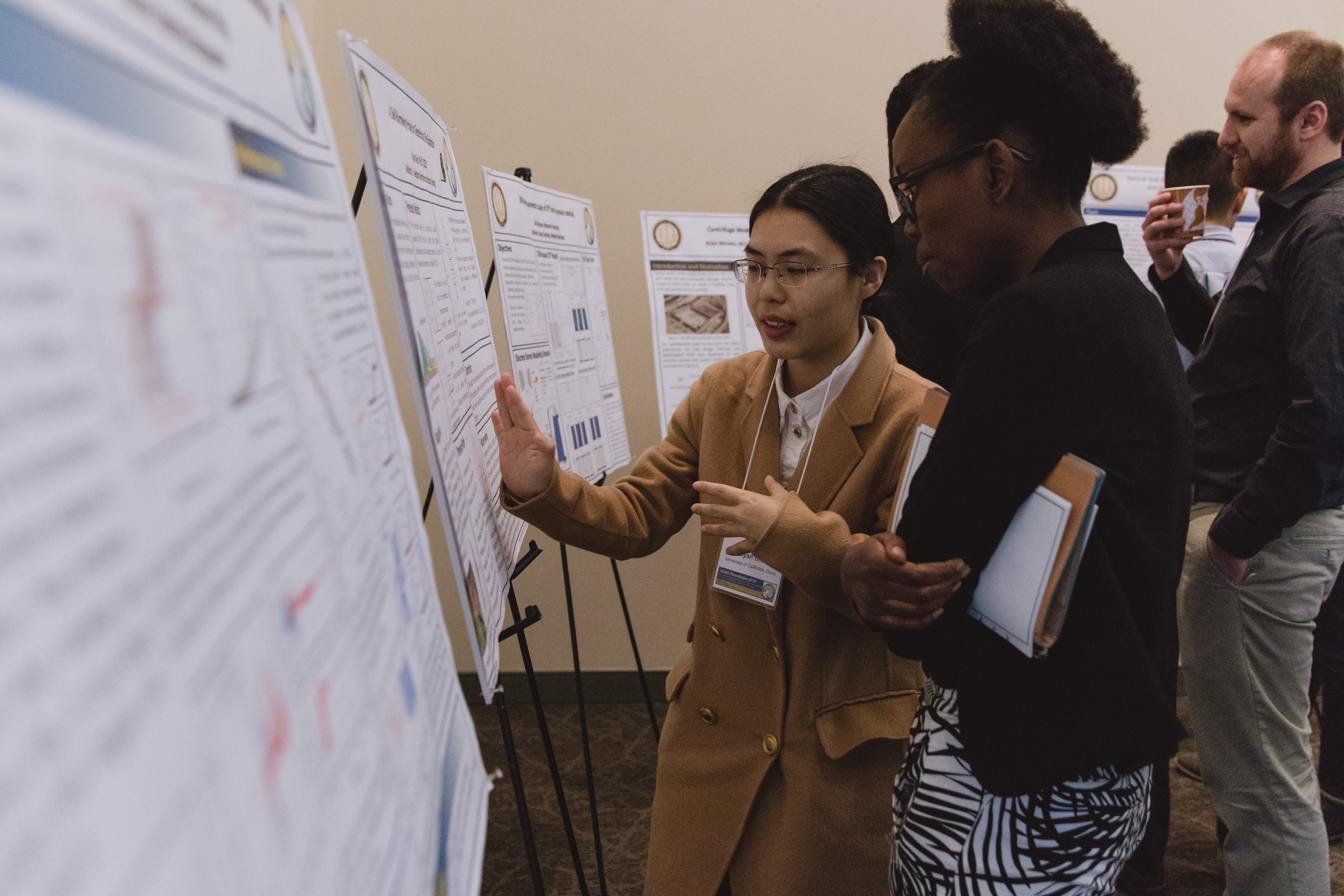
UC Davis geotechnical engineering graduate students discuss research posters, one common genre of academic writing

Academic writing or scholarly writing refers primarily to nonfiction writing that is produced as part of academic work in accordance with the standards of a particular academic subject or discipline, including:

- reports on empirical fieldwork or research in facilities for the natural sciences or social sciences,
- monographs in which scholars analyze culture, propose new theories, or develop interpretations from archives, as well as undergraduate versions of all of these.

Academic writing typically uses a more formal tone and follows certain conventions, such as referencing other academic work and making use of established rhetorical strategies. However, the exact style, content, and organization of academic writing can vary depending on the specific genre and publication method. Despite this variation, all academic writing shares some common features.

Challenges to scholarly writing and strategies to overcome them are systematised by Angelova-Stanimirova and Lambovska in.

== Academic style ==
Academic writing often contains prose register that is conventionally characterized by "evidence...that the writer(s) have been persistent, open-minded and disciplined in the study"; that prioritizes "reason over emotion or sensual perception"; and that imagines a reader who is "coolly rational, reading for information, and intending to formulate a reasoned response."

Three linguistic patterns that correspond to these goals across fields and genres, include the following:

1. a balance of caution and certainty, or a balance of hedging and boosting;
2. explicit cohesion through a range of cohesive ties and moves; and
3. the use of compressed noun phrases, rather than dependent clauses, for adding detail.

The stylistic means of achieving these conventions will differ by academic discipline, seen, for example, in the distinctions between writing in history versus engineering, or writing in physics versus philosophy. Biber and Gray propose further differences in the complexity of academic writing between disciplines, seen, for example, in the distinctions between writing in the humanities versus writing in the sciences. In the humanities, academic style is often seen in elaborated complex texts, while in the sciences, academic style is often seen in highly structured concise texts. These stylistic differences are thought to be related to the types of knowledge and information being communicated in these two broad fields.

One theory that attempts to account for these differences in writing is known as "discourse communities".

=== Criticism ===
Academic style has often been criticized for being too full of jargon and hard to understand by the general public. In 2022, Joelle Renstrom argued that the COVID-19 pandemic has had a negative impact on academic writing and that many scientific articles now "contain more jargon than ever, which encourages misinterpretation, political spin, and a declining public trust in the scientific process."

== Discourse community ==
A discourse community is a group of people that shares mutual interests and beliefs. "It establishes limits and regularities...who may speak, what may be spoken, and how it is to be said; in addition, [rules] prescribe what is true and false, what is reasonable and what foolish, and what is meant and what not."

The concept of a discourse community is vital to academic writers across all disciplines, for the academic writer's purpose is to influence how their community understands its field of study: whether by maintaining, adding to, revising, or contesting what that community regards as "known" or "true." Academic writers have strong incentives to follow conventions established by their community in order for their attempts to influence this community to be legible.

=== Discourse community constraints ===
Constraints are the discourse community's accepted rules and norms of writing that determine what can and cannot be said in a particular field or discipline. They define what constitutes an acceptable argument. Every discourse community expects to see writers construct their arguments using the community's conventional style of language, vocabulary, and sources, which are the building blocks of any argument in that community.

STEM writing often follows strict formats, like the IMRAD structure. This format helps organize ideas clearly and also makes research easier to repeat and check.

=== Writing for a discourse community ===
For writers to become familiar with some of the constraints of the discourse community they are writing for, across most discourse communities, writers must:

- identify the novelty of their position
- make a claim, or thesis
- acknowledge prior work and situate their claim in a disciplinary context
- offer warrants for one's view based on community-specific arguments and procedures

The structure and presentation of arguments can vary based on the discourse community the writer is a part of. For example, a high school student would typically present arguments differently than a college student.

Writing Across the Curriculum (WAC) is an educational program that aims to improve students' writing skills within the context of various disciplinary communities.The Writing Across the Curriculum Clearinghouse provides resources for such programs at all levels of education.

Collaboration between writing centers and STEM faculty help students follow writing rules in their fields. Programs like WATTS train peer tutors to give better feedback on academic papers. These programs focus on writing strategies rather than subject knowledge.

=== Novel argument ===
In a discourse community, academic writers build on the ideas of previous writers to establish their own claims. Successful writers know the importance of conducting research within their community and applying the knowledge gained to their own work. By synthesizing and expanding upon existing ideas, writers are able to make novel contributions to the discourse.

Students improve by analyzing scientific data and solving real-world problems and hence create new ideas. It also helps them connect ideas from different subjects.

== Intertextuality ==
Intertextuality is the combining of past writings into original, new pieces of text. According to Julia Kristeva, all texts are part of a larger network of intertextuality, meaning they are connected to prior texts through various links, such as allusions, repetitions, and direct quotations, whether they are acknowledged or not. Writers (often unwittingly) make use of what has previously been written and thus some degree of borrowing is inevitable. One of the key characteristics of academic writing across disciplines is the use of explicit conventions for acknowledging intertextuality, such as citation and bibliography. The conventions for marking intertextuality vary depending on the discourse community, with examples including MLA, APA, IEEE, and Chicago styles.

Summarizing and integrating other texts in academic writing is often metaphorically described as "entering the conversation," as described by literary theorist Kenneth Burke:

"Imagine that you enter a parlor. You come late. When you arrive, others have long preceded you, and they are engaged in a heated discussion, a discussion too heated for them to pause and tell you exactly what it is about. In fact the discussion had already begun long before any of them got there, so that no one present is qualified to retrace for you all the steps that had gone before. You listen for a while, until you decide that you have caught the tenor of the argument; then you put in your oar. Someone answers; you answer him; another comes to your defense; another aligns himself against you, to either the embarrassment or gratification of your opponent, depending on the quality of your ally's assistance. However, the discussion is interminable. The hour grows late, you must depart, with the discussion still vigorously in progress."

In science writing, writers must connect their work to past research. This keeps their arguments relevant and also shows how ideas grow and change in science.

== Key elements ==
While the need for appropriate references and the avoidance of plagiarism are undisputed in academic and scholarly writing, the appropriate style is still a matter of debate. Some aspects of writing are universally accepted as important, while others are more subjective and open to interpretation.

Style
Contrary to stereotype, published academic research is not particularly syntactically complex; it is instead a fairly low-involvement register characterized by the modification of nominal elements through hedging and refining elaborations, often presented as sequences of objects of prepositions such as what, where, when, and whom.
Logical structure
Writing should be organized in a manner which demonstrates clarity of thought.
Appropriate references
Generally speaking, the range and organization of references illustrate the writer's awareness of the current state of knowledge in the field (including major current disagreements or controversies); typically the expectation is that these references will be formatted in the relevant disciplinary citation system.
Bibliography
Typically, this lists those materials read as background, evidencing wider reading, and will include the sources of individual citations.
Avoidance of plagiarism
Plagiarism, the "wrongful appropriation of another author's language, thoughts, ideas, or expressions", and the representation of them as one's own original work, is considered academic dishonesty, and can lead to severe consequences.

== Academic genres ==
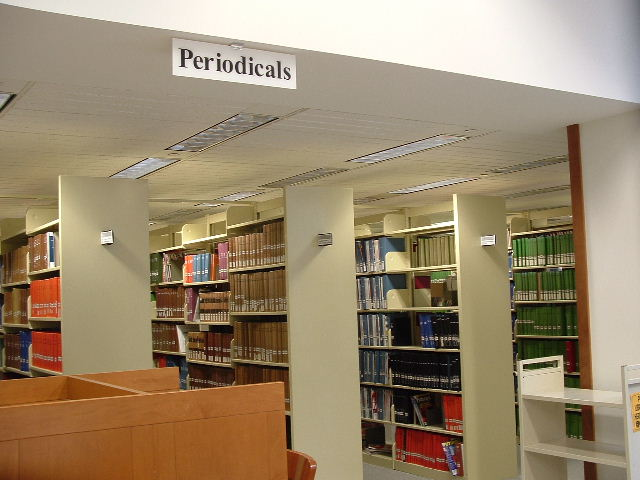
Academic journals collect research articles and are often categorized as "Periodicals" in university libraries. Here, the periodical collection of the Foster Business Library at the University of Washington

Academic writing encompasses many different genres, indicating the many different kinds of authors, audiences and activities engaged in the academy and the variety of kinds of messages sent among various people engaged in the academy. The partial list below indicates the complexity of academic writing and the academic world it is part of.

STEM papers often focus on showing methods and data, but some teachers now ask students to explain their ideas better which helps students write like scientists.

=== By researchers for other researchers ===
- Scholarly monograph, in many types and varieties
- Chapter in an edited volume
- Book review
- Conference paper
- Essay; usually short, between 1,500 and 6,000 words in length
- Explication; usually a short factual note explaining some part of a particular work; e.g. its terminology, dialect, allusions or coded references
- Literature review or review essay; a summary and careful comparison of previous academic work published on a specific topic
- Research article
- Research proposal
- Site description and plan (e.g. in archeology)
- Technical report
- Translation
- Journal article (e.g. History Today); usually presenting a digest of recent research

=== Technical or administrative forms ===
- Brief; short summary, often instructions for a commissioned work
- Peer review report
- Proposal for research or for a book
- White paper; detailed technical specifications and/or performance report

=== Collating the work of others ===
- Anthology; collection, collation, ordering and editing of the work of others
- Catalogue raisonné; the definitive collection of the work of a single artist, in book form
- Collected works; often referred to as the 'critical edition'. The definitive collection of the work of a single writer or poet, in book form, carefully purged of publishers' errors and later forgeries, etc.
- Monograph or exhibition catalog; usually containing exemplary works, and a scholarly essay. Sometime contains new work by a creative writer, responding to the work
- Transcribing, selecting and ordering oral testimony (e.g. oral history recordings)

=== Research and planning ===
- Empirical research
- Experimental plan
- Laboratory report
- Raw data collection plan
- Research proposal, including research questions
- Structured notes

=== Newer forms ===
- Collaborative writing, especially using the internet
- Hypertext, often incorporating new media and multimedia forms within the text
- Performative writing (see also: belles-lettres)

=== By graduate students for their advisors and committees ===
- Doctoral dissertation, completed over a number of years, often in excess of 20,000 words in length
- Masters thesis (in some regions referred to as masters dissertation), often completed within a year and between 6,000 and 20,000 words in length.
- Thesis or dissertation proposal

=== By undergraduate students for their instructors ===
- Research paper; longer essay involving library research, 3000 to 6000 words in length
- Book report
- Exam essays

=== By instructors for students ===
- Exam questions
- Instructional pamphlet, or hand-out, or reading list
- Presentations; usually short, often illustrated
- Syllabus

=== Summaries of knowledge for researchers, students or general public ===
- Annotated bibliography
- Annotated catalogue, often of an individual or group's papers and/or library
- Simplified graphical representation of knowledge; e.g. a map, or refining a display generated from a database. There will often be a 'key' or written work incorporated with the final work
- Creating a timeline or chronological plan. There will often be a 'key' or written work incorporated with the final work
- Devising a classification scheme; e.g. for animals, or newly arisen sub-cultures, or a radically new style of design
- Encyclopedia entry or handbook chapter

=== Disseminating knowledge outside the academy ===
- Call for papers
- Documentary film script or TV script or radio script
- Obituary
- Opinion; an academic may sometimes be asked to give an expert written opinion, for use in a legal case before a court of law
- Newspaper opinion article
- Public speech or lecture
- Review of a book, film, exhibition, event, etc.
- Think-tank pamphlet, position paper, or briefing paper

=== Personal forms often for general public ===
These are acceptable to some academic disciplines, e.g. Cultural studies, Fine art, Feminist studies, Queer theory, Literary studies

- Artist's book or chapbook
- Autobiography
- Belles-lettres; stylish or aesthetic writing on serious subjects, often with reference to one's personal experience
- Commonplace book
- Diary or weblog
- Memoire; usually a short work, giving one's own memories of a famous person or event
- Notebooks

== Emotions in higher-education academic writing ==
Participating in higher education writing can entail high stakes. For instance, one's GPA may be influenced by writing performance in a class and the consequent grade received, potentially stirring negative emotions such as confusion and anxiety. Research on emotions and writing indicates that there is a relationship between writing identity and displaying emotions within an academic atmosphere. Instructors cannot simply read off one's identity and determine how it should be formatted. The structure of higher education, particularly within universities, is in a state of continual evolution, shaping and developing student writing identities. Nevertheless, this dynamic can lead to a positive contribution to one's academic writing identity in higher education. Unfortunately, higher education does not value mistakes, which makes it difficult for students to discover an academic identity. This can lead to a lack of confidence when submitting assignments. A student must learn to be confident enough to adapt and refine previous writing styles to succeed.

Academic writing can be seen as stressful, uninteresting, and difficult. When placed in the university setting, these emotions can contribute to student dropout. However, academic writing development can prevent fear and anxiety from developing if self-efficacy is high and anxiety is low. External factors can also prevent enjoyment in academic writing including finding time and space to complete assignments. Studies have shown core members of a "community of practice" concerning writing reports are more of a positive experience than those who do not. Overall emotions, lack of confidence, and prescriptive notions about what an academic writing identity should resemble can hinder a student's ability to succeed.

Confidence in writing helps students do better. It can improve student performance. Programs that include feedback and teamwork can reduce writing anxiety and help students feel more comfortable writing. The Research Refinery Model is a postgraduate writing intervention designed to help students develop term papers into journal manuscripts. It includes critical appraisal of published research, instruction on publication conventions, peer review, and methodology development. In a study of the model, postgraduate students reported increased writing confidence and greater awareness of publication conventions.

Research has shown the students frequently find difficulty in transferring general writing skills to discipline-specific contexts.

== Format ==
A commonly recognized format for presenting original research in the social and applied sciences is known as IMRD, an initialism that refers to the usual ordering of subsections:

- Introduction (Overview of relevant research and objective of current study)
- Method (Assumptions, questions, procedures described in replicable or at least reproducible detail)
- Results (Presentation of findings; often includes visual displays of quantitative data charts, plots)

and

- Discussion (Analysis, Implications, Suggested next steps)

Standalone methods sections are atypical in presenting research in the humanities; other common formats in the applied and social sciences are IMRAD (which offers an "Analysis" section separate from the implications presented in the "Discussion" section) and IRDM (found in some engineering subdisciplines, which features Methods at the end of the document).

Other common sections in academic documents are:

- Abstract
- Acknowledgments
- Indices
- Bibliography
- List of references
- Appendix/Addendum, any addition to a document

== See also ==
- Academic authorship
- Academic ghostwriting
- Academic journal
- Academic publishing
- Author editing
- Creative class
- Criticism
- Expository writing
- Knowledge worker
- Persuasive writing or rhetoric
- Publishing
- Research paper mill
- Rhetorical device
- Scientific writing
- Scientific publishing
- Scholarly method
- Scholarly skywriting
- Style guide

== Bibliography ==
- Baldo, Shannon. "Elves and Extremism: the use of Fantasy in the Radical Environmentalist Movement." Young Scholars in Writing: Undergraduate Research in Writing and Rhetoric 7 (Spring 2010): 108–15. Print.
- Greene, Stuart. "Argument as Conversation: The Role of Inquiry in Writing a Researched Argument." n. page. Print.
- Kantz, Margaret. "Helping Students Use Textual Sources Persuasively." College English 52.1 (1990): 74–91. Print.
- Porter, James. "Intertextuality and the Discourse Community."Rhetoric Review. 5.1 (1986): 34–47. Print.
