= 1906–07 Rugby Union County Championship =

English rugby union competition

1906–07 County Championship
- Countries: England
- Champions: Tied; Devon (4th title); Durham (5th title)

The 1906–07 Rugby Union County Championship was the 19th edition of England's premier rugby union club competition at the time.

Devon and Durham won the competition after being declared joint champions following two drawn matches. It was Durham's fifth success and Devon's fourth. It was Durham's eighth consecutive final appearance. In the final S P Start scored an injury time try for Devon to force a replay.

== Final ==
13 April 1907

Durham	3–3	Devon
Try: Duthie		Try: Start

Victoria Park (Hartlepool)
Referee: A. O. Jones (Midland Counties)

D Ellwood	Hartlepool Rovers
W E Heal	Hartlepool Rovers
E M Harrison	Durham City
Jack Taylor (capt)	West Hartlepool
Fred Chapman	Westoe
Jimmy Sivewright	Hartlepool Rovers
J Thompson	Hartlepool Rovers
Frank Boylen	Hartlepool Rovers
George Carter	Hartlepool Rovers
Tom Hogarth	Hartlepool Rovers
S Brittain	Hartlepool Rovers
George Summerscale	Durham City
Jimmy Duthie	West Hartlepool
J Phillips	Durham City
Harry Havelock	West Hartlepool

F Lillicrap	Devonport Albion
C. Harvey	Devonport Albion
D F Moir	United Services
A. C. G. de Smidt	Plymouth
Sydney Start	R.N.E College, Dartmouth
Raphael Jago	Devonport Albion
James Peters	Plymouth
Ernest Roberts (capt)	R.N.E College, Dartmouth
T. S. Kelly	London Devonians
Geoffrey Roberts	Exeter
George Dobbs	Devonport Albion
Samuel Williams	Devonport Albion
F W Bulkely	Devonport Albion
William Mills	Devonport Albion
J Cummings	Devonport Albion

== Final replay ==
20 April 1907

Devon	0-0 (HT 0-0)	Durham

Exeter
Referee: A. O. Jones (Midland Counties)

F Lillicrap	Devonport Albion
Rev. C. W. Moore	Exeter
D F Moir	United Services
A. C. G. de Smidt	Plymouth
Sydney Start	R.N.E College, Dartmouth
Raphael Jago	Devonport Albion
James Peters	Plymouth
Ernest Roberts (capt)	R.N.E College, Dartmouth
T. S. Kelly	London Devonians
Geoffrey Roberts	Exeter
George Dobbs	Devonport Albion
Samuel Williams	Devonport Albion
J Mallett	Newton Abbot
William Mills	Devonport Albion
F Knight	Plymouth

D Ellwood	Hartlepool Rovers
W E Heal	Hartlepool Rovers
E M Harrison	Durham City
Jack Taylor (capt)	West Hartlepool
Fred Chapman	Westoe
Jimmy Sivewright	Hartlepool Rovers
J Thompson	Hartlepool Rovers
Frank Boylen	Hartlepool Rovers
George Carter	Hartlepool Rovers
Tom Hogarth	Hartlepool Rovers
S Brittain	Hartlepool Rovers
George Summerscale	Durham City
J Phillips	Durham City
Jimmy Duthie	West Hartlepool
Harry Havelock	West Hartlepool

== See also ==
- English rugby union system
- Rugby union in England
