= 1905–06 Rugby Union County Championship =

Rugby club championship game

1905–06 County Championship
- Countries: England
- Champions: Devon (3rd title)
- Runners-up: Durham

The 1905–06 Rugby Union County Championship was the 18th edition of England's premier rugby union club competition at the time.

Devon won the championship for the third time, defeating Durham in the final. This match marked Durham's seventh consecutive final appearance, Adamson was carried off and taken to hospital leaving Durham with just fourteen players for the majority of the game.

== Final ==
10 March 1906

| Devon | 16–3 | Durham |
| Try: Hosking, Odam, Kelly (2); Con: Peters, Lillicrap | | Try: Boylen |

Exeter
Attendance: 12,000
Referee: E. B. Holmes (Midland Counties)

| F Lillicrap | Devonport Albion |
| C. Hosking | Devonport Albion |
| Lieutenant de Smidt | Plymouth |
| A. J. R. Roberts | Exeter |
| J Odam | Exeter |
| Raphael Jago | Devonport Albion |
| James Peters | Plymouth |
| Ernest Roberts (capt) | R.N.E College, Dartmouth |
| Samuel Williams | Devonport Albion |
| T. S. Kelly | Exeter |
| William Mills | Devonport Albion |
| Lieutenant George Dobbs | Devonport Albion |
| George Northmore | Cardiff |
| G. Lark | Torquay Athletic |
| L. H. Smith | R.N.E College, Dartmouth |

| N C Neilson | Sunderland |
| Jack Wass | West Hartlepool |
| Jack Taylor (capt) | West Hartlepool |
| Charlie Adamson | Durham City |
| Henry Imrie | Durham City |
| Jimmy Sivewright | Hartlepool Rovers |
| H Wallace | West Hartlepool |
| Frank Boylen | Hartlepool Rovers |
| George Carter | Hartlepool Rovers |
| Tom Hogarth | Hartlepool Rovers |
| J. Elliott | Durham City |
| M Hall | Westoe |
| Jimmy Duthie | West Hartlepool |
| C J Stock | Sunderland |
| Harry Havelock | Hartlepool Old Boys |

== See also ==
- English rugby union system
- Rugby union in England
