= 1904–05 Rugby Union County Championship =

English rugby union competition

1904–05 County Championship
- Countries: England
- Champions: Durham (4th title)
- Runners-up: Middlesex

The 1904–05 Rugby Union County Championship was the 17th edition of England's premier rugby union club competition at the time.

Durham won the competition for the fourth time defeating Middlesex in the final.

== Final ==
29 April 1905

Durham	9–8	Middlesex
Try: Imrie, Hogarth, Elliott		Try: Williams; Con: Alexander

Victoria Park (Hartlepool)

A Neilson	Sunderland
B Wellock	West Hartlepool
Jack Taylor (capt)	West Hartlepool
C Adamson	Durham City
Henry Imrie	Durham City
Thompson	West Hartlepool
H Wallace	West Hartlepool
George Summerscale	Durham City
J Elliott	Durham City
George Carter	Hartlepool Rovers
Tom Hogarth	Hartlepool Rovers
Frank Boylen	Hartlepool Rovers
G Havelock	Hartlepool Old Boys
C J Stock	Sunderland
M Hall	Westoe

E M Harrison	Blackheath
H Hosken	Ley's School, Cambridge
W Bailey	Cymrio Wanderers
Reginald Godfray	Richmond
J J Louwrens	St Mary's Hospital
Adrian Stoop	Oxford University
Albert Wade	London Scottish
Curly Hammond (capt)	Harlequins
R O C Ward	Harlequins
B Owen	St Bartholomews's Hospital
Jack Williams	London Welsh
Harry Alexander	Richmond
F T Turner	Richmond
N H Dakeyne	Richmond
W B Grandage	St Bartholomews's Hospital

== See also ==
- English rugby union system
- Rugby union in England
