= Harry Havelock =

Harry Havelock may refer to:

- Harry Havelock (footballer) (1901–1973), English footballer
- Harry Havelock (rugby union) (1879–1923), English international rugby union player
