= Sketch (drawing) =

Quickly executed freehand drawing

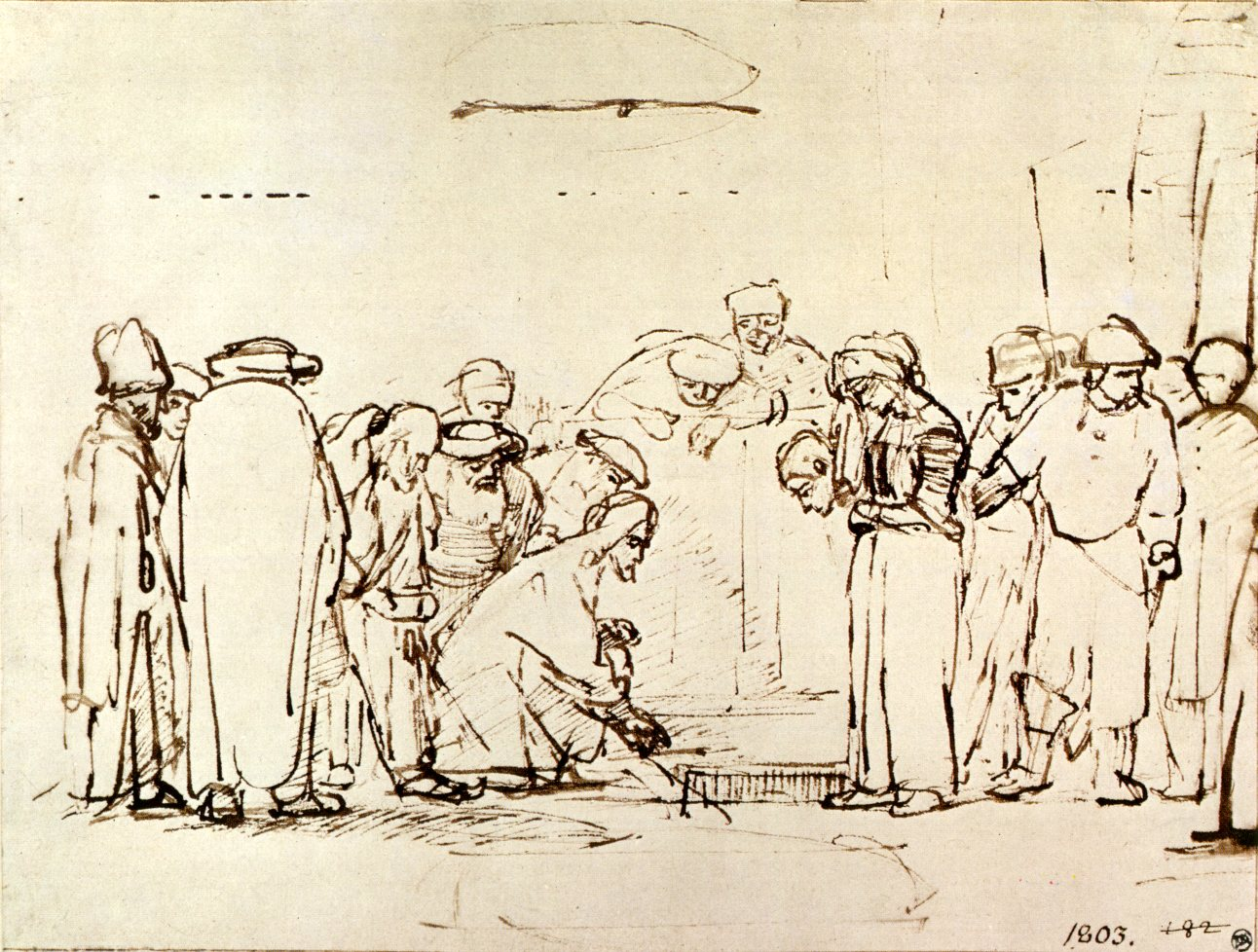
Jesus and the Adulteress, a sketched figure composition by Rembrandt

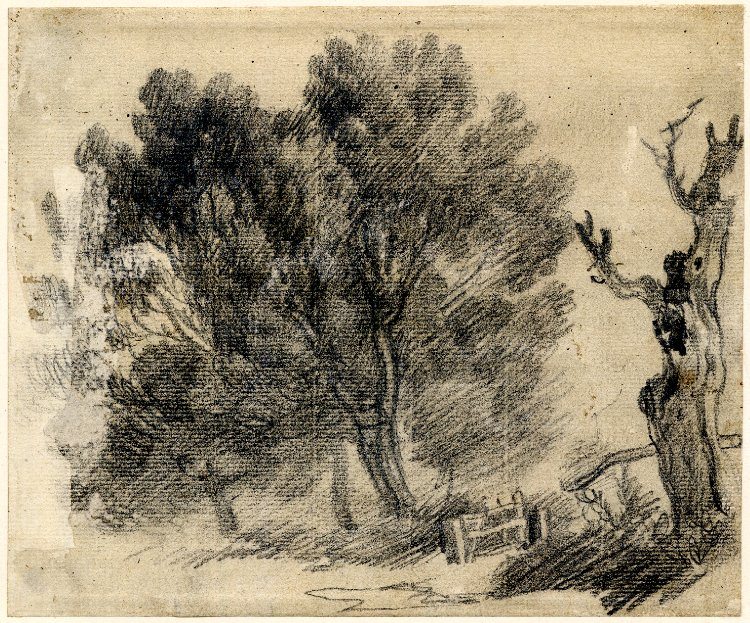
Charcoal sketch of willows by Thomas Gainsborough

Sketch of Khaki Roberts by Laura Knight

A sketch (ultimately from Greek σχέδιος – schedios, "done extempore") is a rapidly executed freehand drawing that is not usually intended as a finished work. A sketch may serve a number of purposes: it might record something that the artist sees, it might record or develop an idea for later use or it might be used as a quick way of graphically demonstrating an image, idea or principle. Sketching is the most inexpensive art medium.

Sketches can be made in any drawing medium. The term is most often applied to graphic work executed in a dry medium such as silverpoint, graphite, pencil, charcoal or pastel. It may also apply to drawings executed in pen and ink, digital input such as a digital pen, ballpoint pen, marker pen, water colour and oil paint. The latter two are generally referred to as "water colour sketches" and "oil sketches". A sculptor might model three-dimensional sketches in clay, plasticine or wax.

== Methods ==
The two methods in sketching are line drawing and shading.

=== Line art ===
A line drawing is the most direct means of expression. This type of drawing without shading or lightness, is usually the first to be attempted by an artist. It may be somewhat limited in effect, yet it conveys dimension, movement, structure and mood; it can also suggest texture to some extent.

=== Shading ===
"Line gives character, but shading gives depth and value – it is like adding an extra dimension to your sketch."

== Advanced techniques ==
=== Pencil painting ===
When the pencil is handled almost as if it was a brush, resulting a paintlike quality, then the technique is called Pencil Painting.

=== Wash and benzine ===
Starting with a pencil drawing first, then washing over the pencil areas with a sable haired water color brush dipping it into the benzine is called wash and benzine. Benzene does not itself add color, but merely modifies the shaded pencil areas.

== Uses ==
Sketching is generally a prescribed part of the studies of art students. This generally includes making sketches (croquis) from a live model whose pose changes every few minutes. A "sketch" usually implies a quick and loosely drawn work, while related terms such as study, modello and "preparatory drawing" usually refer to more finished and careful works to be used as a basis for a final work, often in a different medium, but the distinction is imprecise. Underdrawing is drawing underneath the final work, which may sometimes still be visible, or can be viewed by modern scientific methods such as X-rays.

Most visual artists use, to a greater or lesser degree, the sketch as a method of recording or working out ideas. The sketchbooks of some individual artists have become very well known, including those of Leonardo da Vinci and Edgar Degas which have become art objects in their own right, with many pages showing finished studies as well as sketches. The term "sketchbook" refers to a book of blank paper on which an artist can draw (or has already drawn) sketches. The book might be purchased bound or might comprise loose leaves of sketches assembled or bound together.

Sketching is also used as a form of communication in areas of product design such as industrial design. It can be used to communicate design intent and is most widely used in ideation. It can be used to map out floor plans of homes.

The ability to quickly record impressions through sketching has found varied purposes in today's culture. Courtroom sketches record scenes and individuals in law courts. Sketches drawn to help authorities find or identify wanted people are called composite sketches. Street artists in popular tourist areas sketch portraits within minutes.

== Gallery ==
Subjects, styles and media

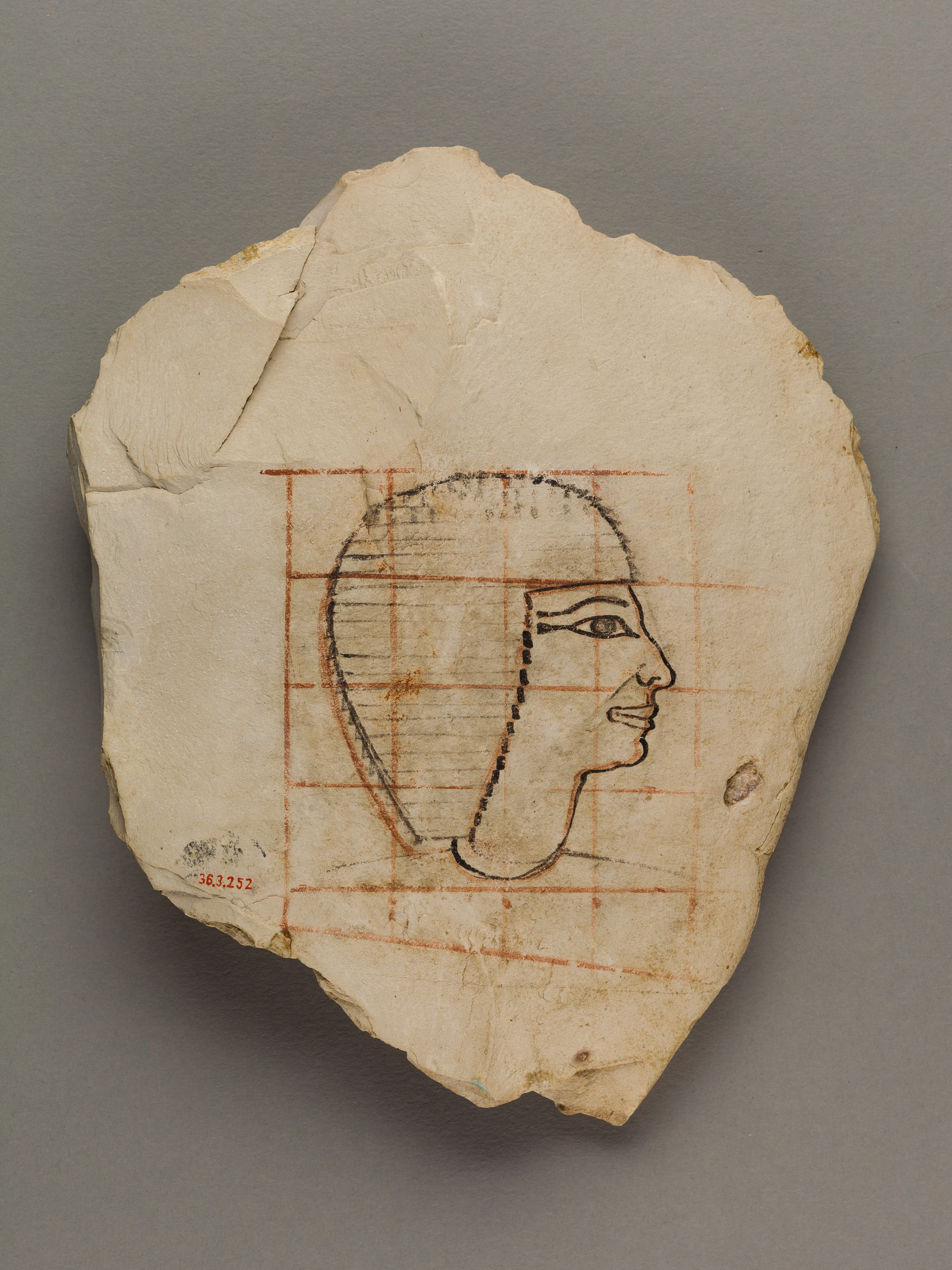
An ostracon showing a gridded sketch thought to depict the royal official Senenmut, Thebes, c. 1479–1458 B.C.E

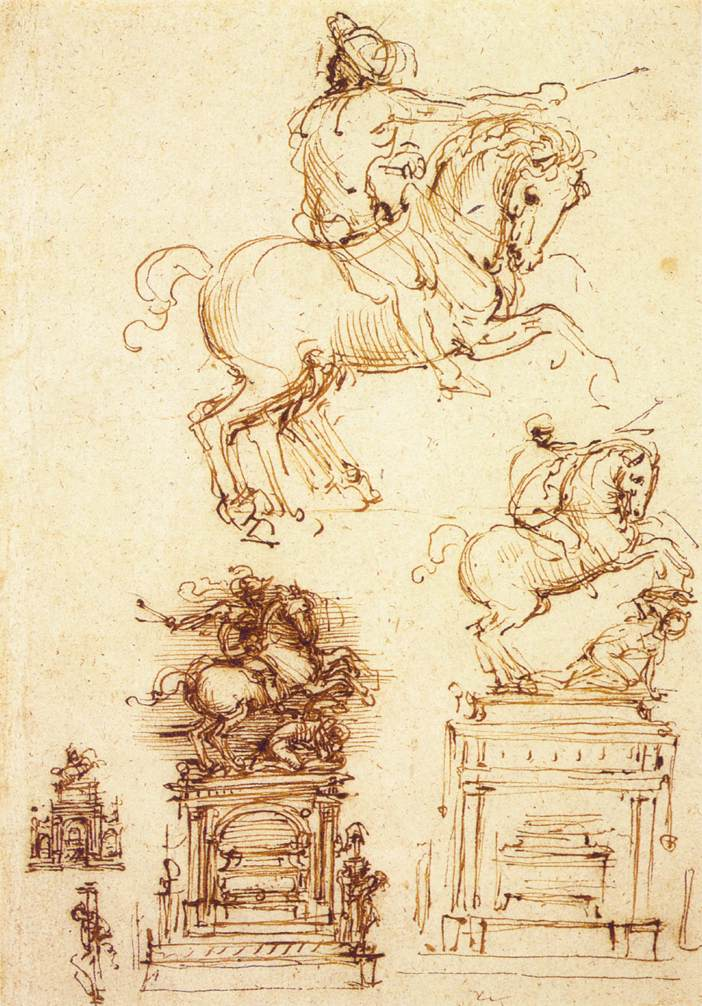
Three draft sketches in sepia for an equestrian monument, Leonardo da Vinci 1508–10

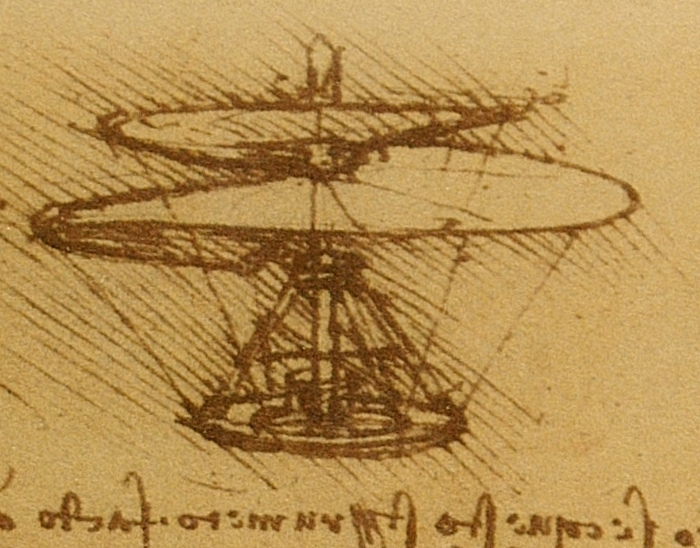
Sketch in pen and ink of an idea for a flying machine with a spiral rotor, Leonardo da Vinci

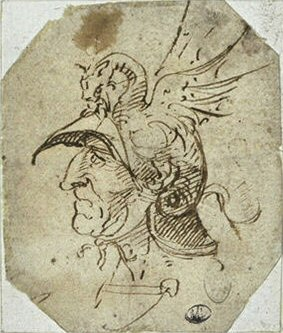
Sketch of a head in a parade helmet, Michelangelo, c. 1500

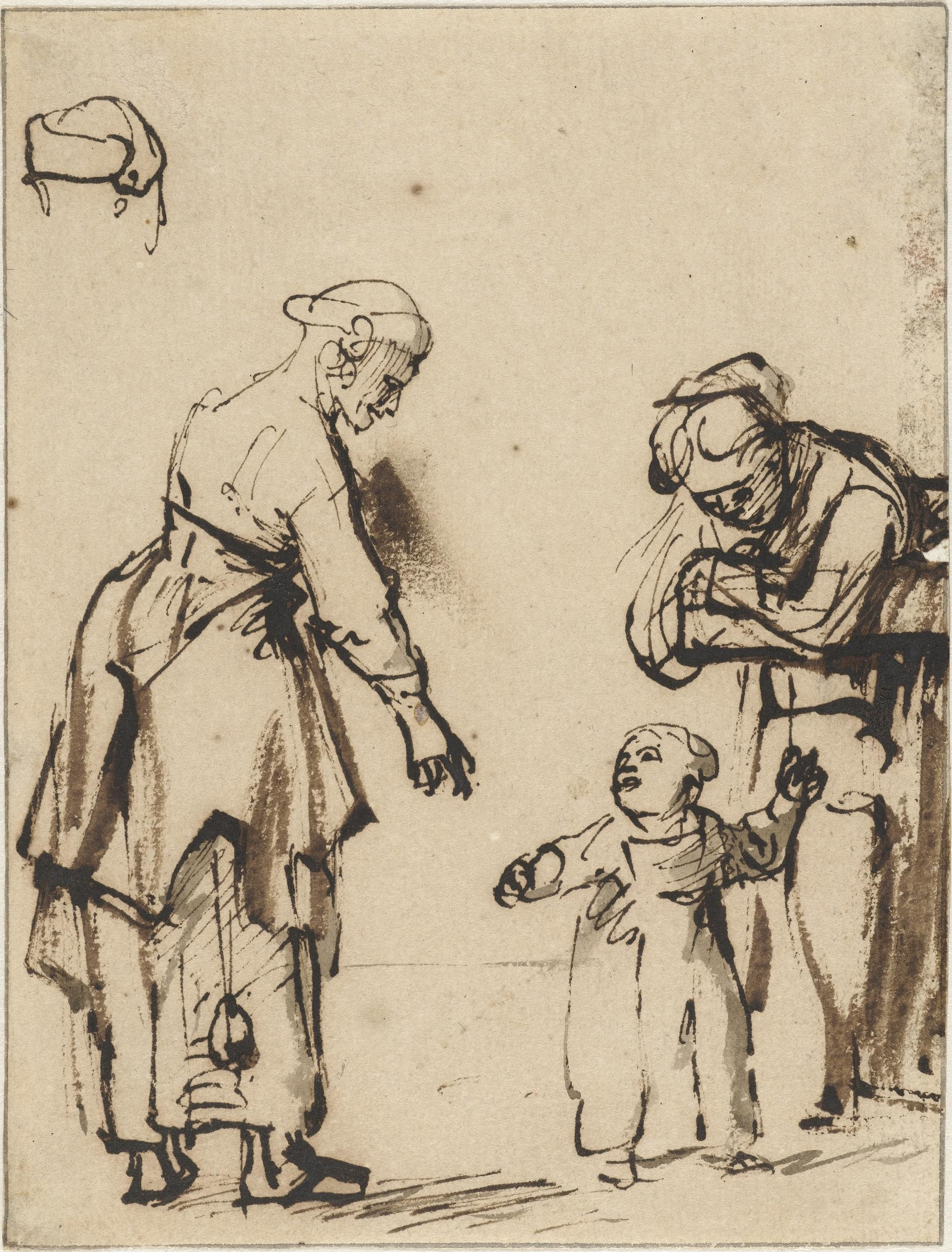
Figure sketch in ink of two women teaching a baby to walk, Carel Fabritius, c. 1640

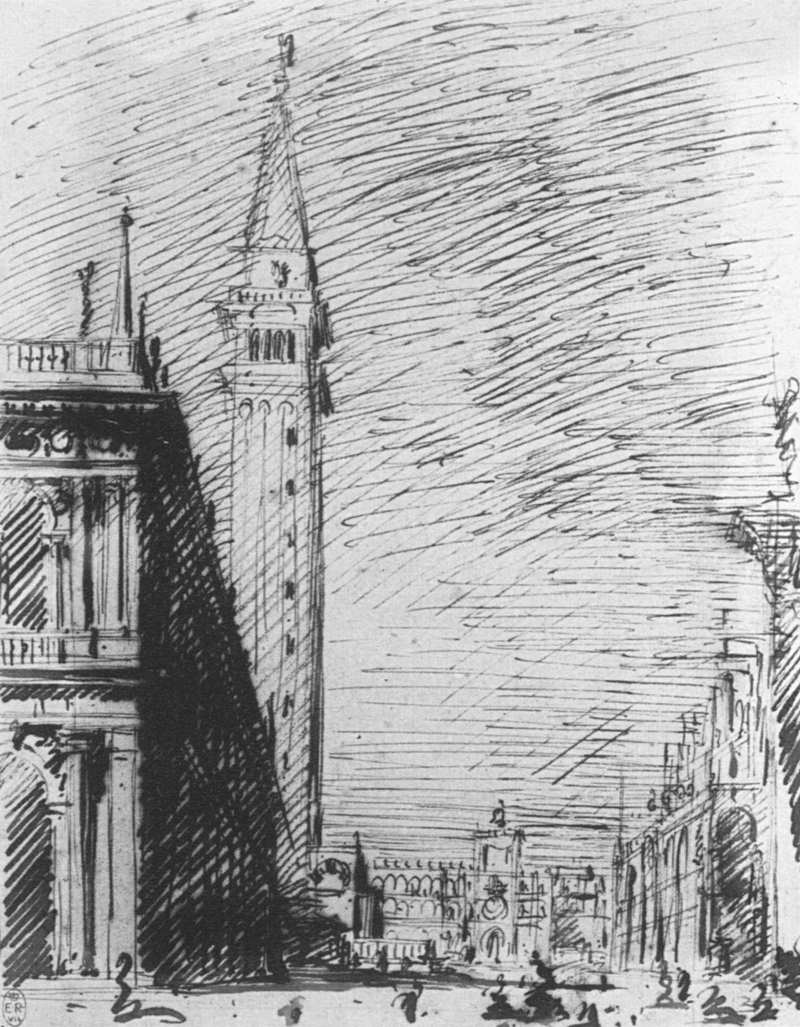
Sketch in pencil and ink of the Piazetta, Venice, Canaletto, c. 1730

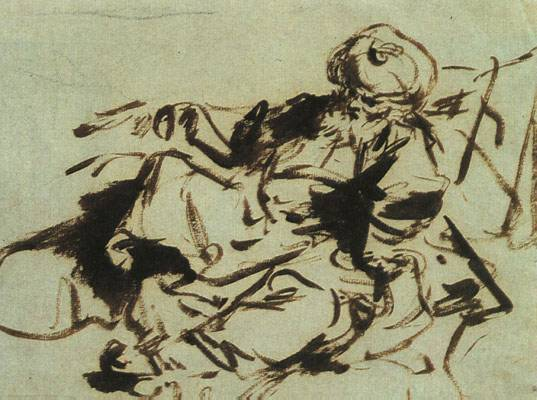
The Pasha, an ink sketch by Jean-Honoré Fragonard, late 1700s

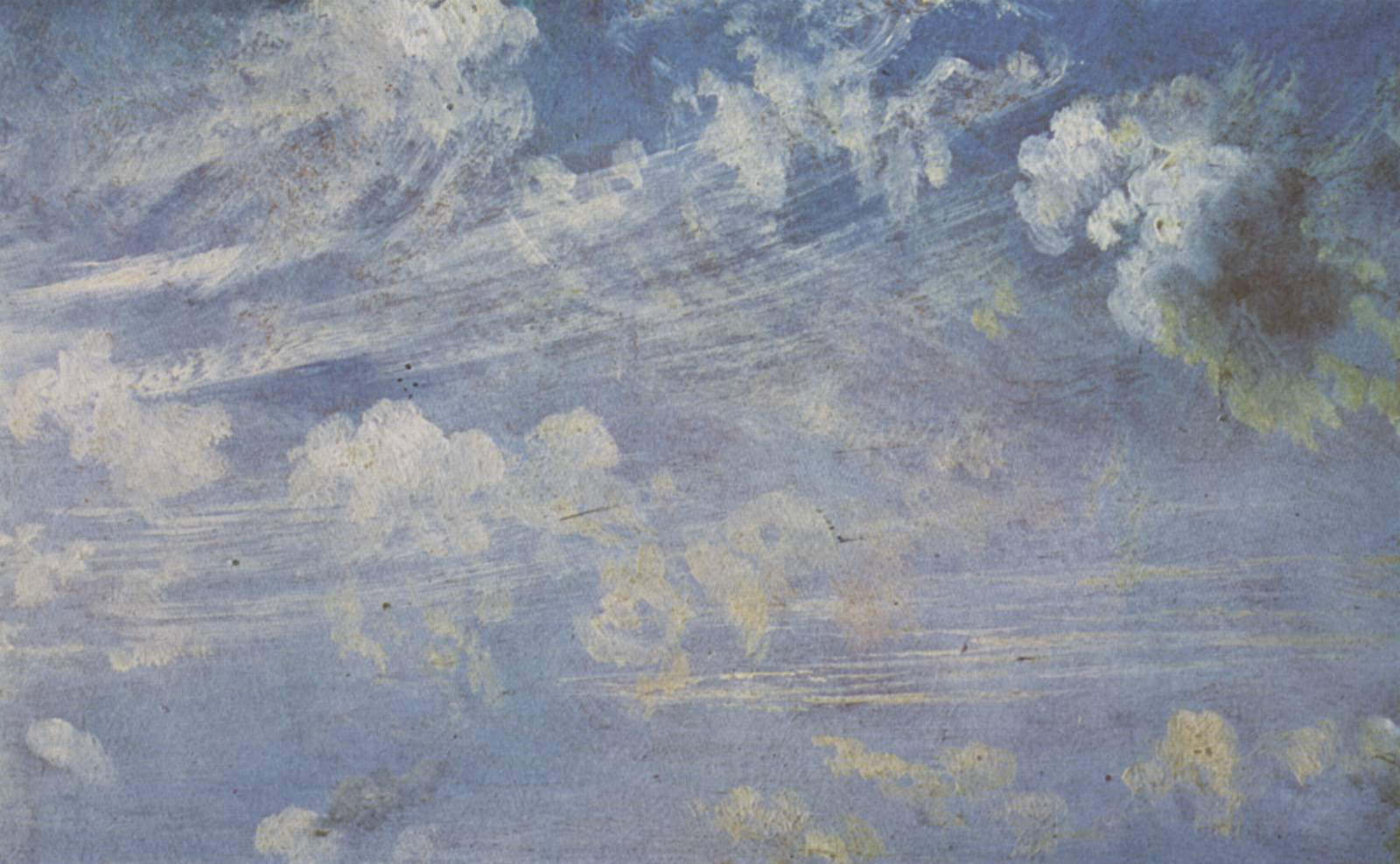
An oil sketch of clouds by John Constable, 1821–22

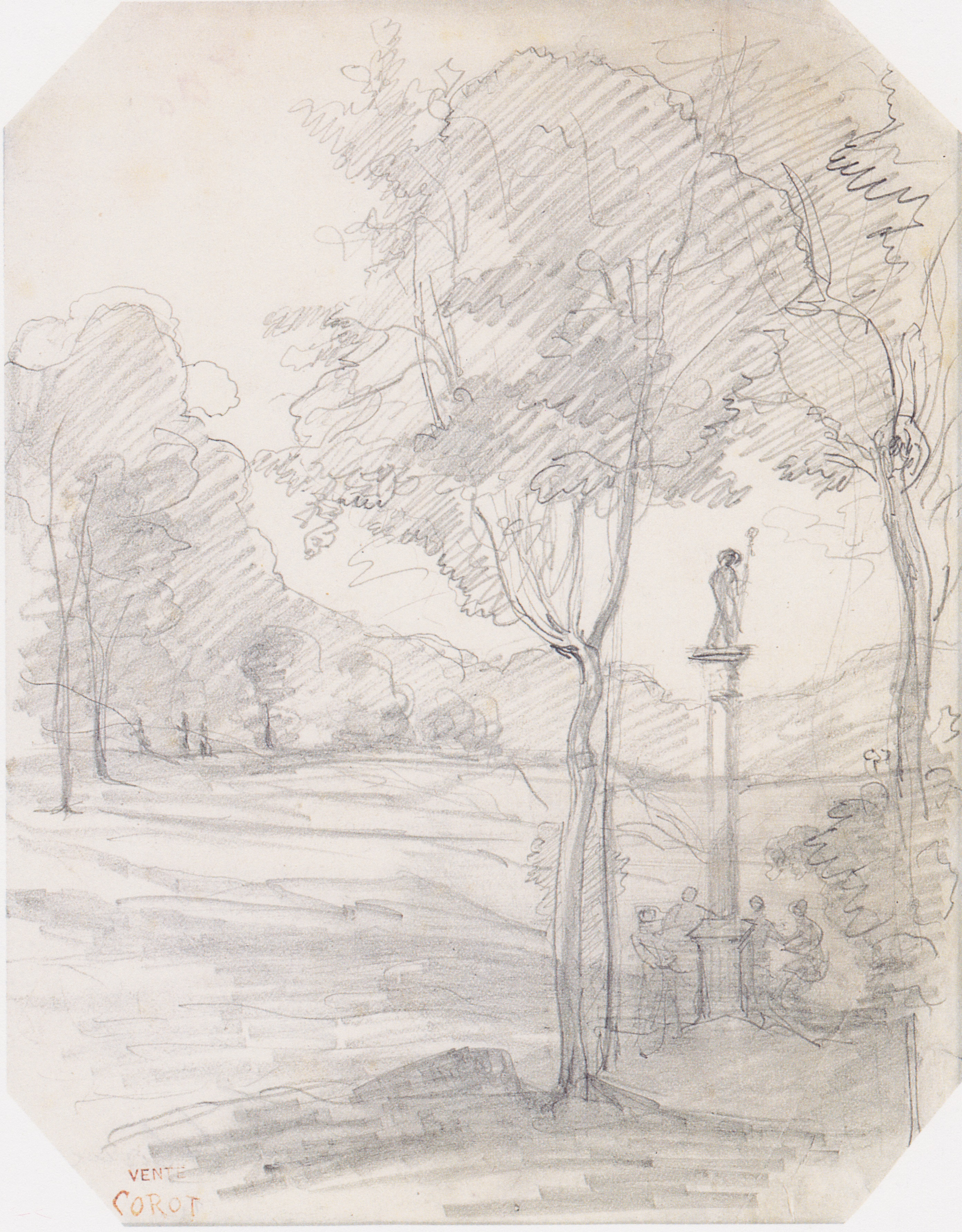
A sketch of a landscape in pencil by Camille Corot, 1870

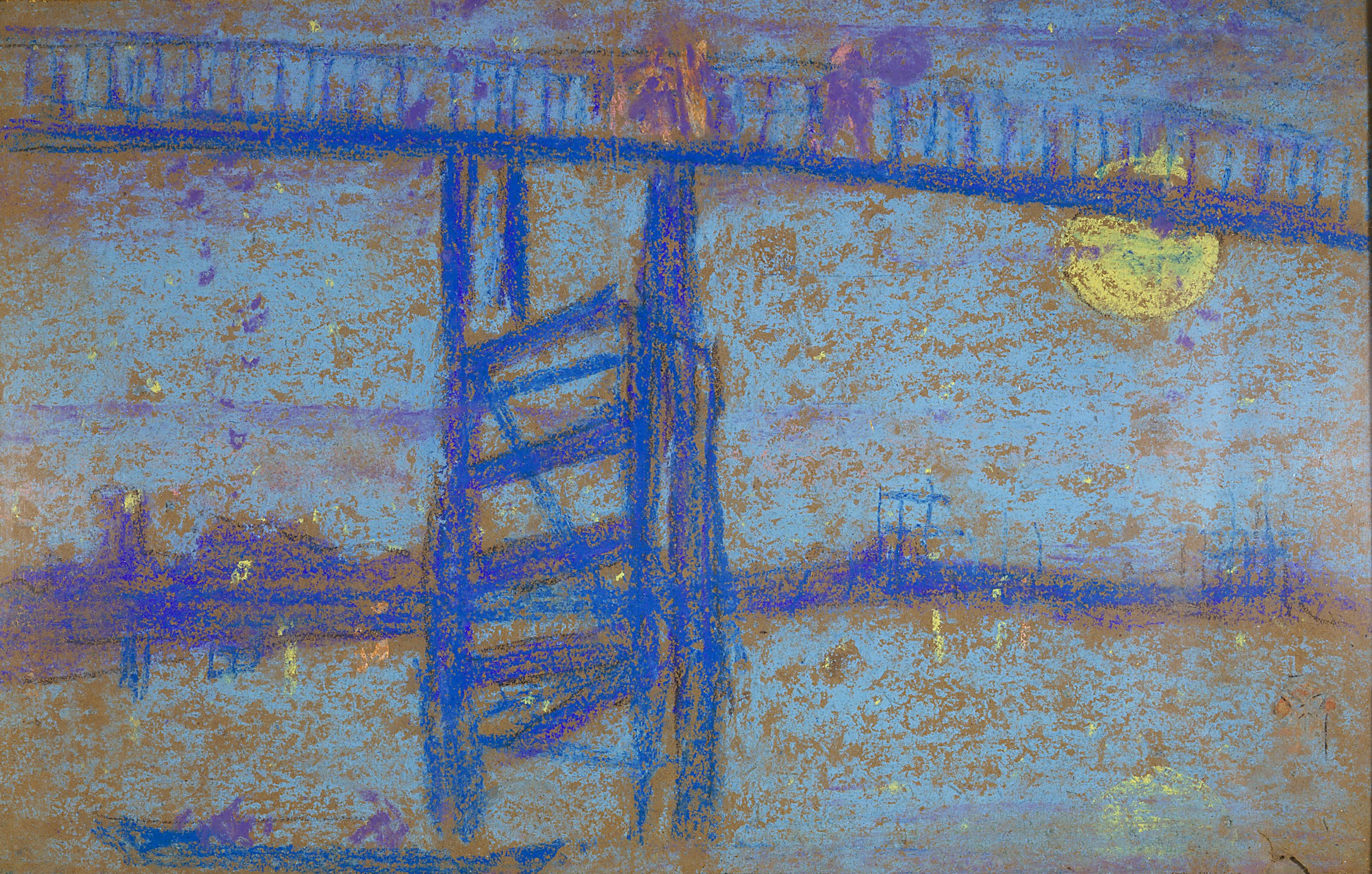
Nocturene-Battersea Bridge, a pastel sketch by Whistler, 1872

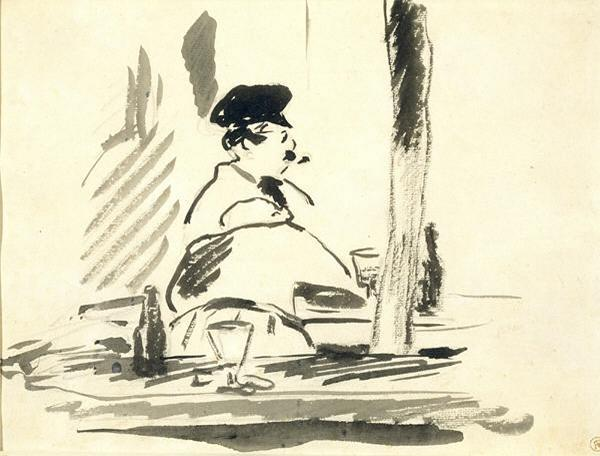
Le Bouchon, a brush and ink sketch by Édouard Manet, 1878

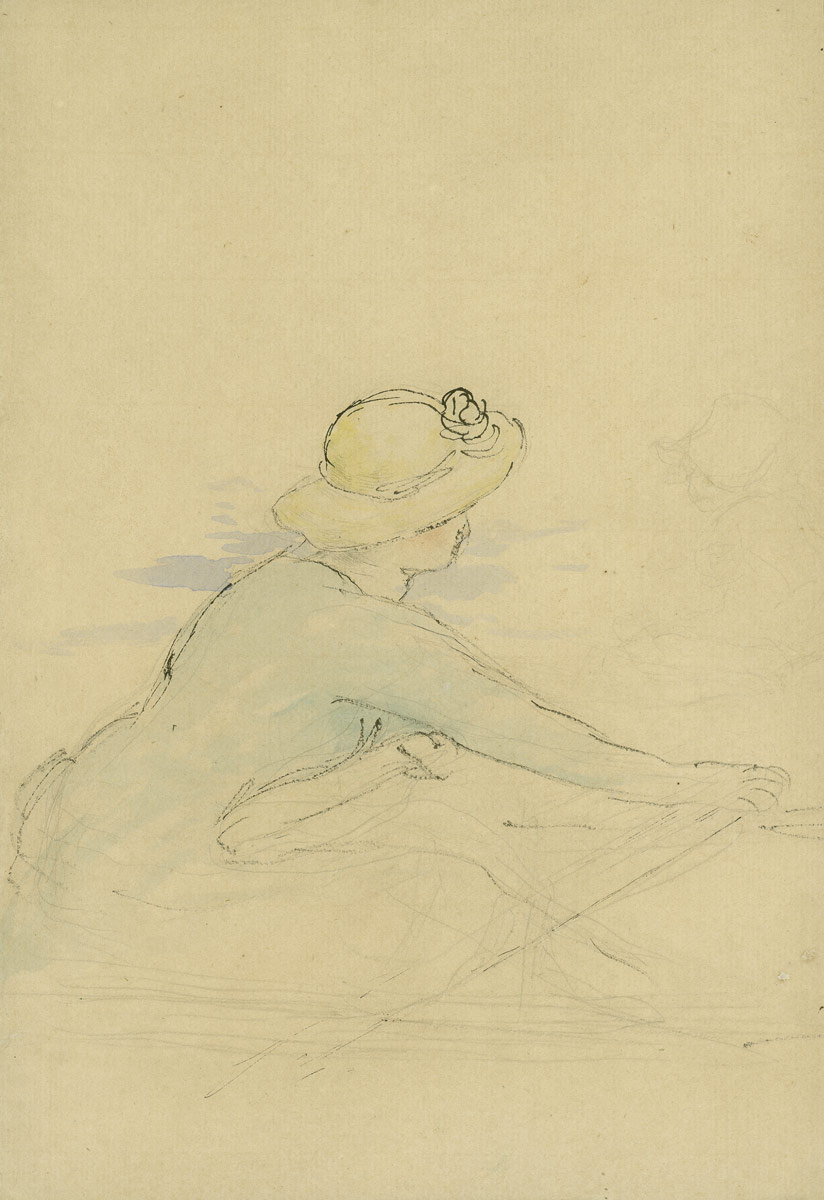
A girl in a rowing boat, pencil, ink and watercolour, Pierre-Auguste Renoir, 1870s

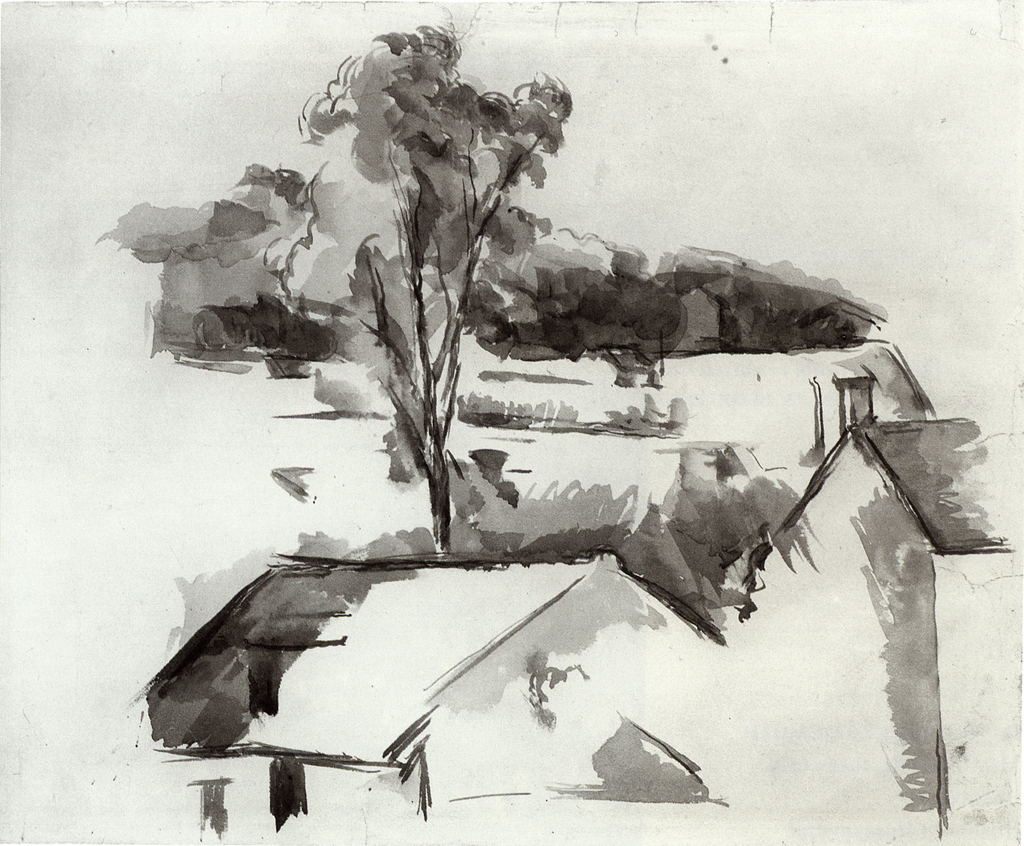
A landscape sketch in brush and ink with washes, Paul Cézanne, 1888–90

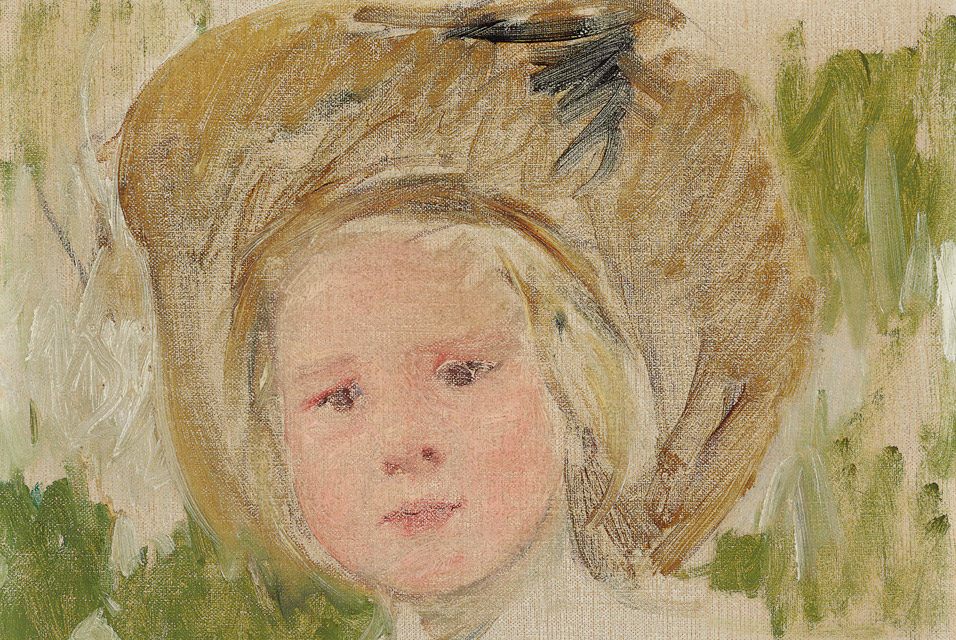
Oil sketch Child in a hat with a black rosette, Mary Cassatt, c. 1910

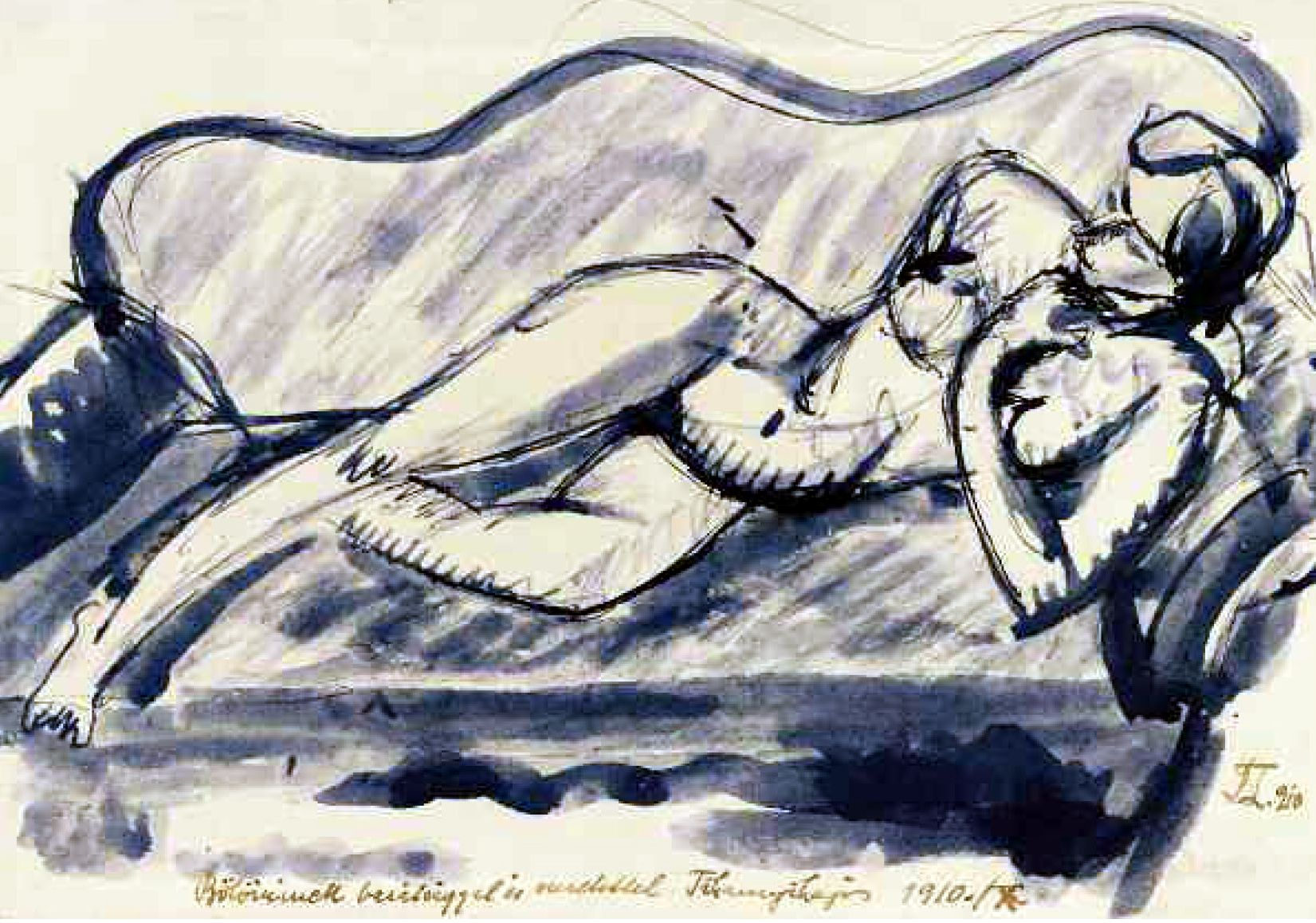
Sketch of a reclining nude in brush and ink washes, Lajos Tihanyi, 1910

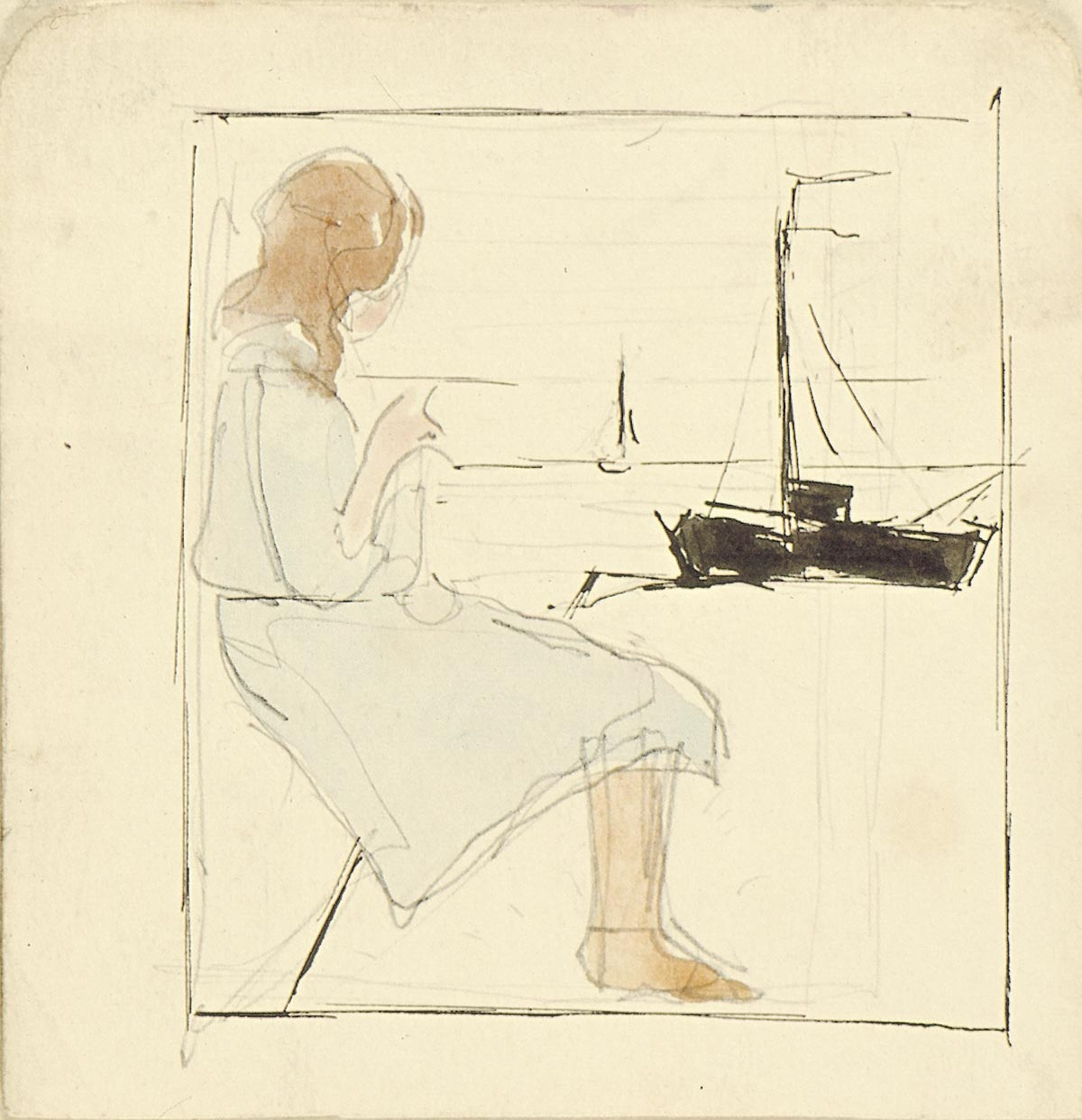
Girl Knitting by the Sea, pencil and watercolour by Theo van Doesburg, 1918

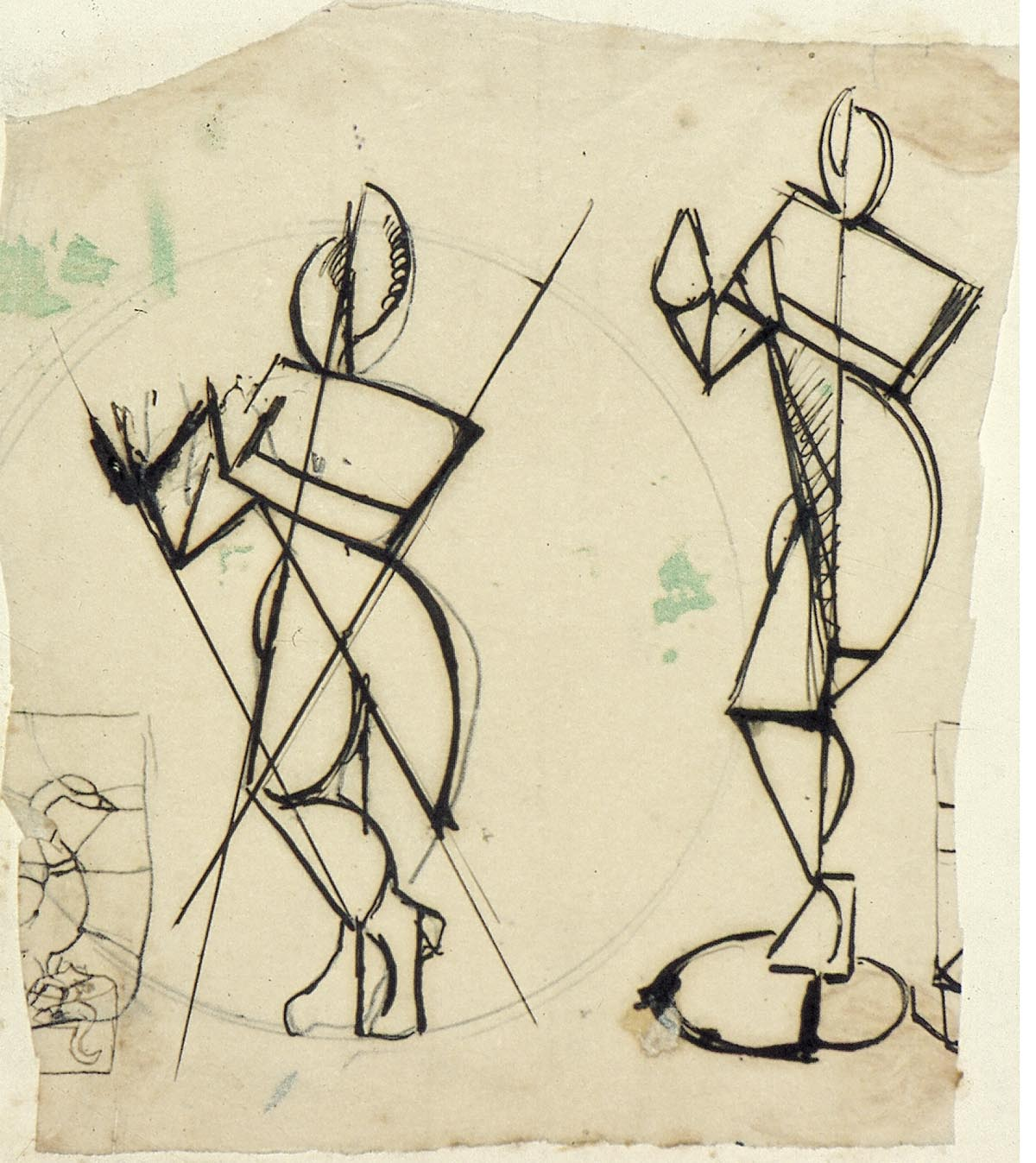
Two ink sketches of Krishna playing the Flute, van Doesburg, early 20th century

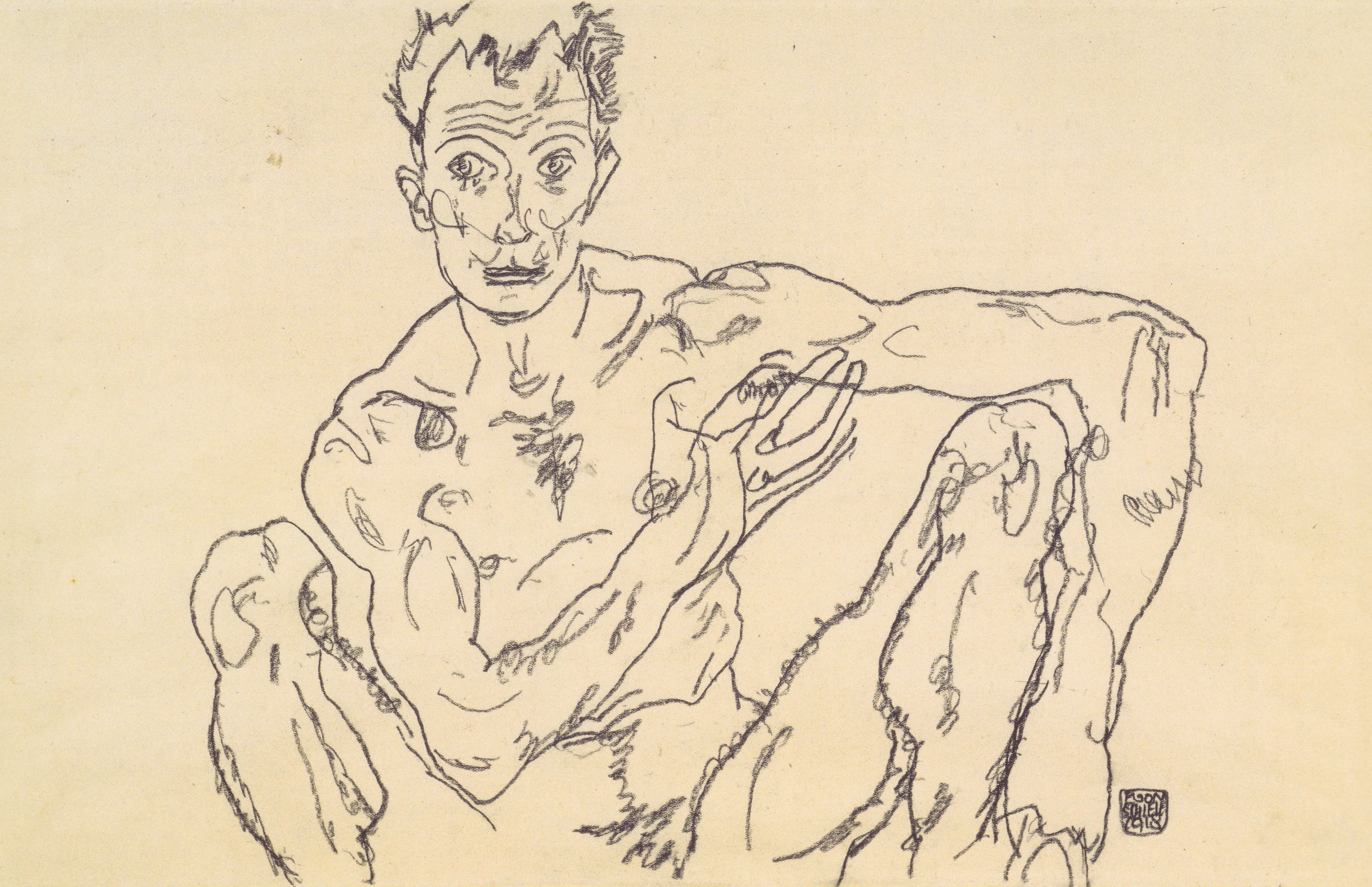
Sketch of a male nude in black crayon, Egon Schiele, 1918

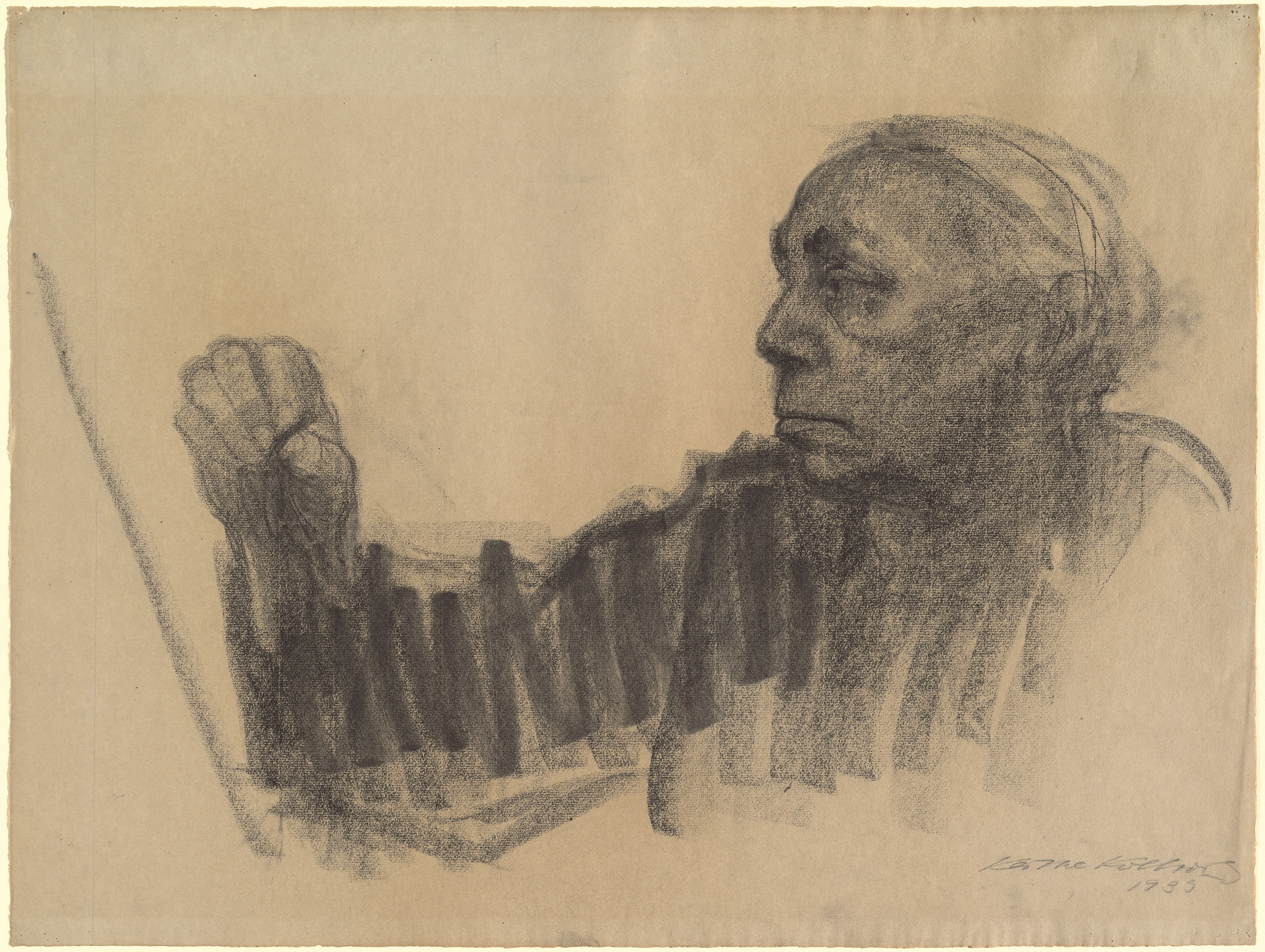
Kathe Kollwitz, "Self Portrait", charcoal on brown laid Ingres paper, 1933

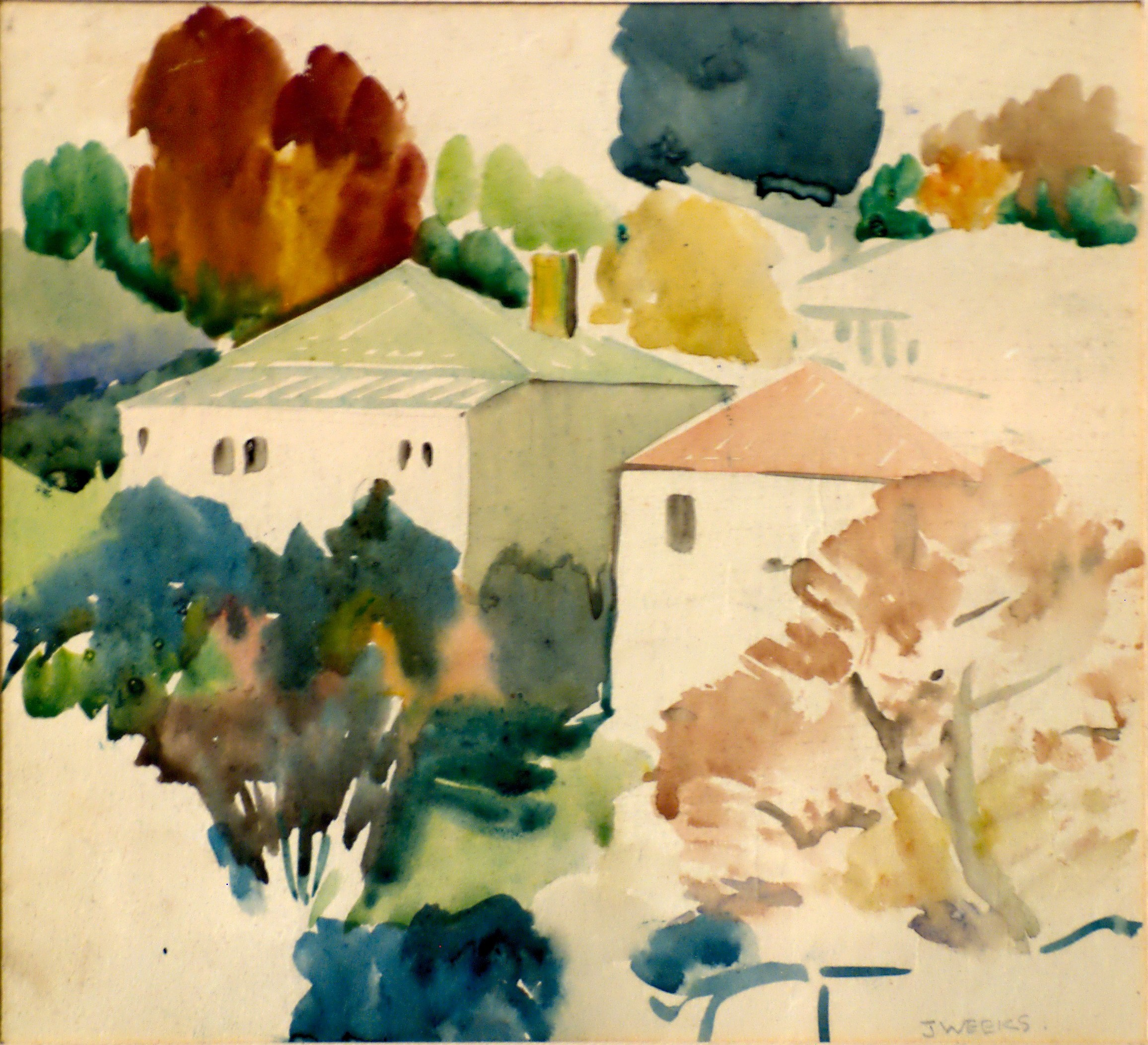
Watercolour landscape sketch, John Weeks, c. 1950

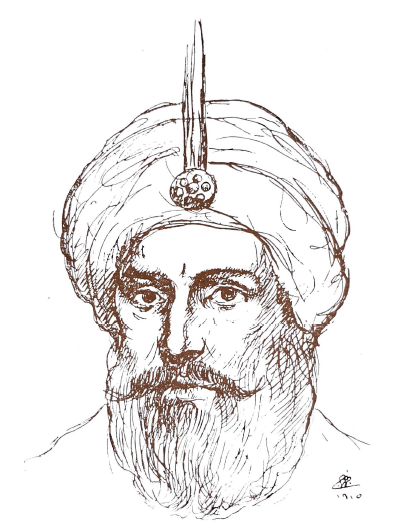
Sketch of Harun al-Rashid by Kahlil Gibran (1883–1931)

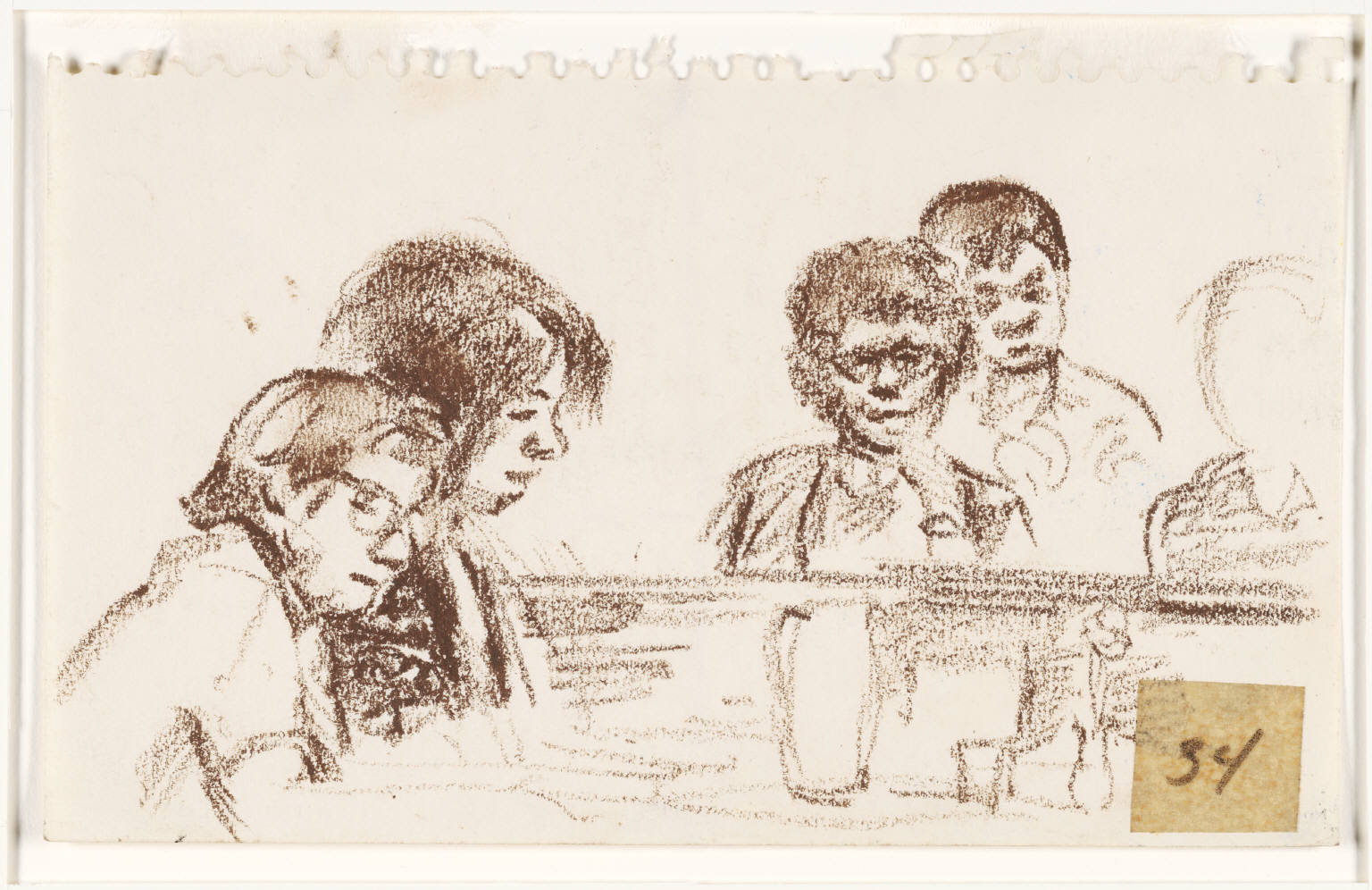
Court sketch from the New Haven Black Panther trials, Robert Templeton, 1971

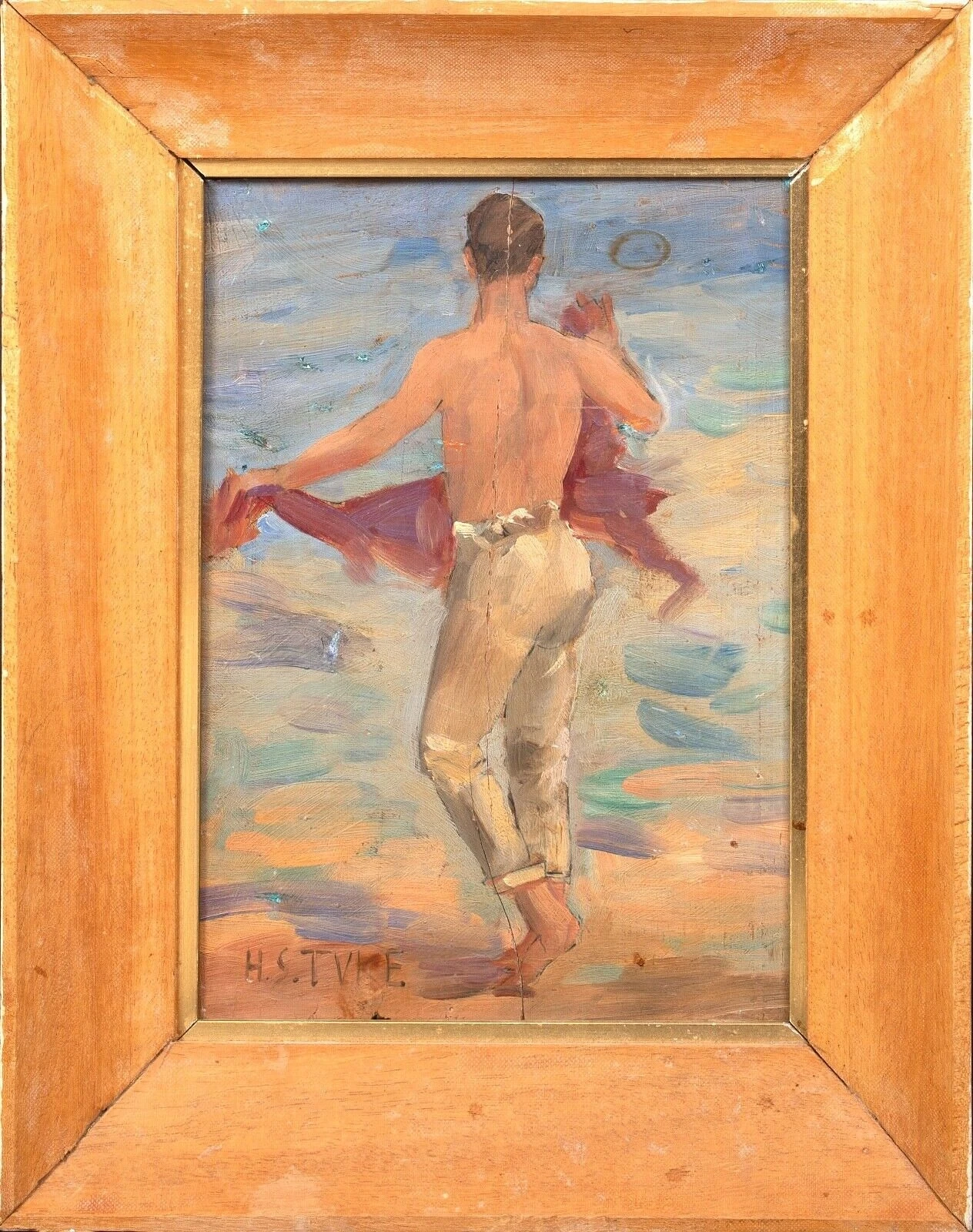
Sketch by Henry Scott Tuke for his painting Gleaming waters

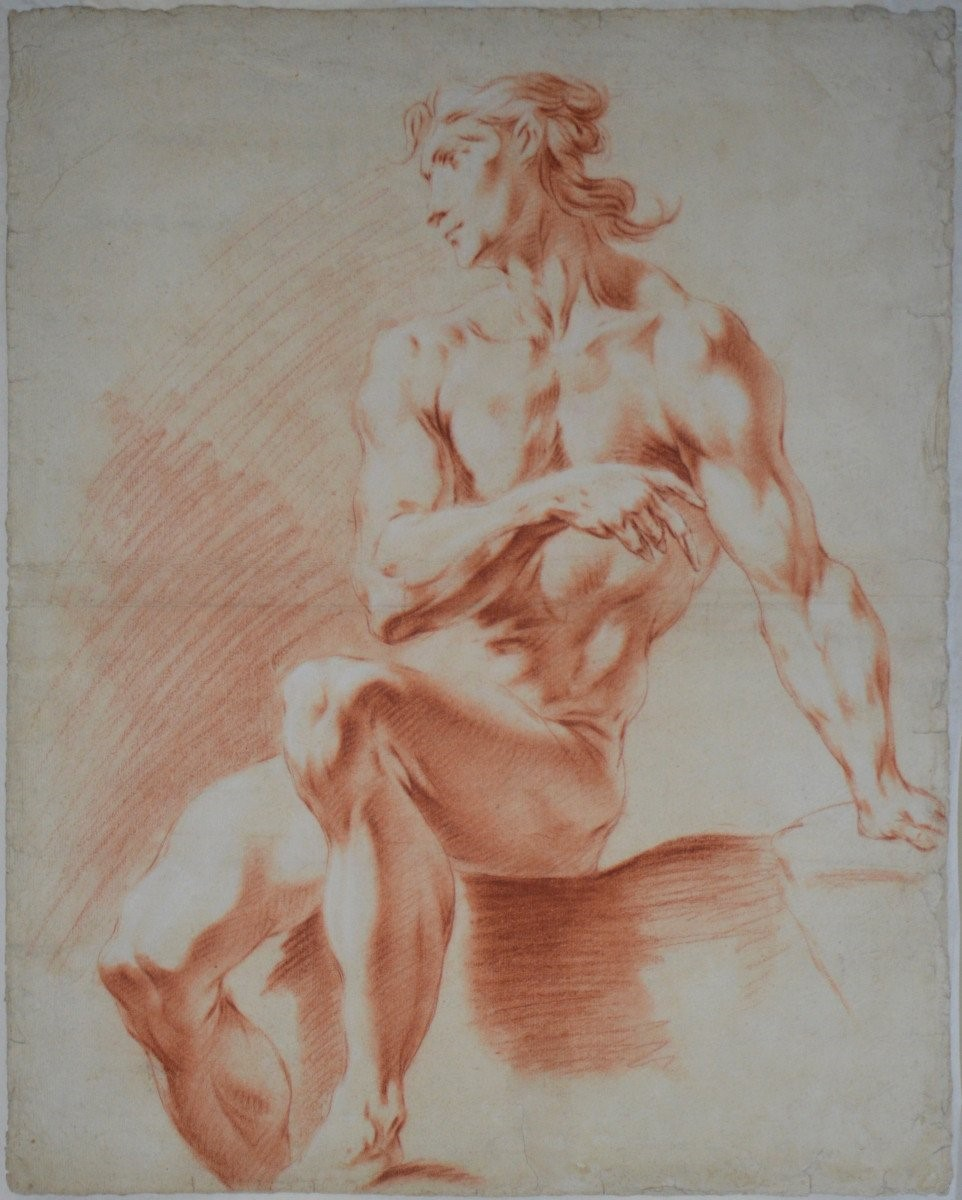
Italian sanguine sketch of a male nude, 18th century

== See also ==
- Doodle
- Draft document, for the same concept, but in writing form
- Etch A Sketch, a toy
- List of sketches of notable people by Marguerite Martyn
- Multi-sketch
- Sketchnoting
- Urban Sketchers

== Sources ==
- Chisholm, Hugh, ed. (1911). "Sketch" . Encyclopædia Britannica. Vol. 25 (11th ed.). Cambridge University Press. p. 186.
- Fabry, Alois (1958). Sketching Basics by Alois Fabry. Mud Puddle Books.
