= Graphic facilitation =

Information visualization method

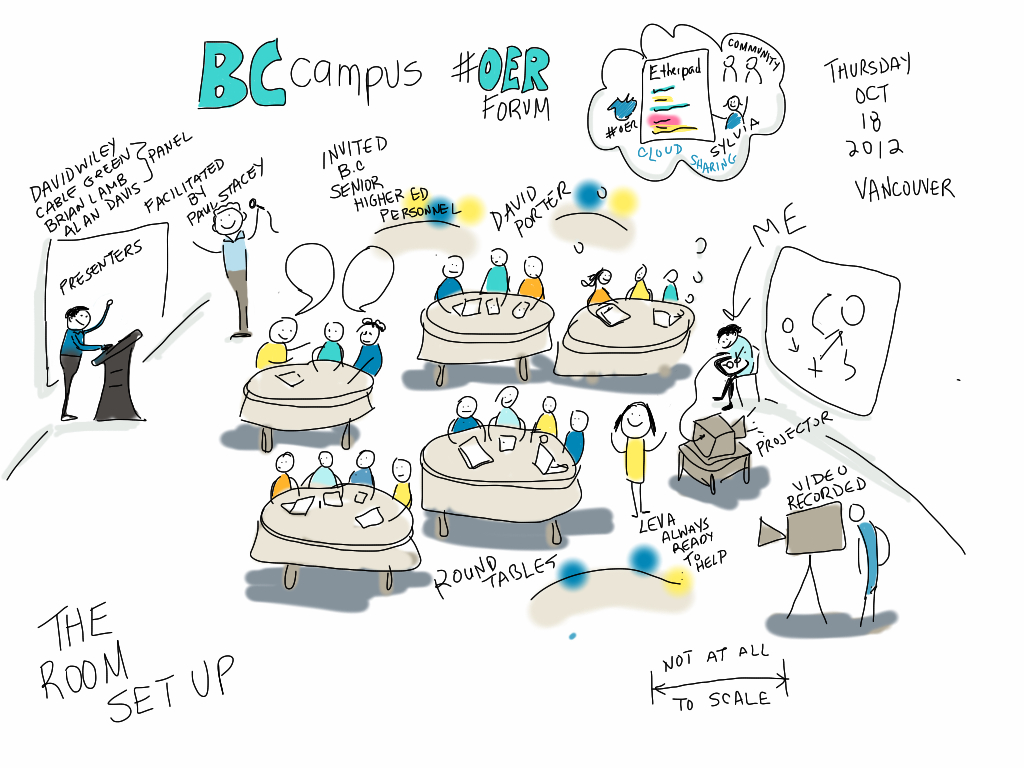
This sketch of a large group meeting shows one person doing graphic recording and another person serving as the group facilitator, among other roles.

Graphic facilitation is the use of a combination of graphics such as diagrams, pictures, symbols, and writing to lead people toward a goal in meetings, seminars, workshops and conferences. The graphics are usually drawn by hand, by a person called a graphic facilitator, who may create the graphics in real time during the event and may work alone or together with another person called a facilitator who aids the discussion.

The article "A Graphic Facilitation Retrospective", written by David Sibbet in 2001, told the story of early pioneers of graphic facilitation who were inspired by architects (with understanding of large imagery), designers, computer engineers (who started to cluster information in a new way), art and psychology. Sibbet described that what at a glance "just" looked like graphics was much more: "It was also dance, and story telling, since the facilitator was constantly in physical motion, miming the group and its communication with movement, as well as commenting on the displays, suggesting processes and the like." An early paper in the field of graphic facilitation was "Explicit Group Memory" by Geoff Ball, who claimed that a shared picture is the best way to support group learning or, more importantly, a lasting memory in the group.

Graphic recording combines the skills of a note-taker and an artist to visually represent information communicated orally in a group of people, but usually without much interaction between the person doing the graphic recording and the other people. Graphic recording is used to create visual summaries of meeting dialogue or conference speakers' presentations. Key skills of graphic recording include listening to people, thinking about what information is most important in what they have said, organizing the information in a way that can be communicated graphically, and drawing graphics that are visually and emotionally appealing.

== See also ==
- Facilitation (business)
- Graphic organizer
- Information design
- Information visualization
- Mind map
- Rich picture
- Sketchnoting
