= Reginald Godfray =

England international rugby union player

- Full name: Reginald Edmund Godfray
- Born: 10 May 1880 St Helier, Jersey
- Died: 4 February 1967 (aged 86) Merton, London, England

Rugby union career
- Position: Centre
International career
Years	Team	Apps	(Points)
1905	England	1	(0)

Reginald Edmund Godfray (10 May 1880 – 4 February 1967) was an English international rugby union player.

Godfray hailed from the island of Jersey and played his rugby in London with the Richmond club. He represented Middlesex and was capped once for England, appearing against the 1905–06 All Blacks. A sturdy centre three–quarter, Godray was said to be a fearless tackler and had a solid defensive game.

== See also ==
- List of England national rugby union players
