= Sydney Start =

England international rugby union player

- Full name: Sydney Philp Start
- Born: 17 May 1969 Salford, Lancashire, England
- Died: 14 December 1969 (aged 0) Harrietsham, Kent, England

Rugby union career
- Position: Three-quarter / Halfback
International career
Years	Team	Apps	(Points)
1907	England	1	(0)

Sydney Philp Start (17 May 1879 – 14 December 1969) was an English international rugby union player.

Born in Salford, Start played his rugby in the Royal Navy and was capped once for England, as a halfback against Scotland at Blackheath in 1907, although his usual position was three-quarter.

Start captained Cambridgeshire in cricket.

A Royal Navy officer, Start was appointed naval aide-de-camp to King George V in 1931.

== See also ==
- List of England national rugby union players
