= George Summerscale =

England international rugby union player

- Full name: George Edward Summerscale
- Born: 1879 Durham, England
- Died: 31 December 1936 (aged 57) Durham, England

Rugby union career
- Position: Forward
International career
Years	Team	Apps	(Points)
1905	England	1	(0)

George Edward Summerscale (1879 – 1936) was an English international rugby union player.

A Durham City forward, Summerscale made a record 49 county appearances for Durham, which included eight championship finals, along with one replay. He was capped once for England, featuring against the touring 1905–06 All Blacks. With club mate Henry Imrie, Summerscale was one of only two players in the team from the north of England.

Summerscale retired in 1909 and remained involved in rugby as an administrator. He served as Durham City club president and held the post of vice president for the Durham RFU.

== See also ==
- List of England national rugby union players
