= Sketchnoting =

Creative and graphic process

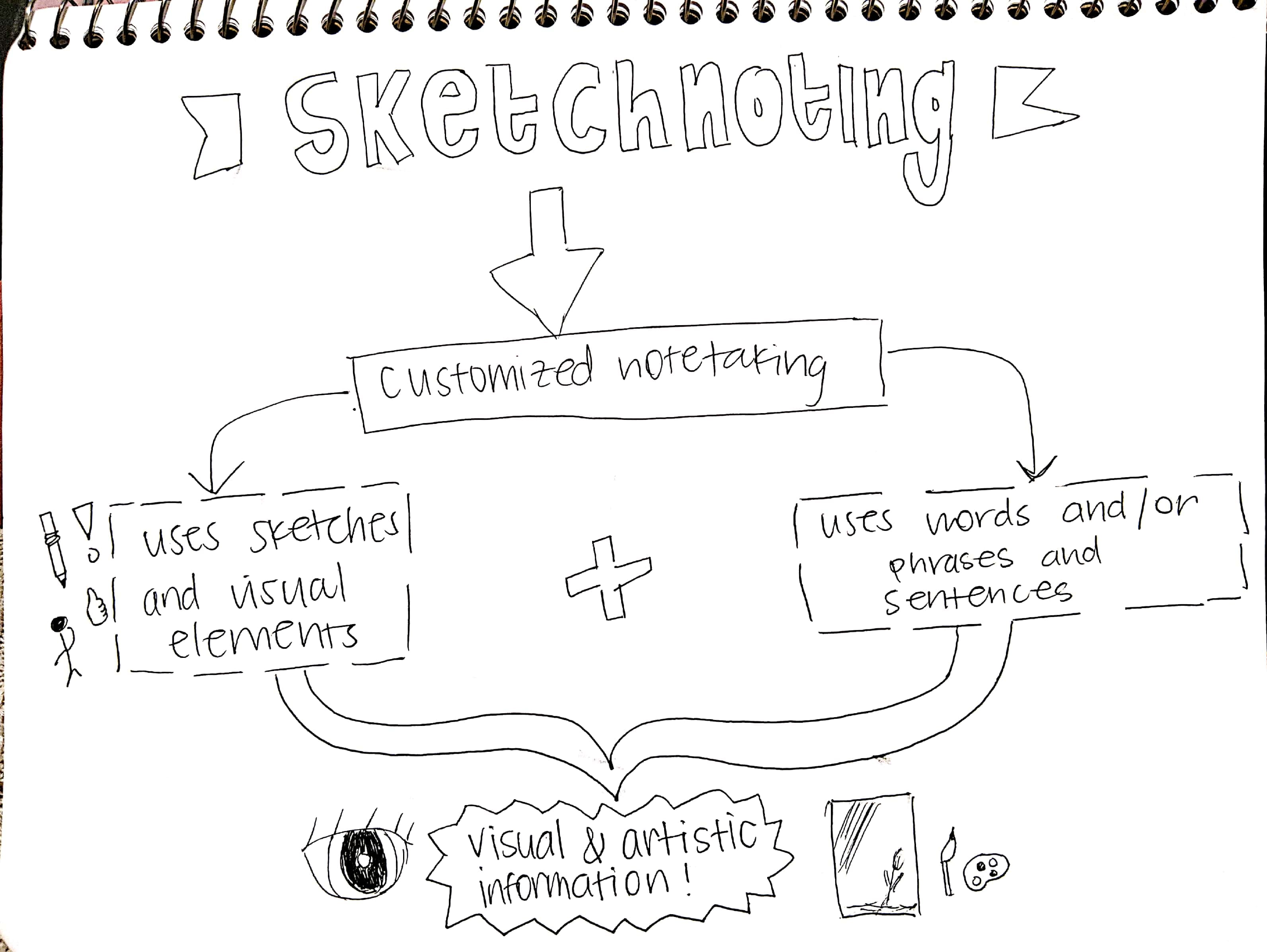
Sketchnoting definition

Sketchnoting, also commonly referred to as visual notetaking, is the creative and graphic process through which an individual can record their thoughts with the use of illustrations, symbols, structures, and texts. By combining graphics with the traditional method of using text, the result is information that is captured and communicated visually and artistically. Sketchnoting can be used in a variety of settings and scenarios, such as at conferences, work meetings, classes in school, sporting events, and more. Some elements associated with sketchnoting techniques include using text, emphasized text, basic shapes, containers, connectors, icons and symbols, and sketches and illustrations.

== History ==
In 2006, designer and author Michael Rohde coined the term "sketchnote". Rohde found traditional notetaking stressful because he felt he could not capture every detail. With that, he wanted to combine traditional note taking methods with doodling to create more memorable notes. After testing out this new technique, Rohde found that it helped him stay focused on the topic at hand, and his memory retention of his notes improved due to the illustrations and visual appeal. At first, Rohde labeled his notes as "sketchnotes" because his technique combined words and sketches to capture key ideas. He later found this word to be fitting, and naturally kept this term. After continuous practice, seven years later, Rohde published two books, The Sketchnote Handbook and The Sketchnote Workbook to inspire others to try sketchnoting.

== Sketchnotes and education ==
Sketchnoting has been popular among teachers and educators due to its reported benefits for retaining information, maintaining attention, encouraging critical thinking and providing creative outlet. There are debates over how sketchnoting should be incorporated into classes (as an optional/obligatory way of taking notes, or by providing drawing activities) as well as how to introduce sketchnotes to students.

== Method ==
1. Planning: The first step involves planning how to take notes and thinking about what components can affect the sketchnotes. Things to consider include notetaking materials, the agenda of the presentation, and the speaker.
2. Listening: The next step is to listen and pay close attention to the speaker. Things to listen for include quotes that summarize key ideas and important details.
3. Processing: After listening to the speaker, one starts processing the content and decides what should be noted. This step involves taking the time to make sense of the information captured in the moment before recording the content. The notes do not reflect everything said by the speaker, nor are they extremely comprehensive.
4. Writing: After processing the content and deciding what information is relevant, one begins writing these key ideas down. This is done quickly, while maintaining consistency and legibility.
5. Drawing: Illustrations and visual elements can be added to supplement written content.

== Elements ==
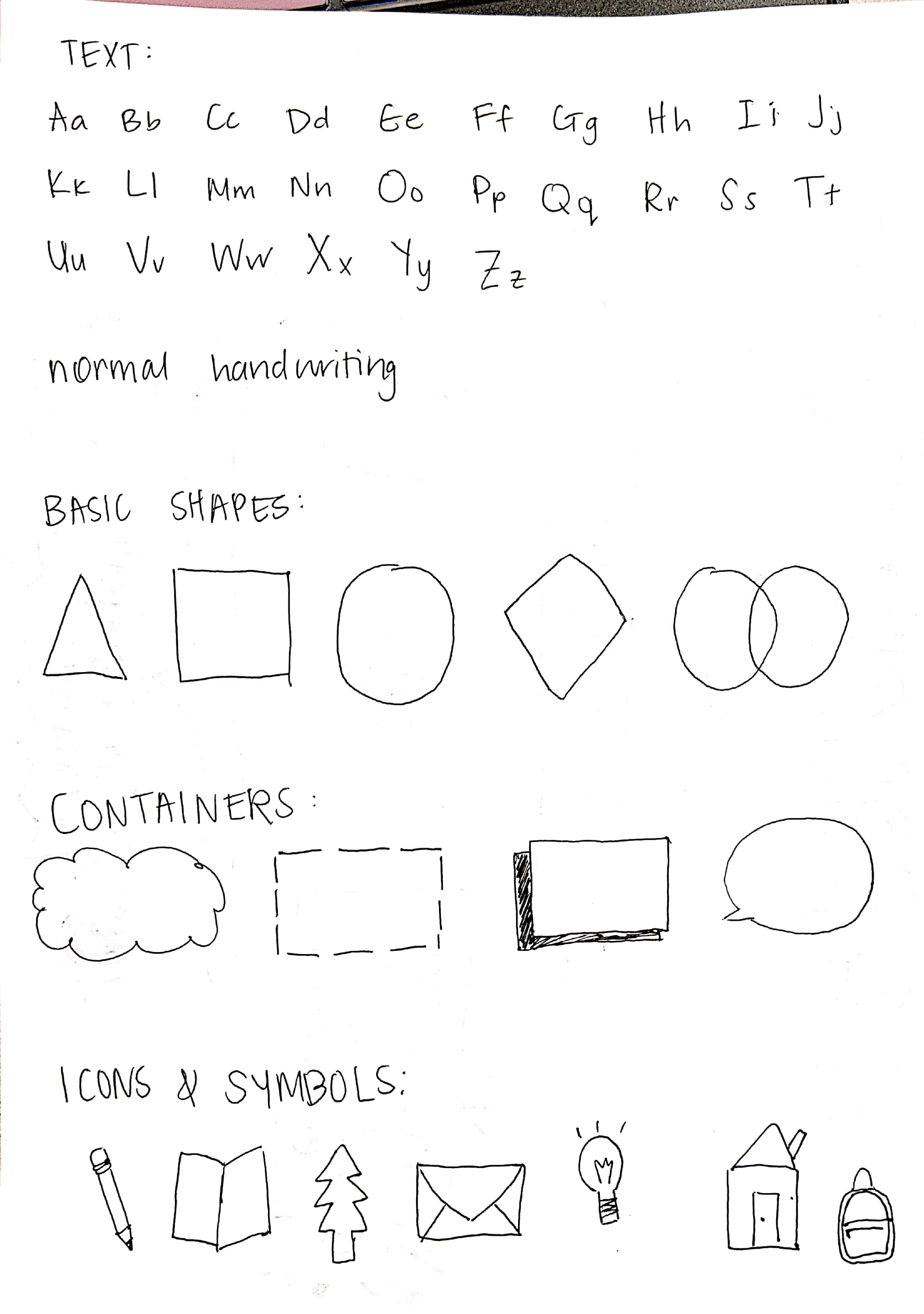
A few visual elements used in sketchnotes

- Text is used for traditional methods of note taking. An example of this is handwritten notes. Handwriting should be consistent and legible.
- Emphasis text is used to make certain text and information stand out. This is commonly used for important concepts or headings. Text can be emphasized by adding a variation to existing handwriting, such as bolding, bubbling letters, or capitalization.
- Basic shapes include basic structures such as rectangles, circles, and triangles. These can be used in substitution for the traditional bullet points. Combining these shapes could also create different figures to represent different information.
- Containers can be used when trying to group together similar ideas. Examples include thought bubbles, boxes, and banners.
- Connectors can be used to connect related ideas to one another. Arrows, dotted lines, and paths can be used to connect one concept to another.
- Icons and symbols should be easy to draw and can be used as a visuals in notes.
- Sketches and illustrations can be used to illustrate analogies or metaphors in an artistic way. Furthermore, these should be quick, easy to draw, and relevant to the content of the notes.
- Shading can be used to add dimension and contrast.
- Colors can be used to distinguish and differentiate the content of the notes. Color choices focus on clarity over aesthetics.

== Misconceptions ==
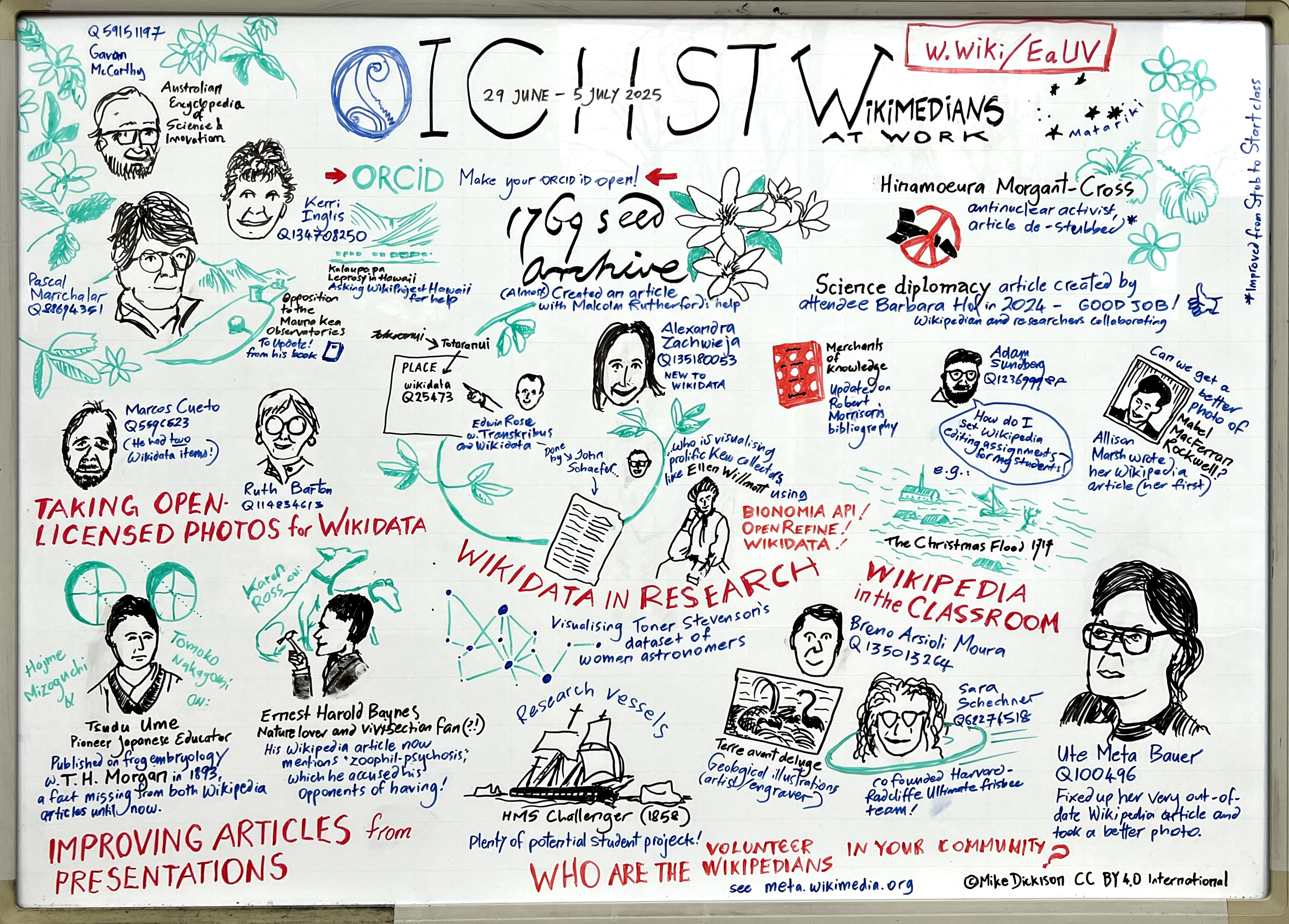
- Sketchnotes summarising a conference
  Right/wrong methods: There is no right or wrong way to sketchnote. Due to various ability levels, not all methods are universally efficient for everyone, resulting in individual styles of sketchnoting.
- Knowing how to draw well: Sketchnoting is not about the sketches or artistic ability. It is about taking notes in a visual way that makes sense to the individual and enhances their learning, whether that is through text, doodles, or images. Furthermore, it is about capturing what was heard and making it memorable for the notetaker.
- Drawing and text limitations: Illustrations are not limited to only sketches; they can be arrows, shapes, icons, or containers. Similarly, text could be used as little or as much as the notetaker desires, as there is no correct or uniform way to sketchnote.

== See also ==
- Drollery
- Graphic organizer
- Graphic recording
- Method of loci
- Mnemonic
- Note-taking
