= Jim Duthie (rugby union) =

England international rugby union player

James Duthie
- Born: 1881 Hartlepool, England
- Died: 29 March 1946 (aged 64) Hartlepool, England

Rugby union career
- Position: Forward
International career
Years	Team	Apps	(Points)
1903	England	1	(0)

James Duthie (1881 – 1946) was an English international rugby union player.

A forward, Duthie was capped for England in 1903, appearing against Wales at Swansea. He featured in the traditional North vs South trials as late as 1909, but didn't reappear with England. At club level, Duthie played for West Hartlepool and Winlaton Vulcans. He played 33 County Championship matches with Durham, which included two winning finals.

== See also ==
- List of England national rugby union players
