= Raphael Jago =

England international rugby union player

- Full name: Raphael Anthony Jago
- Born: 20 January 1882 Chideock, Dorset, England
- Died: 1 March 1941 (aged 59) Plymouth, Devon, England

Rugby union career
- Position: Inside-half
International career
Years	Team	Apps	(Points)
1906–07	England	5	(3)

Raphael Anthony Jago (20 January 1882 – 1 March 1941) was an English international rugby union player.

Jago was born in Chideock, Dorset, and had Cornish ancestry on his mother's side of the family.

A blacksmith by trade, Jago was diminutive, but sturdy half-back. He played his early rugby with Falmouth in Cornwall, until moving to Plymouth and joining Devonport Albion, from where he gained all five of his England caps. This included an international against the touring 1906–07 Springboks. He made 59 appearances for Devon, captaining the county to back to back titles in 1911 and 1912.

== See also ==
- List of England national rugby union players
