= Harry Havelock (rugby union) =

England international rugby union player

- Full name: Henry Havelock
- Born: 1879 Hartlepool, England
- Died: 12 May 1923 (aged 44) Hull, England

Rugby union career
- Position: Wing-forward
International career
Years	Team	Apps	(Points)
1908	England	3	(0)

Henry Havelock (1879 – 1923) was an English international rugby union player.

Powerfully-built, Havelock was a Hartlepool and Durham County player, capped three times for England as a wing-forward in 1908. He thereafter played rugby league, joining Hull in the 1908–09 Northern Rugby Football Union season.

Havelock served in France with the Royal Garrison Artillery during World War I.

Employed as a joiner, Havelock died of blood poisoning in 1923 after grazing his leg while working at Alexandra Dock.

Havelock's son, P. H. W. Havelock, was a soccer player for several Football League clubs.

== See also ==
- List of England national rugby union players
