= Samuel Williams (rugby union) =

England international rugby union player

- Full name: Samuel George Williams
- Born: 14 May 1880 Stoke Damerel, Devon, England
- Died: 19 March 1955 (aged 74) Plymouth, Devon, England

Rugby union career
- Position: Forward
International career
| Years | Team | Apps | (Points) |
| 1902–07 | England | 7 | (6) |

Samuel George Williams (14 May 1880 – 19 March 1955) was an English international rugby union player.

Hailing from Plymouth, Devon, Williams played much of his rugby for local side Albion.

Williams, a fast and strong forward, won his first England call up in 1902, deputising for their captain John Daniell. He made intermittent appearances until 1907, for a total of seven caps, with two tries.

== See also ==
- List of England national rugby union players
