= William Mills (rugby union) =

England international rugby union player

- Full name: William Alonzo Mills
- Born: 2 February 1879 Stoke Damerel, Plymouth, Devon, England
- Died: 9 October 1953 (aged 74) Budeaux, Plymouth, Devon, England

Rugby union career
- Position: Forward
International career
Years	Team	Apps	(Points)
1906–08	England	11	(12)

William Alonzo Mills (2 February 1879 – 9 October 1953) was an English international rugby union player.

Mills, a forward, was of a lighter build than his contemporaries and excelled in open play on account of his speed. He was a product of the Devonport Ramblers and spent his career with the club's senior side Albion. From 1906 to 1908, Mills attained 11 England caps and scored four tries. His appearances included a match against the 1906–07 Springboks.

== See also ==
- List of England national rugby union players
