= Henry Imrie =

England international rugby union player

- Full name: Henry Marshall Imrie
- Born: 1877 Durham, England
- Died: 16 October 1938 (aged 61) Middleton St George, England

Rugby union career
- Position: Wing
International career
Years	Team	Apps	(Points)
1905–07	England	2	(3)

Henry Marshall Imrie (1877 – 1938) was an English international rugby union player.

A Durham City wing three-quarter, Imrie represented Durham on 23 occasions and was a member of the team which won the 1904–05 County Championship, scoring a try against Middlesex in the final. He was capped twice for England, against the touring 1905–06 All Blacks and then a match against Ireland at Lansdowne Road in 1907.

Imrie was a miner by profession and managed the Chopwell Colliery in Gateshead.

== See also ==
- List of England national rugby union players
