= George Dobbs =

England international rugby union player (1884-1917)

George Eric Burroughs Dobbs
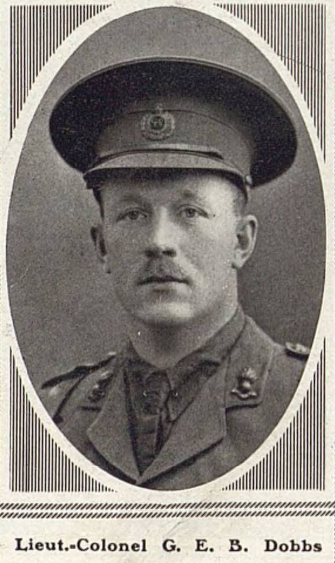
- Born: 21 July 1884 County Kilkenny, Ireland
- Died: 17 June 1917 (aged 32) Poperinge, Belgium

Rugby union career
International career
Years	Team	Apps	(Points)
1906	England	2	
- Military career
- Allegiance: United Kingdom
- Branch: British Army
- Rank: Lieutenant Colonel
- Conflicts: World War I; Western Front (DOW)

George Eric Burroughs Dobbs (21 July 1884 – 17 June 1917) was an Irish-born international rugby union player for England (2 caps as a flanker in the 1906 Home Nations Championship), and served with the British Army from 1904. He served during the First World War, and was promoted to lieutenant colonel. He was killed at Poperinge in 1917 while surveying a cable trench when a stray artillery shell fatally wounded him. He died of wounds later that day.
