= Khaki Roberts =

England international rugby union player

Geoffrey "Khaki" Roberts QC OBE
- Full name: Geoffrey Dorling Roberts
- Born: 27 August 1886 Exeter, England
- Died: 7 March 1967 (aged 80) Southwark, England
- Height: 6 ft 3 in (191 cm)
- University: St John's College, Oxford
- Occupation: Barrister

Rugby union career
- Position: Forward
International career
Years	Team	Apps	(Points)
1907–08	England	3	(6)

Geoffrey Dorling Roberts (27 August 1886 – 7 March 1967), also known as Khaki Roberts, was an English barrister and international rugby union player.

== Biography ==
Born in Exeter, Roberts attended Exeter School and Rugby School. His childhood nickname "Khaki" was believed to have been coined due to his dark complexion, although it has also been said that he was first called the name at a school playground after he got covered in mud and resembled a Khaki-clad British soldier.

Roberts played rugby in his youth, as a forward, and was capped three times for England. While attending St John's College, Oxford, Roberts won blues for rugby in 1908 and 1909.

Admitted to the bar in 1912, Roberts was sent to France soon after with the Devonshire Regiment and received an OBE for his war service. He was appointment as King's Counsel in 1937 and served as Recorder of Exeter from 1932 to 1946. At the Nuremberg trials, Roberts was second in command of the British legal team. He served as lead prosecutor in the high-profile trial of James Camb, accused of murdering actress Gay Gibson, and represented the Crown at the 1952 trial of child killer John Straffen.

== See also ==
- List of England national rugby union players
