= Jimmy Peters (rugby) =

England international rugby union and league footballer

Personal information
- Full name: James Peters
- Born: 7 August 1879 Salford, Lancashire
- Died: 26 March 1954 (aged 74) Plymouth, Devon

Playing information

Rugby union
Club
Years	Team	Pld	T	G	FG	P
	Dings Crusaders
	Knowle RFC
	Bristol Rugby Club
1902–12	Plymouth RFC
	Total	0	0	0	0	0
Representative
Years	Team	Pld	T	G	FG	P
1900–03	Somerset county side
1903–09	Devon county side
1906–08	England	4	1	0	0

Rugby league
Club
Years	Team	Pld	T	G	FG	P
1912–13	Plymouth RFC
1913–14	Barrow RLFC
1914–15	St Helens	2	0	0	0	0
	Total	2	0	0	0	0

James Peters (7 August 1879 – 26 March 1954) was an English rugby union player and, later, a rugby league footballer. He is notable as the first black man to play rugby union for England, and the only black England player until 1988.

== Early life ==
Peters was born at 38 Queen Street in Salford, Lancashire, England. James Peters' Jamaican father, George, had been mauled to death in a training cage by lions. His mother, Hannah Gough originally from Shropshire, was unable to look after him so allowed him to join another circus troupe as a bareback horse rider. He was abandoned by the circus at age 11, having broken his arm, and found himself in Fegan's orphanage in Southwark, and then Little Wanderers' Home in Greenwich, where he captained many of their sports teams. Greenwich Admirals Rugby League Club now celebrate Peters' life with an annual challenge game.

Peters trained in printing and carpentry; his trade brought him to Bristol, where he played as a fly-half for Dings Crusaders, Knowle and Bristol Rugby Club, and represented the Somerset County team between 1900 and 1903. His presence at Bristol was opposed by some on racist grounds: a committee member at Bristol resigned in protest at his selection for the team, whilst a local newspaper described him as a "palid blackamoor", and complained that he was "keeping a white man out of the side". Peters then moved on to Plymouth in 1902, representing Plymouth RUFC, and the Devon county side until 1909. He was the star player in the Devon side which won the County Championship in 1906, resulting in the press calling for his selection for the national team.

== England international ==
On 17 March 1906, Peters won his début cap for England against Scotland. However, The Yorkshire Post pointed out, "his selection is by no means popular on racial grounds". In the match, he set up two tries for England: The Sportsman commented that the "dusky Plymouth man did many good things, especially in passing." He was to play a further game, against France, in which he scored a try.

In October through to December 1906 Peters became embroiled in controversy regarding the touring South African Springboks, as some members objected to him playing against them for Devon due to his colour, and he was not picked for the International game against South Africa, with a number of newspapers citing racial grounds. He went on to be capped for England three more times in 1907 and 1908.

In 1910, Peters lost three fingers in a dockyard accident, and although it was initially feared he could not play again he continued to play until 1912 when politics forced Peters out of rugby union.

== Rugby league ==
Clubs in the south-west of England attempted to form a Western League (later Rugby league) and play competitive fixtures. He was suspended for accepting payment from Devon Rugby Club, which was illegal according to the codes of rugby union. Many players, including Peters, and also RFC Plymouth were suspended by the RFU. Plymouth's ground closed, signalling the end of Plymouth RFC. The rules of professionalism often owed more to politics than finance.

Peters, by then 34 and disillusioned with rugby union, was accepted into rugby league. Returning to his native northwestern England, Peters played for Barrow in 1913, and then transferred to St. Helens in 1914 until his retirement from rugby.

== See also ==
- James Robertson (rugby union, born 1854) - the first known black rugby union player. He played for Royal HSFP and Edinburgh District in the early 1870s. Moving from Scotland to England, he then became England's first black player. He played for Northumberland - the local club, not the County team - in 1879.
- Alfred Clunies-Ross - the first non-white rugby union international player. He was capped by Scotland in the very first international match in 1871. Clunies-Ross was half-Malayan; a Cocos Malays. The Clunies-Ross family were Scots from the Cocos (Keeling) Islands; a previously uninhabited set of islands which they colonised along with Malayan workers. After playing for University of St Andrews RFC, Edinburgh Wanderers and being capped for Scotland, Clunies-Ross briefly played in England, turning out for St. George's Hospital Medical School RFC and then Wasps.

== Sources ==
- Nadine Fletcher, PLAYER PROFILE- Jimmy Peters, World Rugby Museum: from the vaults (January 29, 2015)
