= Harry Havelock (footballer) =

English footballer (1901-1973)

Personal information
- Date of birth: 20 January 1901
- Place of birth: Hull, England
- Date of death: 31 May 1973 (aged 72)
- Positions: Inside right; centre forward

Senior career*
Years	Team	Apps	(Gls)
- Army
1923–1925	Hull City	6	(2)
1925–1926	Lincoln City	27	(17)
1926–1927	Portsmouth	11	(8)
1927–1931	Crystal Palace	67	(39)
1931–1932	Hull City	3	(0)
–	Folkestone		
- * Club domestic league appearances and goals

Peter Henry W. Havelock (20 January 1901 – 31 May 1973) was an English professional footballer who scored 66 goals from 114 appearances in the Football League playing as an inside right or centre forward for Hull City, Lincoln City, Portsmouth and Crystal Palace.

== Football career ==
Havelock was born in Hull. He played Army football before joining Hull City, making his debut in the Second Division in the 1923–24 Football League season. He soon moved on to Lincoln City of the Third Division North, where he played for little more than six months, but still finished as the club's leading scorer for 1925–26, with 18 goals from 30 League and FA Cup games. Havelock then returned to the Second Division with Portsmouth. Although he played only infrequently, he contributed to the club's promotion to the First Division at the end of the 1926–27 season with a winning goal against Wolverhampton Wanderers and the opening goal in a 2–0 defeat of Hull City; according to The Times' correspondent, "the inclusion of Havelock in their forward line was successful" and "Havelock and Haines were prominent throughout". Portsmouth finished level on points with Manchester City and were promoted on goal average – "by the merest fraction of a goal" – on the last day of the season.

Havelock never played for Portsmouth in the First Division, instead dropping back to the third tier with Crystal Palace. In four seasons in the Third Division South, again not playing regularly, he scored 43 goals from 76 appearances in League and Cup, and was the club's top scorer in the 1928–29 season with 24 goals (20 in the League). He "played a splendid game at inside-right" to score a hat-trick as Palace beat Luton Town 7–0 in a Third Round replay in the 1928–29 FA Cup to record their equal-best FA Cup win. He returned to Hull City for the 1931–32 season and then played for Southern League club Folkestone.

Havelock died in 1973 at the age of 72.
