= Frank Boylen =

GB & England international dual-code rugby footballer

Personal information
- Full name: Francis Boylen
- Born: 14 September 1878 Hartlepool, England
- Died: 3 February 1938 (aged 59) Kingston upon Hull, England

Playing information
- Height: 5 ft 8.5 in (1.740 m)
- Weight: 13 st 5 lb (85 kg)

Rugby union
Club
| Years | Team | Pld | T | G | FG | P |
|---|---|---|---|---|---|---|
| | Hartlepool Rovers |
| ≤1908–08 | West Hartlepool R.F.C. |
| | Total | 0 | 0 | 0 | 0 | 0 |
Representative
| Years | Team | Pld | T | G | FG | P |
| 1903–08 | Durham |
| 1908 | England | 4 | 0 | 0 | 0 | 0 |

Rugby league
- Position: Forward
Club
| Years | Team | Pld | T | G | FG | P |
|---|---|---|---|---|---|---|
| 1908–12 | Hull F.C. | 100 |
| 1912–14 | York | 43 | 1 |
| 1914–≥14 | Hull Kingston Rovers | 38 | 1 | 0 | 0 | 3 |
| 1914–≥14 | →Hull F.C. (guest) | 41 |
| | Total | 222 | 2 | 0 | 0 | 3 |
Representative
| Years | Team | Pld | T | G | FG | P |
| | Yorkshire |
| 1909–10 | England | 3 | 0 | 0 | 0 | 0 |
| 1909 | Great Britain | 1 | 0 | 0 | 0 | 0 |

Francis "Frank" Boylen (14 September 1878 – 3 February 1938), also known by the nickname of "Patsy", was an English rugby union, and professional rugby league footballer who played in the 1900s and 1910s. He played representative level rugby union (RU) for England and Durham, and at club level for Hartlepool Excelsior, Hartlepool Old Boys, Hartlepool Rovers and West Hartlepool R.F.C., and representative level rugby league (RL) for Great Britain, England and Yorkshire, and at club level for Hull F.C. (two spells, including the second as World War I guest), York and Hull Kingston Rovers as a forward.

== Background ==
Frank Boylen was born in Hartlepool, County Durham, and he died aged 59 in Kingston upon Hull, East Riding of Yorkshire, England.

== Playing career ==
=== International honours ===
Frank Boylen won caps for England (RU) while at Hartlepool Rovers, and/or West Hartlepool R.F.C., in 1908 against France, Wales, Ireland, and Scotland, and won caps for England (RL) while at Hull in 1909 against Australia, and Wales, in 1910 against Wales, and won a cap for Great Britain (RL) while at Hull in 1909 against Australia.

=== County honours ===
Re-issued Birth from 1892 for Francis Boylen

Marriage Certificate for Francis Boylen and Florence King

Frank Boylen won caps for Durham (RU) while at Hartlepool Rovers, and/or West Hartlepool R.F.C., winning the rugby union County Championship title in 1905, and 1907 (title shared with Devon Rugby Football Union), and played for Durham (RU) in the 3–16 defeat by New Zealand (The Original All Blacks) at Durham Ground on 7 October 1905, and the 4–22 defeat by South Africa (1906–07 South Africa rugby union tour) at Hartlepool on 6 October 1906.

=== Challenge Cup Final appearances ===
Frank Boylen played as a forward in Hull F.C.'s 0–17 defeat by Wakefield Trinity in the 1909 Challenge Cup Final during the 1908–09 season at Headingley, Leeds on Saturday 24 April 1909, in front of a crowd of 23,587.

=== Club career ===
Frank Boylen played in the combined Hartlepool Clubs 0–63 defeat by The Original All Blacks at Hartlepool Rovers' ground on 11 October 1905.

== Outside of rugby ==
Frank Boylen worked at the British Oxygen Company (BOC) in Kingston upon Hull.

== Genealogical information ==
Frank Boylen's parents John and Mary (Morgan) were Irish. Frank Boylen married Florence Maud Mary King at Holy Trinity Church, Hartlepool, on 28 December 1902. He had two sisters, Nellie born 1885 and Mary born in 1879 and a brother, James, born in 1887. The 1881 census shows the family living at 8 Fox Street in Hartlepool. 1891 Census showed the brothers as being in Hartlepool workhouse. The couple had five children: Frank (1903), Florence (1905), Doris, Vera and Eric (died age 3). They also brought up Florence's sisters children: Jane, George and Florence Barningham.
