= Thomas Hogarth (rugby union) =

England international rugby union player

Tom Hogarth
- Born: 16 February 1878 Hartlepool, England
- Died: 12 July 1960 (aged 82) Middlesbrough, England
- Occupation: Shipyard blacksmith

Rugby union career
- Position: Forward
Senior career
Years	Team	Apps	(Points)
1906–14	Leicester Tigers	112	(21)
International career
Years	Team	Apps	(Points)
1906	England	1	(0)

Thomas Bradley Hogarth (16 February 1878 – 12 July 1960) was a rugby union forward who played for Leicester Tigers, Hartlepool Rovers, West Hartlepool, Durham City and once for England.

Hogarth made his international debut for England on 22 March 1906 against France at Parc des Princes. He then joined Leicester in March 1906, making his debut against Newport. In 1908 his transfer to Leicester was subject of an RFU inquiry because of alleged professionalism. Hogarth and the Leicester club were cleared of all charges, with Hogarth's testimony mentioned as beyond question, though the neutrality of the inquiry is questionable as the day it closed Leicester's Welford Road hosted an England international in which two of the other players involved in the inquiry started.

Hogarth became Leicester's first substitute in 1911 when he replaced Frank Tarr after only 2 minutes in a game against Manchester R.F.C.

== Sources ==
Farmer, Stuart & Hands, David Tigers-Official History of Leicester Football Club (The Rugby DevelopmentFoundation ISBN 978-0-9930213-0-5)
