= Prewriting =

First stage of the writing process

Prewriting is the first stage of the writing process, typically followed by drafting, revision, editing and publishing. Prewriting can consist of a combination of outlining, diagramming, storyboarding, and clustering (for a technique similar to clustering, see mindmapping).

== Motivation and audience awareness ==
Prewriting usually begins with motivation and audience awareness: what is the student or writer trying to communicate, why is it important to communicate it well and who is the audience for this communication. It helps you put your thought out onto the paper on what you want to write about. Writers usually begin with a clear idea of audience, content and the importance of their communication; sometimes, one of these needs to be clarified for the best communication. When figuring out who a writer's audience is, they should consider the level of where their potential audience stands. Are you writing for someone who is above you, below you, or on the same level? Once that is known, the interests and experiences of said audience should be considered.Student writers find motivation especially difficult because they are writing for a teacher or for a grade, instead of a real audience. Often teachers try to find a real audience for students by asking them to read to younger classes or to parents, by posting writing for others to read, by writing a blog, or by writing on real topics, such as a letter to the editor of a local newspaper.

== Choosing a topic ==
One important task in prewriting is choosing a topic and then narrowing it to a length that can be covered in the space allowed. Oral storytelling is an effective way to search for a good topic for a personal narrative. Writers can quickly tell a story and judge from the listeners' reactions whether it will be an interesting topic to write about.

Another way to find a topic is to freewrite, a method first popularized by Peter Elbow. When freewriting, you write any and every idea that comes to mind. This could also be a written exploration of your current knowledge of a broad topic, with the idea that you are looking for a narrow topic to write about. Often freewriting is timed. The writer is instructed to keep writing until the time period ends, which encourages him/her to keep writing past the pre-conceived ideas and hopefully find a more interesting topic.

Several other methods of choosing a topic overlap with another broad concern of prewriting, that of researching or gathering information. Reading is effective in both choosing and narrowing a topic and in gathering information to include in the writing. As a writer reads other works, it expands ideas, opens possibilities and points toward options for topics and narrates specific content for the eventual writing. One traditional method of tracking the content read is to create annotated note cards with one chunk of information per card. Writers also need to document music, photos, web sites, interviews, and any other source used to prevent plagiarism.

Besides reading what others also make original observations relating to a topic. This requires on-site visits, experimentation with something, or finding original or primary historical documents. Writers interact with the setting or materials and make observations about their experience. For strong writing, particular attention should be given to sensory details (what the writer hears, tastes, touches, smells and feels). While gathering material, often writers pay particular attention to the vocabulary used in discussing the topic. This would include slang, specific terminology, translations of terms, and typical phrases used. The writer often looks up definitions, synonyms and finds ways that different people use the terminology. Lists, journals, teacher-student conference, drawing illustrations, using imagination, restating a problem in multiple ways, watching videos, inventorying interests – these are some of the other methods for gathering information.

== Discussing information ==
After reading and observing, often writers need to discuss material. They might brainstorm with a group on topics or how to narrow a topic. Or, they might discuss events, ideas, and interpretations with just one other person. Oral storytelling might enter again, as the writer turns it into a narrative, or just tries out ways of using the new terminology. Sometimes writers draw or use information as basis for artwork as a way to understand the material better. Starting with peer evaluation in the beginning of the school year can help students build comfort with discussing this kind of information.

== Narrowing the topic ==
Narrowing a topic is an important step of prewriting. For example, a personal narrative of five pages could be narrowed to an incident that occurred in a thirty-minute time period. This restricted time period means the writer must slow down and tell the event moment by moment with many details. By contrast, a five-page essay about a three-day trip would only skim the surface of the experience. The writer must consider again the goals of communication – content, audience, importance of information – but add to this a consideration of the format for the writing. He or she should consider how much space is allowed for the communication and how What can be effectively communicated within that space? Understanding what a piece of writing is for and who the audience is going to be are basic building blocks of organizing content well. They are powerful considerations in determining what needs to be said and how it needs to be said. Researching relevant material, planning ideas, and aligning with what the audience will expect all contribute to a solid draft. Through revising, editing, and ongoing skill development, authors refine their work to produce clear and effective communication.

== Organizing content ==
At this point, the writer needs to consider the organization of content. Outlining in a hierarchical structure is one of the typical strategies, and usually includes three or more levels in the hierarchy. Typical outlines are organized by chronology, spatial relationships, or by subtopics. Other outlines might include sequences along a continuum: big to little, old to new, etc. Clustering, a technique of creating a visual web that represents associations among ideas, is another help in creating structure, because it reveals relationships. Storyboarding is a method of drawing rough sketches to plan a picture book, a movie script, a graphic novel or other fiction.

== Developmental acquisition of organizing skills ==
While information on the developmental sequence of organizing skills is sketchy, anecdotal information suggests that children follow this rough sequence: 1) sort into categories, 2) structure the categories into a specific order for best communication, using criteria such as which item will best work to catch readers attention in the opening, 3) within a category, sequence information into a specific order for best communication, using criteria such as what will best persuade an audience. At each level, it is important that student writers discuss their decisions; they should understand that categories for a certain topic could be structured in several different ways, all correct. A final skill acquired is the ability to omit information that is not needed in order to communicate effectively.

Even sketchier is information on what types of organization are acquired first, but anecdotal information and research suggests that even young children understand chronological information, making narratives the easiest type of student writing. Persuasive writing usually requires logical thinking and studies in child development indicate that logical thinking is not present until a child is 10–12 years old, making it one of the later writing skills to acquire. Before this age, persuasive writing will rely mostly on emotional arguments.

== Writing trials ==
Writers also use the prewriting phase to experiment with ways of expressing ideas. For oral storytelling, a writer could tell a story three times, but each time begin at a different time, include or exclude information, end at a different time or place. Writers often try writing the same information. but using different voices, in search of the best way to communicate this information or tell this story. Using dramatic dialogue to improve student writing shows four stage methods in order to use dramatic role-play and dialogue writing to help college freshmen develop stronger writing skills.

== Recursion ==
Prewriting is recursive, that is, it can occur at any time in the writing process and can return several times. For example, after a first draft, a writer may need to return to an information gathering stage, or may need to discuss the material with someone, or may need to adjust the outline. While the writing process is discussed as having distinct stages, in reality, they often overlap and circle back on one another.

== Variables ==
Prewriting varies depending on the writing task or rhetorical mode. Fiction requires more imaginative thinking while informational essays or expository writing require more organizational thinking. Persuasive writing must consider not just the information to be communicated, but how best to change the reader's ideas or convictions. Folktales will require extensive reading of the genre to learn common conventions. Each writing task will require a different selection of prewriting strategies, used in a different order.

== Technology ==
Technological tools are often used in prewriting tasks, including word processors, spreadsheets and publishing programs; however, technology appears to be more useful in the revision, editing and publishing phases of prewriting. Technology can be used at various stages of the writing process in schools. In writing drafting, technology can minimize barriers by enabling students to write by hand instead of using the keyboard, which can promote fluency and eliminate some of the fear associated with perfectionism. Having access to devices such as graphic organizers, templates, and brainstorming software can help in pre-writing by helping students develop and organize ideas. Technology makes it easier to identify spelling and grammatical errors, reorganize content, and fine-tune language than can be done by humans. The software makes revision simpler and easier to obtain. Technology benefits disabled students by providing alternatives for involvement in writing activity and, perhaps, enhancing their writing experience even further.

== Writing tests ==
Teaching writing as a process is accepted pedagogical practice, but there is increasing concern that writing tests do not allow for the full writing process, especially cutting short the time needed for prewriting tasks. Pre- and post-tests can be used as writing evaluations to examine students' development during the prewriting phase. Both tests are usually used in tracking the potential effect of comments on students' preparation for writing. By comparing the results of both phases, teachers might gain the ability to ascertain areas where students show improvement or where extra support might be catered to, especially under limited instructional time.

== Collaborative prewriting ==
Different prewriting strategies can be categorized into individual process and collaborative process. For example, planning is an individual process, and group brainstorming and reading contents are collaborative process. Different types of prewriting can impact the performance of writing in different ways. Individual prewriting can improve analytic ratings. While collaborative prewriting is more complicated.

In general, collaborative prewriting can improve the accuracy of language especially with instruction from teachers. Looking more carefully into collaborative prewriting, there are 3 important process: reading comprehension, collaborative fill-in-the-blanks concept maps(CFCM), and collaborative construct concept maps (CCCM).

Reading comprehension could be a predictor of the performance of writing. Reading, reflecting, and connecting the articles can make students understand content with more inspiration. The two mapping strategies can also be strategies of improving reading comprehension ability and lead to better writing. Both mapping strategies can help students to organize and sort key information. CCCM is more focused on comprehension, application, and analysis ability, while CFCM is more about understanding the content and align their writing with the original article.

In order to understand and evaluate the effect of prewriting, further research on writing format, time factor, student's attitude towards different prewriting strategies should be done in the future.

== Impact ==
Despite the impact of prewriting, many students continue to underrate the importance of this process. Research shows that students seldom ask for help until the review process.

Overall, prewriting has positive impact on writing performance, and a well functioned prewriting task gives the opportunity for students to reflect ideas and gain ideas from others, resulting in more significant outcomes.
