= Book report =

School assignment in which students discuss the content of a book

A book report is an essay discussing the contents of a book, written as part of a class assignment issued to students in schools. There is a difference between a book report and a book review. A report includes a larger outline, and a review stays on the topic of the book. Teachers frequently give students a list of books from which they may choose one for the report, although sometimes students may select a work entirely of their own choosing. Teachers may set the list of books through such methods as including the works of one particular author, reading multiple works to students aloud and having each student select one of the books for the report, allow students to choose freely, or choose the books through a class selection process.

The contents of the book report, for a work of fiction, typically include basic bibliographical information about the work, a summary of the narrative and setting, main elements of the stories of key characters, the author's purpose in creating the work, the student's opinion of the book, and a theme statement summing up the main idea drawn from a reading of the book.

== Book report and book review differences ==
A book review makes an evaluation of a particular book outlining the various pros and cons of the book to help the reader know if it is the right book to read, touching base on its plot and writing style. The book review also provides a conclusion giving a recommendation on whether one should purchase the book or not.

A book report, on the other hand, is meant to outline the key aspects of that particular book helping readers understand what the book generally talks about. A book report is a summary of what a particular book is about, and typically includes:

- Theme and character analysis
- The tone, time and also the setting of the story
- The author of the book and when it was published among other key details of the book
- State out quotes used to support the message being emphasized in the story

To ease the process of writing the narrative and stories of the main characters, students may be advised to write sequence of action summaries, story 'pyramids', or story journals.

Book reports may be accompanied by other creative works such as illustrations, "shoe box" dioramas, or report covers.

Individual components of the book report can also be made into separate artistic works, including pop-up cards, newsletters, character diaries, gameboards, word searches, and story maps.

Students are typically advised to produce the report in multiple stages, including prewriting, first draft writing, revision, first evaluation, editing and rewriting, publishing, and post-project evaluation.
