= Cornell University School of Continuing Education and Summer Sessions =

The announcement for the 1973 Summer Session

Cornell University’s School of Continuing Education and Summer Sessions provides educational opportunities on the Cornell campus, online, and around the world during Summer Session, Winter Session, and throughout the academic year. Offerings include courses for undergraduates, programs for high school students, extramural study, professional programs, study tours for adults, and weeklong summer programs for adults, youth, and families on the Cornell campus.

== History ==
In 1876, eight years after its founding, Cornell University offered its first summer programs in botany, chemistry, drawing, entomology, geology, and zoology.

Cornell University Summer Session, historically known as Summer Courses, the Summer Term, or the Summer School, was formally established in 1892, one of the earliest such programs in the United States.

In 1898, Dr. Charles DeGarmo, the former president of Swarthmore College in Pennsylvania, joined Cornell as Professor of the Science and Art of Education. He was later appointed the first dean of the faculty of the Summer Session.

Later that year, Anna Botsford Comstock became the first woman to hold a professorial rank at Cornell when she was named assistant professor of nature study in the Summer School.

Public lectures, readings, and recitals were offered in the summer as early as 1905 (speakers included Andrew Dickson White) and 1906 and continue today as Cornell’s free summer events series, featuring weekly performances at the Center for Performing Arts, outdoor concerts, and a lecture series (introduced now, as in the early 1900s, by the Summer Session director).

In 1935, the Cornell University Board of Trustees, in response to a report about the “desirability of having extramural courses offered for credit by Cornell University,” approved the establishment of such courses. This marked the beginning of the Division of Extramural Courses, which later became part of the School of Continuing Education and Summer Sessions.

In 1958, the Cornell University Board of Trustees appointed William A. Smith, professor of education, as director of the Division of Summer Session, Extramural Courses and Part-time Study, marking the uniting of these programs under one director.

In the 1950s, Cornell offered its first programs for high school students. In 1958, Cornell Professor Walter Pauk launched the High School Reading Improvement Program, inviting high school juniors and seniors to Cornell during the summer to “develop the reading skills and study techniques which will bring them success in college.” This program grew into what is now known as Cornell University Summer College Programs for High School Students.

In 1968, two one-week summer programs were offered to Cornell alumni and their families under the auspices of the newly formed Cornell's Alumni University (now Cornell's Adult University), or CAU.

In 1973, CAU initiated a program of off-campus study tours with "a weekend of inquiry and escape" at Split Rock Lodge in the Poconos.

In 1975, the Division of Summer Session, Extramural Courses and Part-time Study (now the School of Continuing Education and Summer Sessions) launched Cornell’s Visitors Program, allowing area residents to attend Cornell courses for a nominal fee.

In the winter of 1975-76, Cornell grad Alice Stone Nakhimovsky led a three-credit course in Russia featuring two weeks in Moscow and Leningrad, followed by a week back on the Cornell campus. The course's popularity led to the creation of additional study abroad options during the winter break and the establishment of a regular roster of Winter Session courses at Cornell.

In 1992, the Division of Summer Session, Extramural Study, and Related Programs became the School of Continuing Education and Summer Sessions (SCE) under the guidance of dean Glenn C. Altschuler. An award-winning professor, former vice president for university relations (2009–2013), and author of numerous books (including, with Isaac Kramnick, Cornell: A History, 1940–2015), Altschuler continues to serve as SCE dean.

== Programs ==
The School of Continuing Education and Summer Sessions offers credit and non-credit courses, full-semester classes, one-day executive seminars, off-campus programs, online learning opportunities, travel programs, internships, and more through the following programs or units:

Cornell University Summer Sessions offer open admission for approximately 3,000 students every summer to 500+ classes and programs on campus, off campus (including campus-to-career programs with internship opportunities), and online.

Cornell University Winter Session offers open admission to three-week classes on campus, off campus, and online during the break between academic semesters.

Cornell University’s Summer College Programs for High School Students provides precollege programs for hundreds of high school sophomores, juniors, and seniors in subjects such as architecture, art, business, engineering, environmental studies, history and politics, hotel management, law and government, medicine, psychology, science and research, and veterinary medicine.

Cornell’s Adult University (CAU) sponsors educational study tours and weeklong summer programs on campus designed and led by Cornell faculty.

Extramural/part-time study opportunities are available through the School for undergraduate and graduate students, university employees, high school students, retirees, corporate learners, and international students.

Professional Studies programs such as the Administrative Management Institute and the Institute for Internet Culture, Policy, and Law provide intensive learning experiences for professionals, executives, and students.

Cornell in Washington programs during the fall, spring, and summer provide opportunities for students to live and intern in Washington, DC, while earning credits in courses taught by Cornell faculty.

Campus-to-Career programs in law, business management, health studies, and other disciplines link academic study with intensive career exploration and give students an opportunity to develop professional contacts, gain real-world experience, and strengthen their resumes.

Study-abroad programs for credit are administered by the School during the summer and winter sessions. A free summer events series, open to the public, brings notable speakers and performers to the Cornell campus, such as Joyce Carol Oates, A. R. Ammons, M. H. Abrams, Vanaver Caravan, Jay Ungar and Molly Mason, John McCutcheon, and Joe Crookston.

== Faculty ==
The School of Continuing Education and Summer Sessions features faculty members from across the university; leaders in higher education, industry, and government; and distinguished scholars from around the world. The roster varies by semester and program.
