= KWL =

KWL may refer to:

- KWL Table, a graphical organizer.
- Guilin Liangjiang International Airport, an airport with KWL as its IATA code.
- Kidwelly railway station, Kidwelly, Carmarthenshire, National Rail station code
