= Note-taking =

Practice of recording information

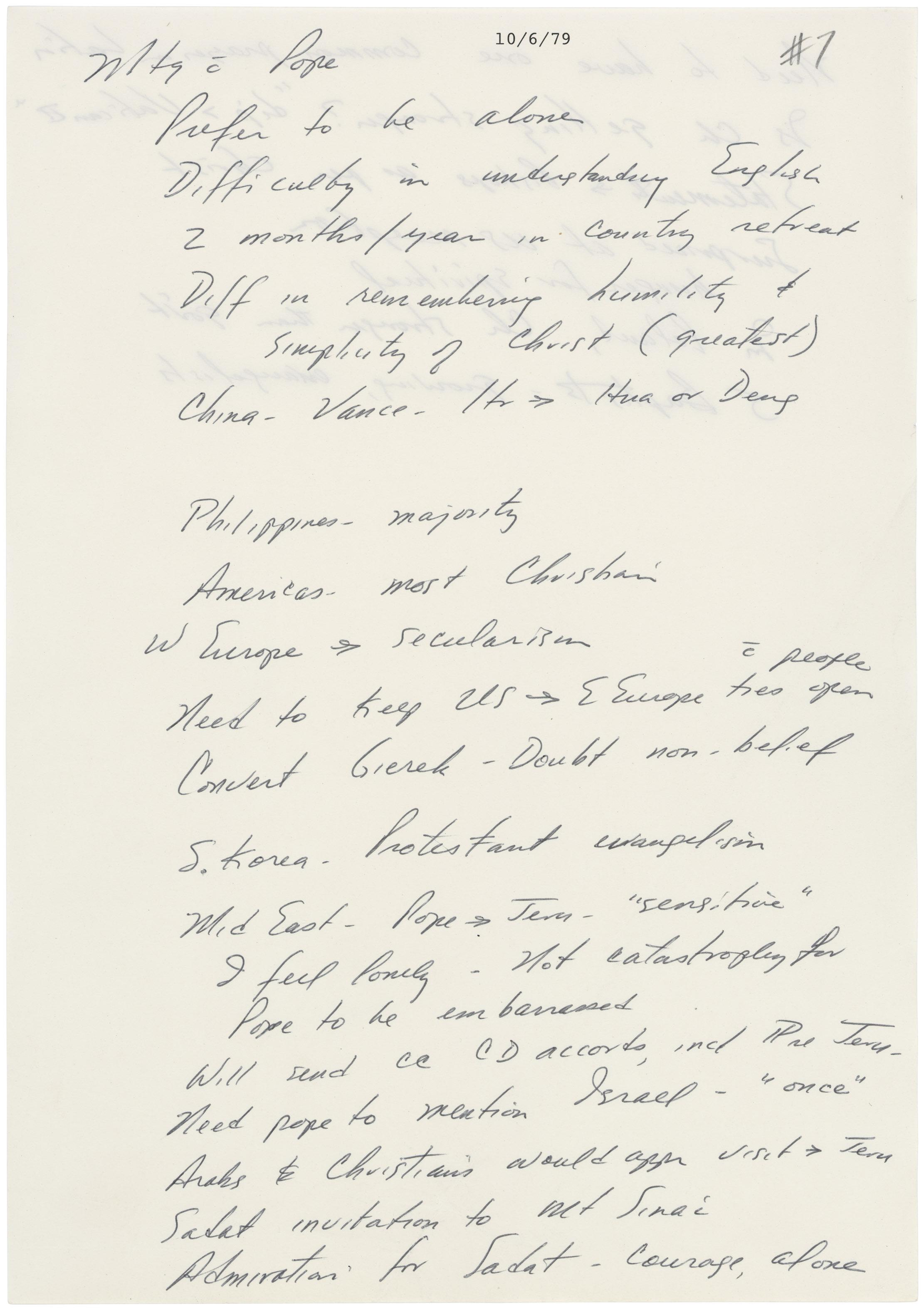
U.S. President Jimmy Carter's notes from his private meeting with Pope John Paul II, October 6, 1979.

Note-taking (sometimes written as notetaking or note taking) is the practice of recording information from different sources and platforms. By taking notes, the writer records the essence of the information, freeing their mind from having to recall everything. Notes are commonly drawn from a transient source, such as an oral discussion at a meeting, or a lecture (notes of a meeting are usually called minutes), in which case the notes may be the only record of the event. Since the advent of writing and literacy, notes traditionally were almost always handwritten (often in notebooks), but the introduction of notetaking software and websites has made digital notetaking possible and widespread. Note-taking is a foundational skill in personal knowledge management.

== History ==
Note-taking has been an important part of human history and scientific development. The Ancient Greeks developed hypomnema, personal records on important subjects. In the Renaissance and early modern period, students learned to take notes in schools, academies and universities, often producing beautiful volumes that served as reference works after they finished their studies. In pre-digital times, people used many kinds of notebooks, including commonplace books, accounting waste books, and marginalia. Philosopher John Locke developed and published a popular indexing system which served as a model for commonplace books and inspired at least ten different published editions of commonplace book templates in Europe and the Americas as well as Bell's Common-Place Book, Form'd Generally upon the Principles Recommended and Practised by Mr Locke (London, 1770).

== Cognitive psychology ==
Note-taking is a central aspect of a complex human behavior related to information management involving a range of underlying mental processes and their interactions with other cognitive functions. The person taking notes must acquire and filter the incoming sources, organize and restructure existing knowledge structures, comprehend and write down their explanation of the information, and ultimately store and integrate the freshly processed material. The result is a knowledge representation, and a memory storage. Studies comparing the performance of students who took handwritten notes to students who typed their notes found that students who took handwritten notes performed better on examinations, hypothetically due to the deeper processing of learned material through selective rephrasing instead of word-for-word transcription which is common when typing notes.

== Reasons for note-taking ==
Note-taking is a good strategy to enhance learning and memory, as it allows the notetaker to be selective and reorganize ideas during a lecture. These notes can be reworded in an easier way that will facilitate the understanding of the content taught in class. Afterward, the notes can be used to help process, recall, and use information that has been rapidly gone through during the lecture.

Taking notes on different words used in lectures fosters vocabulary learning and stimulates autonomous learning of actively engaged individuals.

== Systems ==
Many different formats are used to structure information and make it easier to find and to understand later. The format of the initial record may often be informal and/or unstructured. One common format for such notes is shorthand, which can allow large amounts of information to be put on paper very quickly. Historically, note-taking was an analog process, written in notebooks, or other paper methods like Post-It notes. In the digital age, use of computers, tablet PCs and personal digital assistants (PDAs) is common.

The note taker usually has to work fast, and different note-taking styles and techniques try to make the best use of time. The average rate of speech is 2–3 words per second (which is 120-180 words per minute), but the average handwriting speed as only 0.2–0.3 words per second (which is 12-18 words per minute).

Regardless of the medium, note-taking can be broadly divided into linear and nonlinear methods, which can be combined.

Regardless of the system used, it can be best to focus on writing down the most important information first.

== Linear note-taking ==
Linear note-taking is the process of recording information in the order in which you receive it. Linear notes are typically chronological outlines of a lecture or a text. Linear note taking is a common means of taking notes, however, the potential to just transcribe everything that is being said or on the presentation slide is quite high.

=== Outlining ===
Outlining is a common note-taking system. Notes and thoughts are organized in a structured, logical manner, reducing the time needed to edit and review, allowing a lot of information to be digested in a short period of time. For classes that involve many formulas and graphs, like mathematics or chemistry, a system such as Cornell Notes may be better.

Outlines generally proceed down a page, using headings and bullets to structure information. A common system consists of headings that use Roman numerals, letters of the alphabet, and Arabic numerals at different levels. A typical structure would be:

I. First main topic

A. Subtopic
1. point 1
2. point 2
3. point 3
B. Subtopic
1. point 1
2. point 2
3. point 3

II. Second main topic

A. Subtopic
1. point 1
2. point 2
3. point 3
B. Subtopic
1. point 1
2. point 2
3. point 3

However, this sort of structure has limitations in non-digital form since it is difficult to go back and insert more information. Adaptive systems are used for paper-and-pen insertions, such as using the reverse side of the preceding page in a spiral notebook to make insertions. Or one can simply leave large spaces in between items, to enable more material to be inserted. (For information about application software that supports outlining, see Category:Outliners.)

Computerized note-taking, whether with a word processor, outliner software, or a digital notebook program, allows note-takers to revise easily and add more entries or rows to the outline.

=== Sentence method ===
Sentence note-taking is simply writing down each topic as a short, simple sentence. This method works well for fast-paced lesson where a lot of information is being covered. The note-taker records every new thought, fact, or topic on a separate line. All information is recorded but is not organized into major and minor topics. Notes can be numbered or set off with bullets showing where a new thought begins.

== Non-linear note-taking ==
Approaches to non-linear note-taking include clustering, concept mapping, Cornell Notes, idea mapping, instant replays, Ishikawa diagrams, knowledge maps, learning maps, mind mapping, model maps, and the pyramid principle.

=== Charting ===
The charting method of note taking, which includes the drawing of tables sometimes called study frames, is useful for subject matter that can be broken into categories, such as similarities, differences, date, event, impact, etc. Students may use charting to identify categories and draw a table prior to a lecture or may review and rewrite notes using the charting method.

=== Mapping ===
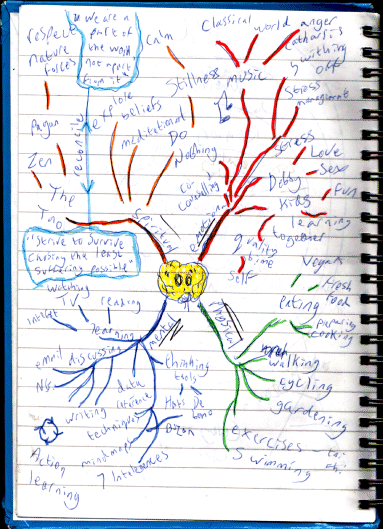
A mind map connects ideas together graphically

Mapping uses spatial organization and diagrams to assemble information. Ideas are written in a node–link structure, with lines connecting ideas together. Mind maps are drawn in a tree structure from a central point, purpose, or goal in the center of the page and then branch outward to identify all the ideas connected to that goal. Colors, small graphics, and symbols are often used to help to visualize the information more easily. It is also used for planning and writing essays.

=== Cornell Notes ===
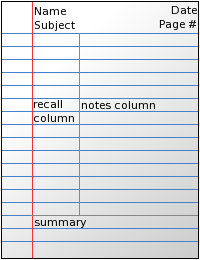
A diagram showing the three sections of a page of Cornell notes

The Cornell Notes method of note-taking was developed by Walter Pauk of Cornell University and promoted in his bestselling 1974 book How to Study in College. It is commonly used at universities today. The Cornell method consists of dividing a single page into three sections: a right-hand column for notes, a left-hand column for cues, and a strip at the bottom for a summary. Cues are key words or questions that help evoke key aspects of the topic. Cornell notes may be more effective for understanding concepts or producing readable notes, but studies have found that they had no significant effect on student performance.

=== SQ3R ===
SQ3R ("Survey, Question, Read, Recite, Review") is a method of taking notes from written material, though it might be better classified as a method of reading and gaining understanding. The reader skims the written material to produce a list of headings (Survey), which are then converted into questions (Question). The reader then considers the questions while reading to provide motivation for what is being covered (Read). The reader writes notes in sections headed by the questions (Recite), then writes a summary from memory and reviews the notes (Review).

Research shows that students who use the SQ3R strategy retain more information and achieve higher test scores.

An updated version called SQ4R, which adds a "Relate" step before "Review", has been used by some students since the early 1960s.

=== Guided notes ===
Sometimes lecturers may provide handouts of guided notes, which provide a "map" of the lecture content with key points or ideas missing. Students then fill in missing items as the lecture progresses. Guided notes may assist students in following lectures and identifying the most important ideas from a lecture. This format provides students with a framework, yet requires active listening (as opposed to providing copies of presentation slides in their entirety), and promotes active engagement during lecture or independent reading. The student ends up with full and accurate notes for use as a study guide.

Research suggests that guided notes improve student recording of critical points in lecture, as well as quiz scores on related content. In addition, an investigation carried out on students with learning problems showed that the use of the guided notes is an effective strategy to improve the performance of these students.

=== Card file ===
A card file uses individual notes on index cards (or their digital equivalent) that may be linked to each other through subject headings or other metadata such as numbers and tags.

== Electronic note-taking methods ==
The growing use of laptops in universities and colleges has led to a rise in electronic note-taking. Many students write their notes in word processors or prepare digital hand-written notes using a graphics tablet or tablet computer and styli or digital pens, with the aid of note-taking software. Online applications are receiving growing attention from students who can forward notes using email, or otherwise make use of collaborative features in these applications and can also download the texts as a file on a local computer. It has also become common for lecturers to deliver lectures using these and similar technologies, including electronic whiteboards, especially at institutes of technology.

Online note-taking has created problems for teachers who must balance educational freedom with copyright and intellectual property concerns regarding course content.

Multiple Artificial Intelligence guided note-taking websites have arisen during the modernized period. Instances include Turbo A.I., StudyCu, and Stydra. These websites, though they can provide multiple benefits for students, it raises concerns among professors about the use of A.I. and the dangling frontier it creates.

Electronic note-taking may be less effective than traditional methods of note-taking. A study done by Pam A. Mueller of Princeton University and Daniel M. Oppenheimer of the University of California, Los Angeles showed that students who take notes digitally retain less information than students who take notes on paper, and the digital note-takers have more difficulty remembering what they've written. However, there was also a study performed by Linlin Luo, Kenneth Kiewra, Abraham Flanigan, and Markeya Peteranetz presented evidence to support that electronic note-taking did show benefits in certain stages of learning as well. Electronic note-taking has created computer-aided distractions in class as multitasking on laptops is very easy to accomplish. However, this research only applies to typing notes on laptops, not writing on tablets.

== Professional services ==
Professional note-takers provide access to information for people who cannot take their own notes, such as some deaf and hearing impaired people. They most frequently work in colleges and universities, but are also used in workplace meetings, appointments, conferences, and training sessions.

== See also ==
- Bullet journal
- Diary
- Florilegium
- Forgetting curve
- Handwriting recognition
- Memorandum
- Penmanship
- Sketchnoting
- Study skills
- Category:Learning methods
- Comparison of note-taking software
  - List of concept- and mind-mapping software
- List of graphical methods
