= Edward Wheeler Scripture =

American physician

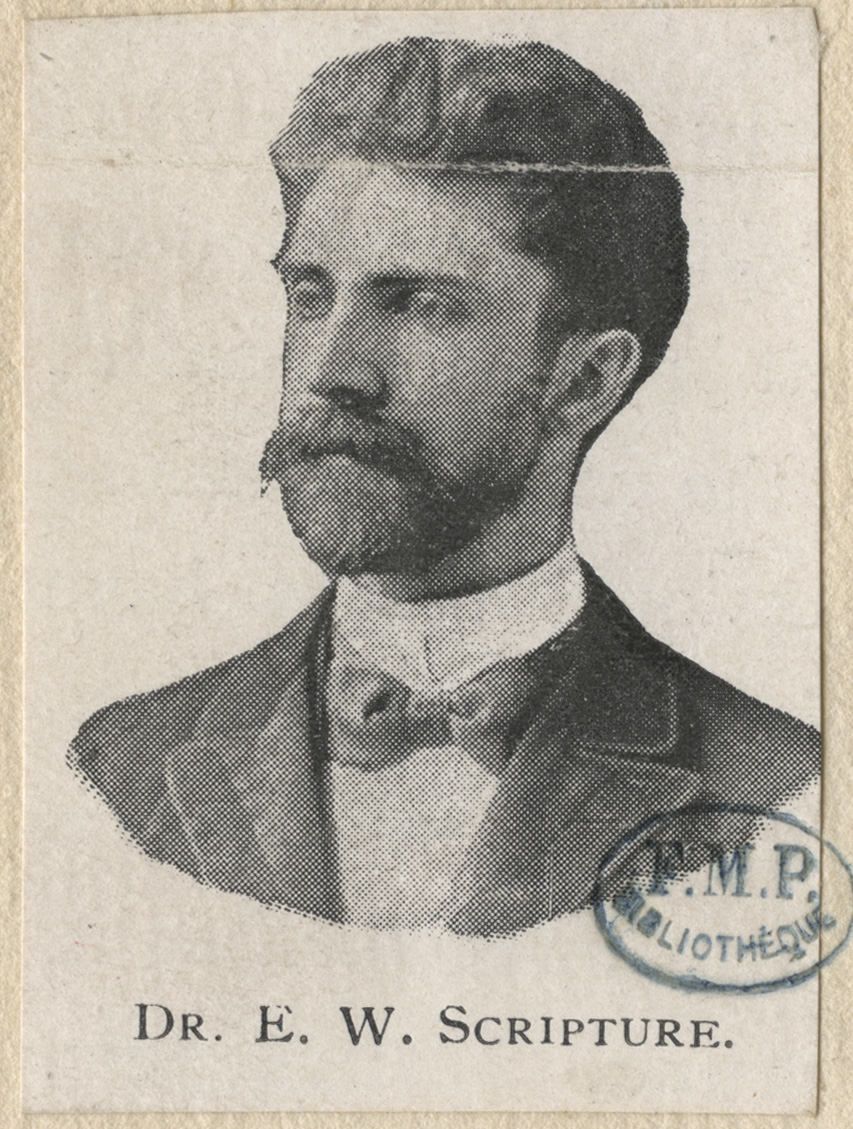
- Born: Edward Wheeler Scripture; May 21, 1864; Mason, New Hampshire
- Died: July 31, 1945 (aged 81); Henleaze, England
- Education: College of the City of New York; Ludwig-Maximilians-Universität München
- Spouse: May Kirk Scripture
- Scientific career
- Fields: Psychology; Speech science
- Workplaces: Clark University; Yale University; Columbia University; University of Vienna
- Doctoral advisor: Wilhelm Wundt
- Doctoral students: Carl Seashore

Edward Wheeler Scripture (21 May 1864 – 31 July 1945) was an American physician and psychologist. He founded the experimental psychology laboratory at Yale University, directed the Vanderbilt Speech Clinic at Columbia University and was a founder of the American Psychological Association. Trained under experimental psychology pioneer Wilhelm Wundt, Scripture became best known for his contributions to speech science.

== Biography ==
Edward Wheeler Scripture was born in Mason, New Hampshire on May 21, 1864. As a child, his family lived in New York City where he later completed his undergraduate education at the College of the City of New York in 1884. He met and married May Kirk in Berlin in 1890. The couple had three children. Scripture received a Dr. phil. from Leipzig University under his advisor Wilhelm Wundt. His graduate dissertation addressed the association of ideas.

After graduation from Leipzig, Scripture and his family returned to the United States in 1891 where he was hired as faculty by Granville Stanley Hall at Clark University. He continued working at Clark University for one year and then took a faculty appointment at Yale University. He established an experimental psychology laboratory at Yale where he and his wife conducted research on phonetics. While at Yale, Scripture developed a timer for studying reaction times known as a pendulum chronoscope, otherwise known as a pendulum timer. On July 8, 1892, Scripture along with Granville Stanley Hall co-founded the American Psychological Association. In 1902, Scripture received the first grant for experimental psychology from the Carnegie Institution in order to study the sounds of human speech. After a debate concerning the definition of the science of psychology with George Trumbull Ladd, Chair of the department, Scripture was fired from Yale in 1903. Ladd was also let go by Yale.

Scripture returned to Germany, where he earned a medical degree from the Ludwig-Maximilians-Universität München in 1906. After obtaining a Dr. med. he returned to America. In 1915, he took a position at Columbia University, where he studied the use of electric current as an anesthetic before shifting his focus to the study of speech and language. He later started a neurology laboratory and the Vanderbilt Speech Clinic at the Columbia Medical Center. May Scripture was an expert in language disorders herself, and she served as the director of speech correction at the Vanderbilt Clinic. May Scripture filed for separation from her husband, alleging that his laboratory assistant, Ethel King, had enticed her husband into a relationship. May Scripture also sued King for $50,000. May Scripture claimed that neither her husband nor King could be located. She also asserted that her husband had sold his office furniture before absconding. After the separation, May Scripture continued to work with Edward at the clinic.

Scripture traveled to London in 1919, where he began a speech clinic at West End Hospital for Nervous Diseases. In 1929, he left London for Vienna in order to accept a position in experimental phonetics at the University of Vienna. On July 31, 1945, Scripture died in Henleaze, England at the age of 81.

== Ideas ==
=== Association ===
During his time at the University of Leipzig, Scripture was primarily concerned with the nature of association. He conducted an experiment in which he had participants sit in a dark, quiet room. He then presented sensory stimuli. Each stimulus was present for four seconds. Following the presentation of stimuli, participants were asked to examine their own thoughts and describe the association. Given the evidence from his participants, Scripture was able to identify the four most simplified processes that occur in the act of association: preparation, influence, expansion, and after-effect.

While in the preparation stage, a participant becomes consciously aware of several ideas that are evoked by the stimulus. These ideas are competing for attention in consciousness. Influence occurs when an idea causes a change in consciousness. The third stage, expansion, occurs with the addition of ideas to an idea that is already present. After-effect includes thoughts about the nature of a certain association.

=== Speech science ===
While working at the speech clinic he established at the Columbia Medical Center, he saw patients with speech disorders such as stuttering and lisping. He described these speech disorders as lifelong tortures. He believed that these speech disorders resulted from emotional shocks and poor speech habits. In order to correct these speech problems, he combined psychoanalysis with voice exercises. He developed "the octave twist" method in which a patient would alter the pitch of their voice by one octave when articulating the stressed words. The object of the octave twist is to relax the speech producing muscles. Scripture believed that if any patient could learn to use the octave twist properly, it would be impossible to stutter.

== Works ==
- Thinking, Feeling, Doing (1895)
- The New Psychology (1897)
- The Elements of Experimental Phonetics (1902)
- How the Voice Looks (1902)
- Researches in Experimental Phonetics; The Study of Speech Curves (1906)
- Speech Defects and Voice Culture (1909)
- Stuttering and Lisping (1912)
- Manual of the Correction of Speech Disorders (1919)
- Stuttering, Lisping and Correction of the Speech of the Deaf (1923)
- Study of English Speech by New Methods of Phonetic Investigation (1919)
