= Carl Seashore =

American psychologist and educator (1866–1949)

Carl E. Seashore
- Carl Emil Sjöstrand
- Born: January 28, 1866; Mörlunda, Sweden
- Died: October 16, 1949 (aged 83); Lewiston, Idaho
- Education: Yale University
- Scientific career
- Fields: Psychology
- Workplaces: University of Iowa
- Doctoral advisors: Edward Wheeler Scripture, George Trumbull Ladd
- Doctoral students: George Kelly, Lee Edward Travis

Carl Emil Seashore, born Sjöstrand (January 28, 1866 – October 16, 1949) was a prominent American psychologist and educator. He was the author of numerous books and articles principally regarding the fields of speech–language pathology, music education, and the psychology of music and art. He served as Dean of the Graduate College of University of Iowa from 1908–1937. He is most commonly associated with the development of the Seashore Tests of Musical Ability.

== Background ==
Seashore was born in Mörlunda, Hultsfred Municipality, Kalmar County, Sweden, to Carl Gustav and Emily Sjöstrand. He emigrated with his family to the United States in 1870 at the age of 3 due to both economic and religious considerations and settled in Rockford, Iowa, before moving and settling in a farming community located in Boone County, Iowa. The name "Seashore" is a translation of the Swedish surname Sjöstrand. Seashore had two sisters and two brothers who were all educated in Swedish. His father, Carl Gustav Seashore, was a lay preacher and built a church, where Seashore began serving as the church organist at the age of 14.

He graduated from Gustavus Adolphus College in St. Peter, Minnesota, in 1891, having studied mathematics, music, classical languages and literature. Music was considered the "most important extracurricular activity in college" and he enjoyed singing at all sorts of collegiate occasions. During his years in college he served as the organist and choir director of a local Swedish-American Lutheran church and his salary there paid most of his college expenses. Seashore became a member of the Iowa Beta chapter of Sigma Alpha Epsilon.

Seashore attended Yale University when it had just opened the Graduate Department of Philosophy and Psychology. He studied under George Trumbull Ladd, professor of metaphysics and moral philosophy, and Edward Wheeler Scripture, an experimental psychologist who conducted research on phonetics. In 1877, Ladd had authored the standard American textbook Elements of Physiological Psychology. In 1895, Seashore was awarded the school's first Ph. D in psychology for his dissertation on the role of inhibition in learning.

After receiving his Ph.D. degree from Yale, Seashore spent the summer in Europe to visit different German and French psychology laboratories before returning to Yale University as a Fellow in Psychology and an assistant to Ladd. In 1897, he was offered a permanent position at Yale. Additionally, he was also offered an opportunity to go to China as a missionary teacher. However, he decided to return to his home state and spent the next fifty years as a researcher and an assistant professor of psychology at the University of Iowa. In 1908, Seashore was made Dean of the Graduate School at University of Iowa, where he maintained the position for nearly 30 years. He became president of the American Psychological Association in 1911 and presided over the 20th meeting in Washington, D.C.

== Career ==
In 1905, Seashore was made chairman of the Philosophy and Psychology Department and in 1908, he was made Dean of the Graduate School. He served for 40 years as Professor of Psychology and Chair of the Department of Psychology. He also served as Chairman of the Division of Anthropology and Psychology from 1933–1939. He helped found the Iowa Psychological Clinic in 1908 and later became president of the American Psychological Association in 1911. He went on to establish the Psychopathic Hospital at the University of Iowa, the Iowa Institute for Mental Hygiene, and the Gifted Student Project in 1915.

Seashore was interested in audiology, the psychology of music, the psychology of speech and stuttering, the psychology of the graphic arts and measuring motivation and scholastic aptitude. In particular, he was interested in the three perspectives of the psychology of music: the psychology of individual talent, the psychology of aesthetic feeling in musical appreciation and expression, and the psychology of the pedagogy of music. Seashore used standardized tests to objectively measure an individual's ability to perceive different dimensions of music and how musical aptitude differed between students. He devised the Seashore Tests of Musical Ability in 1919, a version of which is still used in schools in the United States. The test involved controlled procedures for measuring respondent's ability to discriminate pitch, loudness, tempo, timbre, and rhythm.

His interests in the fine arts led to a joint effort with Dr. Norman Charles Meier (1893-1967) and the publication of the Meier-Seashore Art Judgment Test in 1929. During the early 1930s, he received financial support for his research from the Bell Laboratories. Among the larger projects that he supervised was one at the Eastman School of Music with financial assistance from George Eastman. His complete publication list from 1893 to 1949 includes 237 books and articles. Given his interests in music and the arts, Seashore established some of the first graduate programs in the nation in the creative arts, especially music, theater, and the literary arts, where a student could obtain a doctorate with an artistic creation. He strived to incorporate experimental psychology and the scientific method into the fields of art and related subjects.

During his time at the University of Iowa, Seashore dedicated his career to education and research on the qualities of music perception and aesthetic talent. There, he also mentored several students that eventually became prominent psychological figures, such as Walter Richard Miles, Francis P. Robinson, Lee Edward Travis, and Joseph Harold Tiffin.

=== The Use of Vibrato in Music ===
Seashore dedicated some of his musical focus on understanding the perception of vibrato, or the pulsation of pitch, in music and its effects on the richness and vibrance of tone. He spent considerable time to measure, record, and define the function of vibrato in music. He described vibrato as "a basic phenomenon of nature" to provide the tone with richness and emotion. Seashore proposed using devices and measuring instruments to record musical patterns and analyze the frequency, pulsation, and occurrence of vibrato in music.

== Seashore Tests of Musical Ability ==
Seashore was influenced by the scientific work of James McKeen Cattell, a prominent psychologist and the founding editor of the American Journal of Psychology, and wanted to apply the methods of scientific psychology and mental testing to his research interest on musical aptitude and sensory perception differences in individuals. He insisted that "musical talent is subject to scientific analysis and can be measured." To perform such measurements, Seashore and his colleagues constructed various devices, including an audiometer, to measure auditory acuity. He went on to devise a set of measures in 1919 that involved controlled procedures for measuring a respondent's ability to discriminate pitch, loudness, tempo, timbre, and rhythm. Seashore incorporated complex machinery, systems of pulleys to generate reproducible pitches, and a special set of tuning forks to test pitch discrimination, dissonance, rhythm, melodic memory, and music intensity.

Seashore proposed that musical talent cannot be defined as a single construct, but is a product of an accumulation, or a hierarchy, of different musical traits. In order to classify the true nature of an individual's musical talent, a quantitative and qualitative analysis must be conducted on the individual's hierarchy of musical traits. He speculated that if an individual demonstrated difficulties in making comparison judgments between tonal pairs, the individual would probably not be capable of becoming a first-class musician as a performer, nor is he or she likely to find music as a source of pleasure as many others find it. Seashore also proposed that the appreciation and expression of music may be divided into four fundamental capacities: sensory (ability to hear music), motor (the ability to express music), associational (the ability to understand music), and affective (the ability to feel music and express feelings). With the four capacities of music, Seashore devised a battery that tested an individual's ability to process and understand music while also assessing musical traits such as absolute pitch, pitch discrimination, and tone deafness.

While creating the different tests of musical talents, he made sure that the tests were:

- Based on thorough analysis of musical talent
- Standardized for content that does not need to be changed
- Give quantitative results which may be verified
- Simple and nearly self-operating
- Adapted for group measurements
- Take into account practice, training, age, and intelligence

The test material were contained on five double-disk records that worked on any standard phonograph. Seashore recommended that the test should first be administered to children in the fifth grade and again in the eighth grade before children enter into elective courses in high school. The core subtests of the musical battery were created to assess five basic capacities of the musical mind:

- Sense of pitch: Hearing two tones and determining which one is higher.
- Sense of intensity: Hearing two tones of different loudness and determining which one is stronger.
- Sense of time: Hearing three clicks marking two intervals of time and determining which interval is longer.
- Sense of consonance: Hearing two combinations of two tones and determining which one sounds better (harmony).
- Tonal memory: Hearing a series of tones twice with the second playing having an adjusted note and identifying which note was changed.

Additional subtests were incorporated to measure other features of musical perception, including timbre, rhythm, musical memory, and emotional reactions and self-expressions in music. Teachers would also add qualitative information through ratings of brightness (estimate of the natural ability to do the work that the school requires under favorable conditions), singing (ability to sing as shown in public school music), and rhythmic action (child's ability to march, to skip, to dance, or take part in games requiring motor coordination).

Given the results of the battery, Seashore created a Talent Chart based on norms and percentile rank values for children in the fifth grade and eighth grade as well as adults. Each test would be normed and given a percentage value; the results would then be shown in a single graph or curve and would help convey an immediate representation of the features of musical traits or capacities of a specific individual.

The results in the inventory may serve to highlight areas of weaknesses and difficulty in music perception and training. Another aim of the battery was to identify musically talented students and to encourage them to pursue music. The inventory also serves to objectify the elements of musical appreciation and to shape the science, psychology, and art of music. The Seashore Tests of Musical Ability may also be implemented in elementary schools and used in group tests to identify gifted and talented musical individuals, to serve as a screening test for admissions into music-based schools, to pinpoint musical weaknesses, and to devise appropriate musical exercises in classroom settings. As Seashore's battery help predict relative successes and failures of elementary school students, he also created suitable instruments, such as a tonoscope to help identify the intonation of pitch and a rhythm meter to practice the synchronization of different rhythmic patterns, to allow students to practice and improve on areas of perceptual difficulties and musical training.

== Meier-Seashore Art Judgment Test ==
During his time at the University of Iowa, Seashore mentored and worked closely with Dr. Norman Charles Meier, who eventually became an associate professor in the psychology department. In 1929, Seashore and Meier published the Meier-Seashore Art Judgment Test, where subjects were asked to select the "better (more pleasing, more artistic, more satisfying)" from two pictures. The test booklet consisted of 125 pairs of pictures, each being an image and the same image altered "to lower its artistic existence". In principle, the test and discrimination of artistic aesthetics embody the features of objective measurement which have developed in the psychology of music talent and objectifies the systematic study of art judgment and art talent. According to Meier, aesthetic judgment is "one of the most important single factors in artistic competence" and argued that an art form takes on an aesthetic character when the parts are organized in accordance with universal principles that are found to exist in all good art. Similar to the Seashore Tests of Musical Ability, the aim of the test was to identify artistically gifted children and individuals who show evidence of aesthetic intelligence, creative imagination, and art talent.

Meier independently went on to develop the Meier Art Tests I: Art Judgment in 1940 and the Meier Art Tests: II. Aesthetic Perception in 1963 as successors of the Meier-Seashore Art Judgment Test and to continue measuring different dimensions of artistic aptitude.

== Iowa Child Welfare Research Station ==
Seashore helped supervise and promote the Iowa Child Welfare Research Station with Isaac Lea Hillis, the founder of the station, in 1918. Over the course of Seashore's supervision, the Iowa Child Welfare Research Station managed to garner over 1 million dollars from outside sources and issued over 1000 publications. The publications focused on research methods, nutrition, physical growth, mental growth, child behavior, pre-school education, parent education, and mental hygiene. The station became a national leader in the new fields of child development, child psychology, and intelligence testing.

== Personal life ==
In 1900, Seashore married Mary Roberta Holmes and had four sons. His oldest son, Robert Holmes Seashore, eventually became Professor of Psychology and Chairman of the Department of Psychology at Northwestern University.

Seashore spent the majority of his professional life at the University of Iowa, where he held the position of Dean of the Graduate School for 28 years. He retired in 1937 at the age of 70 but was recalled as Dean Pro Tempore of the Graduate School in 1942. After four years, he finally retired for the second time in 1946 at the age of 80.

== Honors ==
- Awarded Honorary Doctor of Science degree from Yale University in 1935
- Awarded Honorary Doctor of Musical Arts degree from the Chicago Musical College in 1939
- Elected to the National Academy of Sciences
- Member of the Acoustical Society of America
- Member of the American Musicological Society
- Honorary fellow of the British Psychological Society

== Selected works ==
- Elementary Experiments in Psychology (New York, H. Holt and Company, 1908)
- Psychology in daily life (New York, D. Appleton and co., 1913)
- The Measurement of Musical Talent (New York, G. Schirmer, 1915)
- The Psychology of Musical Talent (New York: Silver, Burdett and Company, 1919)
- Introduction to Psychology (New York, Macmillan, 1923)
- Approaches to the Science of Music and Speech (Iowa City, The University, 1933)
- Psychology of Music (New York, London, McGraw-Hill Book Company, Inc., 1938)
- Why we love music (Philadelphia, Oliver Ditson company, Theodore Presser co., distributors, 1941)
- In Search of Beauty in Music : a scientific approach to musical esthetics (New York, The Ronald Press Company, 1947)
