= Glenn C. Altschuler =

American historian and university administrator

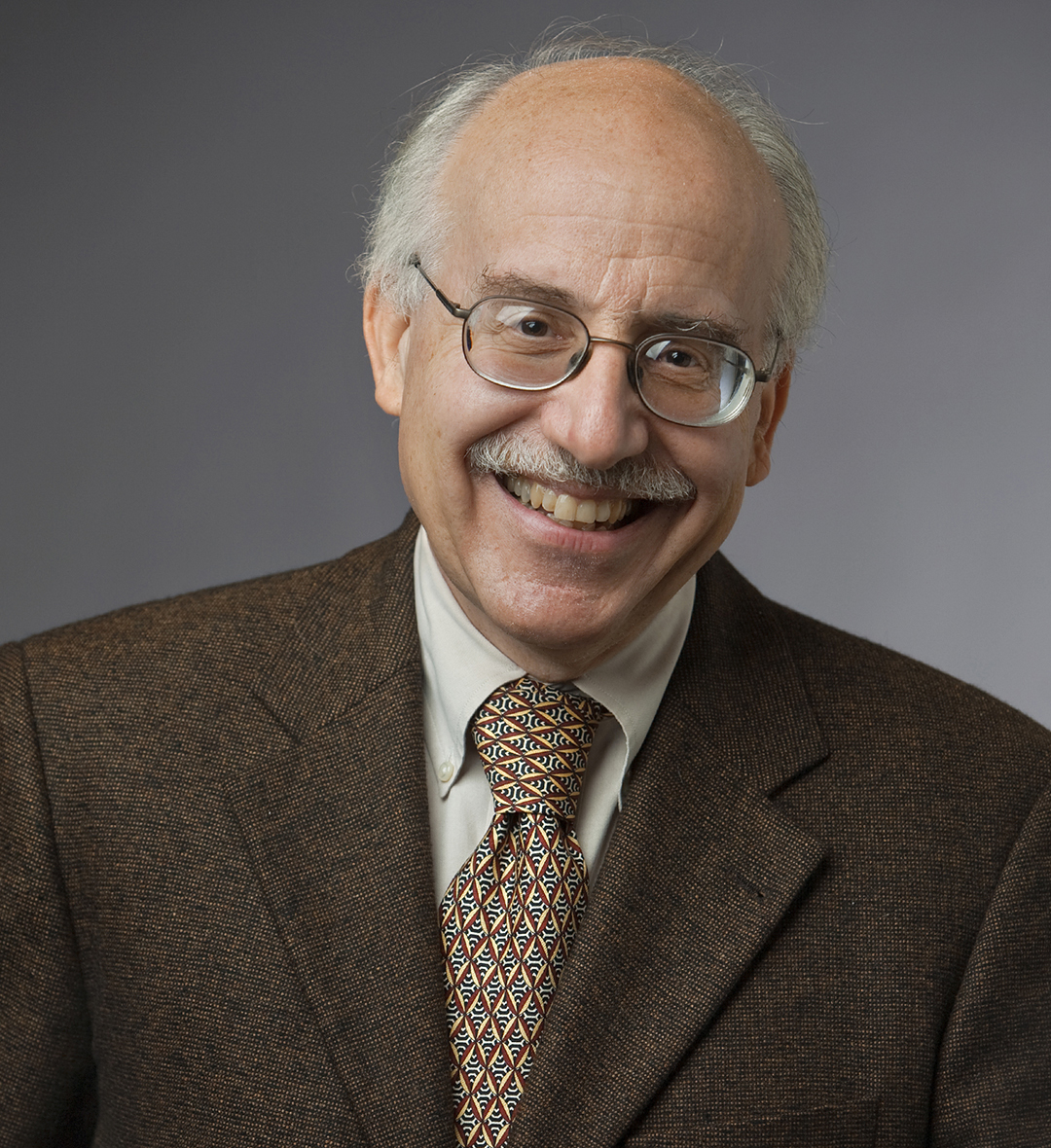
- Altschuler in September 2010
- Born: January 3, 1950 (age 76); Brooklyn, New York City, U.S.
- Occupations: writer, educator and university administrator

Academic background
- Education: Brooklyn College (BA), Cornell University (MA) (PhD)
- Thesis: Progress and Public Service: A Life of Andrew D. White (1976)
- Doctoral advisor: Michael Kammen

Academic work
- Discipline: American Studies
- Institutions: Ithaca College; Cornell University
- Website: https://history.cornell.edu/glenn-altschuler

Glenn Altschuler is an American writer, educator, administrator, and professor at Cornell University, where he is the Thomas and Dorothy Litwin Emeritus Professor of American Studies and a Weiss Presidential Fellow.

Altschuler has taught large lecture courses in American popular culture and has been a strong advocate for the value of humanities and for high-quality undergraduate teaching and advising. He is a subject-matter expert on Popular Culture, Politics, and Higher Education in the United States.

== Early life and education ==
Altschuler received his BA in history (Magna Cum Laude with Honors) from Brooklyn College in 1971, his MA from Cornell University in 1973, and his PhD in American history from Cornell in 1976.

== Career ==
Altschuler began his teaching career as a history professor at Ithaca College in 1975. In 1981, he joined Cornell University as an administrator and teacher and became noted for his work on the history of American popular culture. He believes that popular culture is "contested terrain", where economic classes and demographic groups struggle to make their marks on society. His year-long course in American Popular Culture was among the most popular at the university.

From 1991 to 2020, he served as Dean of the Cornell University School of Continuing Education and Summer Sessions. Altschuler also served as Cornell's vice president for University Relations from October 2009 to January 2014, with responsibilities for articulating and overseeing strategies related to communications, government relations, and land grant affairs. Additional positions included Chair of the Academic Advising Center (1983-1991), Associate Dean for Advising and Alumni Affairs (1986-1991), and Chair of Cornell's Sesquicentennial Commission (2012-2015).

Altschuler wrote a column on higher education for the quarterly Education Life section of The New York Times from 1999 through 2022 (see, for example, COLLEGE PREP; The -------- That Changed My Life). He was a regular panelist on national and international affairs From 2002 to 2005 for the WCNY television program The Ivory Tower Half-Hour. Altschuler has given lectures throughout the United States and in China, England, Ireland, Israel, Italy, and Russia. A collection of his papers is housed in the Cornell Library Division of Rare and Manuscript Collections.

He has written more than 2,000 scholarly essays, opinion pieces, book reviews, and articles for publishers including The Australian, Barron's Financial Weekly, The Chronicle of Higher Education, The Conversation US, Forbes, The Hill, Huffington Post, Inside Higher Ed, The Jerusalem Post, The New York Times, NPR ("Books We Love"), Psychology Today, The Wall Street Journal, and The Washington Post.

== Prizes, awards and honors ==
- Herbert H. Lehman Prize for Distinguished Scholarship in New York History, 2022, from the New York Academy of History

Cornell honors:

- The Clark Teaching Award
- The Donna and Robert Paul Award for Excellence in Faculty Advising
- The Kendall S. Carpenter Memorial Award for Outstanding Advising
- The Stephen H. Weiss Presidential Fellowship (2006)
- The Altschuler Faculty Study in Olin Library, and Altschuler Terrace (2008)

== Books ==
- Andrew D. White: Educator, Historian, Diplomat (Cornell University Press, 1979)
- Race, Ethnicity, and Class in American Social Thought, 1865-1919 (American History Series, John Hope Franklin and A. S. Eisenstadt, eds., Harlan Davidson, Inc., 1982)
- Revivalism, Social Conscience and Community in the Burned-Over District (co-authored with Jan M. Saltzgaber, Cornell University Press, 1983)
- Better Than Second Best: Love and Work in the Life of Helen Magill (University of Illinois Press, 1990)
- Changing Channels: America in TV Guide (co-authored with David I. Grossvogel, University of Illinois Press, 1992)
- Rude Republic: Americans and Their Politics in the 19th Century (co-authored with Stuart M. Blumin, Princeton University Press, 2000). Tyler Anbinder of The American Historical Review termed it "an original, thought-provoking, and persuasive book [and a] path-breaking study." In The Journal of American History, Philip J. Ethington wrote: "This is a genuine paradigm-shifting book about the nature of political participation in the nineteenth-century United States."
- All Shook Up: How Rock 'n Roll Changed America (Oxford University Press, 2003). In The Atlantic, Eric Alterman called the book "one of the first to do rock-and-roll the significant service of locating it within the cultural and political maelstrom it helped to create.”
- The 100 Most Notable Cornellians (co-authored with Isaac Kramnick and R. Laurence Moore, Cornell University Press, 2003)
- The GI Bill: A New Deal for Veterans (co-authored with Stuart M. Blumin, Oxford University Press, 2009)
- Cornell: A History, 1940–2015 (co-authored with Isaac Kramnick, Cornell University Press, 2014)
- Ten Great American Trials: Lessons in Advocacy (co-authored with Faust F. Rossi, American Bar Association, 2016)
- The Rise and Fall of Protestant Brooklyn: An American Story (co-authored with Stuart M. Blumin, Cornell University Press, 2022). Winner, New York Academy of History Herbert H. Lehman Prize, for the best book on New York published in 2022. Reviewer Jon Butler of The Gotham Center for New York City History described the book as "smoothly written, smartly analyzed, and deeply researched" and "a wonderfully satisfying book whose final sentences convey just how powerfully our past can illuminate our troubled present if we let it.” (A related essay in New York History, vol. 104, No. 1, “When Sunday Baseball Came to Brooklyn”, was the basis for the authors’ presentation at the Cooperstown Symposium on Baseball and American Culture in June 2023.
