= Free writing =

Writing technique

Free writing is traditionally regarded as a prewriting technique practiced in academic environments, in which a person writes continuously for a set period of time with limited concern for rhetoric, conventions, and mechanics, sometimes working from a specific prompt provided by a teacher. While free writing often produces raw, or even unusable material, it can help writers overcome writing blocks and build confidence by allowing them to practice text-production phases of the writing process without the fear of censure. Some writers use the technique to collect initial thoughts and ideas on a topic, often as a preliminary to formal writing.

Unlike brainstorming, where ideas are listed or organized, a free-written paragraph is comparatively formless or unstructured.

== History ==
Dorothea Brande was an early proponent of freewriting. In her book Becoming a Writer (1934), she advises readers to sit and write for 15 minutes every morning, as fast as they can. She argues that doing so for just 15 minutes helps writers to avoid having the feeling of commitment. Instead of believing that writing can become dull, writers can compromise for as little as 15 minutes to liberate ideas and put them on paper. She also argued that this practice would help authors to not fear blank pages when they start to write.

Peter Elbow advanced freewriting in his book Writing Without Teachers (1973). He pointed out the importance of writing as a liberating activity. Mentioning that when “freewriting” the author can break any restrictions they may have when writing. He pointed out that when writing in regular basics one is extremely focused on the mistakes and avoids certain words or ideas for fear. Instead, freewriting promotes writers to produce ideas more quickly because they forget to edit as they write.

The idea of freewriting has been popularized by Julia Cameron through her book The Artist's Way (1992). She presents the method of “morning pages” which demands that the author write three pages every morning to get ideas out. She saw this as a helpful technique to combat the blockages that writers may have.

== Technique ==
The technique involves continuous writing, usually for a predetermined period of time (often from five to fifteen minutes). The writer writes with no regards to spelling or grammar, and makes no corrections. If the writer reaches a point where they can't think of anything to write, it is presumed that they will continue to write about whichever ideas come to their mind. The writer is free to stray off topic and let thoughts lead where they may. At times, a writer may also perform a focused freewrite, letting a chosen topic structure their thoughts. Expanding from this topic, the thoughts may stray to make connections and create more abstract views on the topic. This technique helps a writer explore a particular subject before putting ideas into a more basic context.

Freewriting is often done on a daily basis as a part of the writer's daily routine. Also, students in many writing courses are assigned to do such daily writing exercises.

The writing does not have to be done with pen and paper. A technique known as free blogging combines blogging with free writing with the rules changed so that the writer does not stop typing for long periods of time. The end result may or may not be shared with the public.

The free writing technique emphasizes spontaneous, continuous expression, aiming to liberate thoughts and overcome writer's block, without concern for grammar or structure. This is different from David Bartholomae's approach to writing that emphasizes teaching students to engage critically with academic texts and discussions. This structured method focuses on helping students develop their ability to write well-argued and coherent academic papers, encouraging them to connect their work with existing scholarly literature.

== Evolution of free blogging ==
Free writing has evolved as online platforms and mediums have opened up. With sites like Tumblr in 2007 and Twitter in 2006, online traffic increased. While Tumblr usership has decreased, Twitter maintains one of the largest bases of users actively writing.

== Rationale ==
Free writing is based on a presumption that, while everyone has something to say and the ability to say it, the mental wellspring may be blocked by apathy, self-criticism, resentment, anxiety about deadlines, fear of failure or censure, or other forms of resistance. The accepted rules of free writing enable a writer to build up enough momentum to blast past blocks into uninhibited flow, the concept outlined by writing teachers such as Louise Dunlap, Peter Elbow, and Natalie Goldberg.

Free writing is about loosening the thought process, not about a product or a performance for a student or a writer.

== Use in education ==
Often free writing workshops focus on self-expression, and are sometimes even used in teaching elementary school children. There is no common consensus on the acceptance of this technique, often referred as Natalie Goldberg's first four rules of writing:

- The writer gives themselves a time limit, writing for one to twenty minutes and then stopping.
- The writer should keep their hands moving until the time is up. They should not pause to stare into space or to read what they have written. They should write quickly but not in a hurry.
- The writer should pay no attention to grammar, spelling, punctuation, neatness, or style. Nobody else needs to read what they have produced here. The correctness and quality of what is written does not matter; the act of writing does.
- If the writer gets off the topic or runs out of ideas, they should keep writing anyway. If necessary, they can write nonsense or whatever comes into their head, or simply scribble: anything to keep the hand moving.
- If the writer feels bored or uncomfortable as they are writing, they should ask themselves what is bothering them and write about that.
- When the time is up, the writer should look over what they have written, and mark passages that contain ideas or phrases that might be worth keeping or elaborating on in a subsequent free writing session.

Goldberg's rules appear to be based on those developed by Jack Kerouac, whom she cites several times. Kerouac developed 30 "rules" in his Belief & Technique for Modern Prose. While Kerouac's "rules" are elliptical and even cryptic for beginning writers, they are more comprehensive than Goldberg's for those who have practiced prose writing for some time. Kerouac supplemented these with his Essentials of Spontaneous Prose, and together they form the basis of his prose writing method, a form of narrative stream of consciousness. Kerouac himself cites the "trance writing" of William Butler Yeats as a precursor of his own practice.

Goldberg's rules, which are infused with the study and practice of Zen Buddhism, make the process of free writing more accessible for a beginner and are perhaps less extreme than those of Kerouac, although they are still tinged with an element of mysticism.

== Integration of problem-solving strategies into free writing ==
The concept of writing as a problem-solving process, as explored by Linda S. Flower and John R. Hayes, provides a framework for understanding free writing beyond its traditional context. This perspective suggests that free writing can serve as a foundational step in a multifaceted cognitive process that includes critical thinking and strategic planning. By incorporating problem-solving heuristics, writers can use free writing not only to generate raw material but also to transition those ideas into organized, coherent thoughts with clear objectives. This approach positions free writing as a dynamic and non-linear activity, offering strategies for writers to refine their content, tackle common writing challenges, and enhance their overall composition skills. Free writing is considered a technique within the iterative development process, valued for its potential to encourage creativity, enable personal expression, and contribute to the development of structured texts. This perspective expands the conventional understanding of free writing in educational and personal settings, suggesting a multifaceted role in writing practices.

Peter Elbow also emphasizes free writing as a crucial tool for facilitating both creative and critical thinking, highlighting its role in the writing process. Elbow's distinction between 'first-order' and 'second-order' thinking in writing showcases free writing as a tool that initially facilitates raw idea generation (first-order thinking) before refinement and analysis (second-order thinking).

There are several mental processes integral to writing, like goal setting, planning, and problem-solving. Free writing fits into this framework as a problem-solving technique by facilitating these processes in an unrestricted environment. This approach enables writers to explore ideas freely, potentially enhancing their ability to tackle writing challenges by tapping into their cognitive resources without the constraints typically associated with more structured writing tasks.

== Criticism ==
The effectiveness of free writing remains a disputed topic within the field of writing studies. Charles Piltch expressed concerns that the lack of time for preparation before writing may produce work that is not suitable for academic settings. Furthermore, Piltch notes that students who practice free writing are more reluctant to revise or edit their work and often produce insincere writing. Raymond Rodrigues argues that free writing minimizes the role of skilled instruction in writing studies and wrongfully equates fluid writing to good writing. The research presented in George Hillock's Research on Writing Composition states that although free writing is superior to emphasizing grammar and mechanics, using writing models with qualitative criteria produces the best writing.

David Bartholomae also criticizes free writing for its emphasis on personal voice at the expense of engaging with the broader academic discourse. He argues that this focus can prevent students from adequately preparing for the complexities of academic writing, which demands critical engagement with tradition, power, and authority. Bartholomae suggests that by prioritizing personal expression, free writing might limit students' ability to participate in academic conversations meaningfully.

== Personal Free Writes ==
Personal free writing is the practice of writing what one is thinking without considering organization or grammatical errors. In a study done by Fred McKinney, free writing was defined as letting one’s thoughts and words flow onto paper without hesitation. This can be done in the format of letters or even a personal notebook. Previous research suggests that personal free writing about emotional or traumatic events can lead to improvement in physical and emotional health. Studies done by James Pennebaker suggest privately free writing about emotions and past events for a few minutes every day may be beneficial to those that are healing from trauma or emotional disturbances. Past research implies free writing about emotional events may even be an effective form of therapy. Researchers even suggest that personal free writing in students is correlated to improvements in working memory.

Donald M. Murray positions free writing as a critical discovery tool within the writing process. Free writing plays a key role in this exploratory process of using language to uncover and articulate the meaning within one's experiences. It facilitates a dynamic interaction between the writer and their language, enabling them to experiment, reflect, and ultimately refine their ideas into coherent messages. Through free writing, writers can navigate the complexities of their thoughts, leading to clearer understanding and effective communication in all aspects of writing.

== See also ==
- Asemic writing
- Jack Kerouac
- Natalie Goldberg
- Stream of consciousness
- The Most Dangerous Writing App
