= Francis P. Robinson =

Francis Pleasant Robinson (December 21, 1906 – August 6, 1983) was an educational psychologist. As an educational psychologist, he spent his years teaching both college students and military personnel how to learn from textbooks.

== Background ==
Robinson was born in Danville, Indiana, on December 21, 1906, to Pleasant S. Robinson and Grace Z. Huron. He graduated from the University of Oregon in 1929. After graduating from college, he enrolled at State University of Iowa where he obtained his Master's of Art in 1930 and his Ph.D. in 1932. Robinson completed his Ph.D. dissertation under Carl E. Seashore. His dissertation was titled: "The role of eye movement in reading with an evaluation of techniques for their impairment". During his years in graduate school, he served as a research assistant from 1929 to 1932. He was in charge of individual counseling for how-to-study problems. He then taught education at the Stout Institute from 1933 to 1937 and served briefly as department chair. In 1937, Robinson went to Ohio State University as an assistant professor in the education psychology area to take responsibility for the How-to-Study program. Robinson remained at the Ohio State University as a professor until he retired in 1977. During his time at OSU, Robinson taught a summer semester at the University of British Columbia (1947), spring and summer semester at the American Council on Education and the Japanese Ministry in Education (1955), and a fall semester at the United Kingdom Educational Commission (1967).

== Career ==
Robinson's PhD was in experimental psychology. He went to OSU to take responsibility for the How-to-Study program. Robinson was aware of the benefits of small classes however such services were expensive. As a result, he created a dual program at OSU in which a few selected seniors in the College of Education provided remedial counseling assistance for freshman in the course. This dual program of counseling training and student remedial help was the basis of his paper titles, "Two Quarries with a single stone."

The How-to-study program at OSU was an outcome of a program developed by the army during WWII. Men selected for the Army Specialized Training Program (ASTP) were provided how-to-study training and data was collected on their actual study skills and habits. Robinson and colleagues used this data to create several higher-levels skills and strategies in reading, studying, and memory improvement. Robinson's SQ3R (survey, question, read, recite, and review) was created as part of the ASTP to help military personnel become better readers. Robinson's text, Effective Study (1946) outlined the SQ3R and emphasized higher level study skills. Additionally, the How-to-study program, provided assistance in "attacking the other problem areas which may be distracting a student in his university work; namely, vocational planning, social or personal problems, health problems, or lack of interest in school work" (p. 202). In the early 1940s, Robinson extended his efforts in training to graduate students and became limited to graduate students which resulted in a formal practicum course to be established at OSU. Thus creating an organized program for supervising counseling –in-training students. The development of graduate counselor training, recording supervision sessions, and other developments led Robinson to establish a new graduate program in the psychology department called Personnel Work which was later renamed Counseling Psychology program.

In 1946, Francis Robinson and Frank Fletcher were two of the founding members of the Division of Counseling and Guidance Psychologist (17) and also help establish the American Personnel and Guidance Association (APGA). In 1954, the Journal of Counseling Psychology was established with the help of Robinson and Fletcher. From 1954 to 1955, Robinson served as president of Division 17.

== Selected works ==
- The early days in developing the counseling psychology area at The Ohio State University (unpublished manuscript, 1982)
- Beyond Vocational Development (Journal of Counseling Psychology, 12,1965)
- Counseling psychology since the Northwestern Conference (New York, Teachers College Press, 1964)
- Transition and continuation (Journal of Counseling Psychology, 1964)
- Modern approaches to counseling "diagnosis"(Journal of Counseling Psychology, 1963)
- Study skills for superior students in secondary school (Read.Teach, 1961)
- Psychology in education (New York, Harper and Brothers, 1959)
- Differences in "degree of lead" among experienced counselors. (Journal of Counseling Psychology, 1954)
- The practicum training of counseling psychologist (American Psychologist, 1952).
- Principles and procedures in student counseling (New York, Harper and Brothers, 1950)
- Effective study (New York, Harper and Brothers, 1946)
- Two quarries with a single stone (Journal of Higher Education, 1945)
- Psychology and the new education (New York, London, Harper and Brothers Publishers, 1944)

== Professional development ==
- Fellow of APA Division 15 (Educational Psychology) and Division 17 ( Counseling Psychology)
- 1941: President, Ohio Psychological Association, Executive Committee Member Division 15
- 1954-1955: Executive Committee Member Division 17; Member of APA Council of Representative; Member of APA Board of Directors; Consulting Editor, Personnel and Guidance Journal; Acting Managing Editor and Editor, Journal of Counseling Psychology

== Personal life ==
Robinson married Carolyn Gertrude Bostwick August 1931 and had two children. Carolyn died in 1975. He married Bonnie Lou in 1976. Frank Robinson died in Leesburg, Florida in 1983, aged 76.
