= Drafting (writing) =

Process to create preliminary versions of a written work

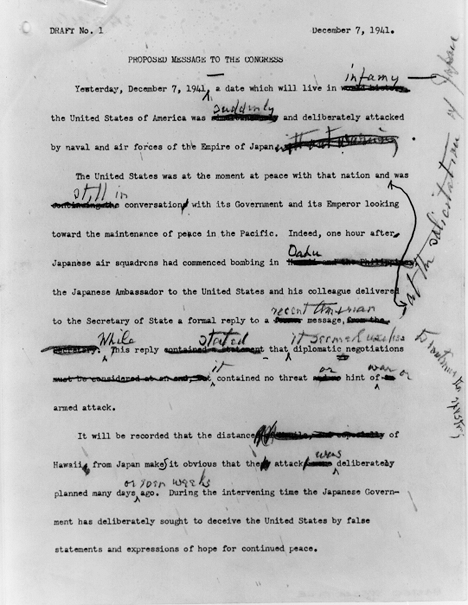
A draft of Franklin D. Roosevelt's Infamy Speech, including the President's handwritten annotations.

Drafting is the process by which preliminary forms of a written work are composed. Separate from other steps of the writing process, such as revision and editing, drafting involves the initial creation of the main content, structure, and style of a work. The preliminary forms of a written work are referred to as draft documents or simply drafts. Drafting is the very first step of the writing process; it gives the writer a base to expand and improve upon their work via later steps.

Drafting almost always involves rounds of cumulatively adding onto and expanding a work. The initial complete draft is known as the first draft or rough draft. Typically, 'snapshots' of the draft at certain points are taken, these snapshots often being called the drafts; alternatively, the work as it currently is can be referred to as the draft. This distinction is unclear. In an essay writing environment, such as school, drafting often involves rounds of individual brainstorming, collecting evidence, and writing individual paragraphs, along with deciding on the approach to which the essay is written.

== Method ==
Drafting relies primarily on free writing to operate. While drafting, a writer is generally not immediately concerned with grammar or spelling but rather getting their ideas into the page in a physical form. As such, a writer's first draft may not even be prose; it could potentially be a list of disconnected ideas or phrases. Writer's block is commonly considered to be a major roadblock in the drafting process.
