= SQ3R =

Reading comprehension method

SQRRR or SQ3R is a reading comprehension method named for its five steps: survey, question, read, recite, and review. The method was introduced by Francis P. Robinson in his 1941 book Effective Study.

The method offers a less passive approach to reading textbook material. Similar methods include PQRST and KWL table.

== Process ==
1. Survey ("S")
  The first step, survey, skim, or scan advises that one should resist the temptation to read the book and instead first go through a book looking for its structure. In How to Read a Book, Adler refers to this as 'Inspectional Reading'. He suggests first reading through the table of contents, chapter headings and sub-headings, as well as summary paragraphs at the start and end of each chapter to understand the author's main arguments. This survey step typically only takes 3–5 minutes, but it provides an outline or framework for what will be presented. The reader should identify ideas and formulate questions about the content of the chapter.
2. Question ("Q")
  Generate questions about the content of the reading. For example, convert headings and sub-headings into questions, and then look for answers in the content of the text. Other more general questions may also be formulated:
  - What is this chapter about?
  - What question is this chapter trying to answer?
  - How does this information help me?
3. Read (R^{1})
  Use the background work done with "S" and "Q" to begin reading actively. This means reading to answer the questions raised under "Q". Passive reading, in contrast, results in merely reading without engaging with the study material.
4. Recite (R^{2})
  The second "R" refers to the part known as "Recite." The reader should try to recite from memory what was learned in the same manner as telling someone else about the information. The reader must use their own words to formulate and conceptualize the material. Try recalling and identifying major points (heading/subheadings) and answers to questions from the "Q" step. This recital step may be done either in an oral or written format and is related to the benefits of retrieval (testing effect) in boosting long-term memory for the material.
5. Review (R^{3})
  The final "R" is "Review." Once you reach the end of the passage, review the material by repeating back to yourself what the point of the passage is, using your own words. You may then repeat the process on the second set of questions.

== See also ==
- Cornell Notes
- KWL table
- Francis P. Robinson
- Pareto principle
- PQRST (study skill)
- Spaced repetition
- Speed reading
- Study skills
