= Write or Die =

Word processor website

Write or Die is an online web application designed to combat writer's block by letting users of the application punish themselves if they slow down or stop typing in the application's window. How severe the punishments are depends on the mode the user chooses, which ranges from "Gentle" to "Kamikaze". It was reviewed by publications PCWorld, the Los Angeles Times and The Guardian, and it was most notably used by writers Helen Oyeyemi and David Nicholls. The creator, Jeff Printy, explained that he wrote the application because he wants "to be published and make a living as a writer."

== See also ==
- NaNoWriMo
- The Most Dangerous Writing App
