= The Most Dangerous Writing App =

Web application

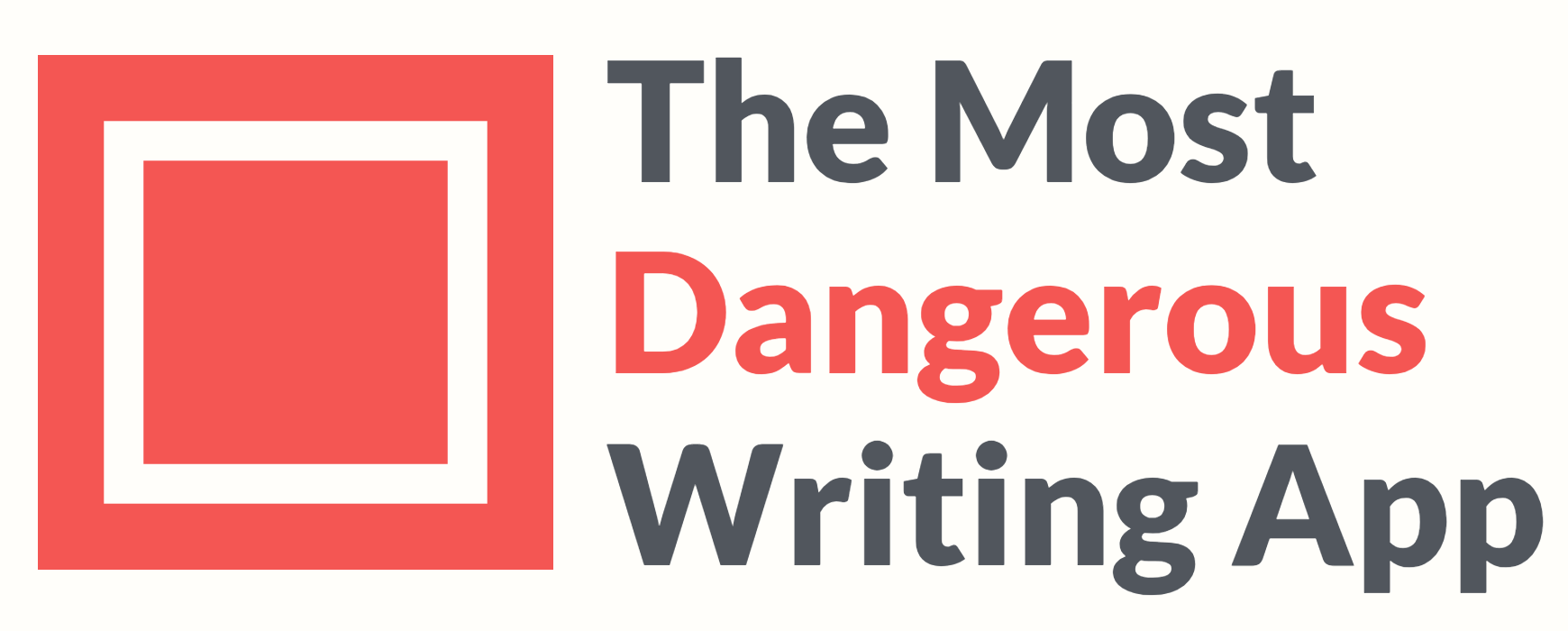
- Developer: Manuel Ebert
- Stable release: 2.3 / 2019-05-08
- Platform: Web application
- Type: Text editor
- License: GNU General Public Licence
- Website: www.squibler.io/dangerous-writing-prompt-app

The Most Dangerous Writing App is a web application for free writing that combats writer's block by deleting all progress if the user stops typing for five seconds. It is targeted at creative writers who want to write first drafts without worrying about editing or formatting.

== Features ==
The app is designed to "shut down your inner editor and get you into a state of flow", referring to the psychological concept of being in a flow state.

Users start a writing session by choosing a time or word limit, and can only save or download their work if they complete the set limit without interruption. An optional "hardcore mode" blurs out everything the user has written so far, making it impossible to edit before finishing the writing session.

== History ==
The Most Dangerous Writing App was created by software engineer Manuel Ebert and was released as free, open source software on February 29, 2016. It was reviewed by Wired, Forbes, Vogue, Huffington Post, The Verge, The Next Web, and others. It has been used in free writing contests and is recommended by NaNoWriMo.

In April 2019, The Most Dangerous Writing App was acquired by Squibler, but the original version remains freely accessible.

== See also ==
- Write or Die
