= Sequence Organizers =

Sequence organizers are a type of graphic organizer that help students to see the sequential relationship between events in a text. They can show a process or portray an event sequence in a simplified manner. They can help students identify cause-and-effect relationships. A graphic organizer can be also known as a knowledge map, a concept map, a story map, a cognitive organizer, an advance organizer, or a concept diagram. They are used as a communication tool to employ visual symbols to express knowledge, concepts, thoughts or ideas, and the relationships between them.

== Types ==
- Topic or knowledge maps visually depict where items of information exist.
- Concept maps illustrate relationships between two or more concepts.
- Story maps identify the elements of a story and the main storyline.
- Webs show how information categories relate to one another.
- Mind maps visually represent central ideas surrounded by connected topics and subtopics.

== Teaching ==
When students read a text that outlines a story, process or series of events, it can be useful to put the information in a sequence. Breaking down information into sections can make it easier to understand as a whole. Moreover, large pictures help emphasize the core meaning along with practical demonstrations. A graphic organizer can be used as a teaching tool in two ways:

- From graphic organizer to text – A completed sequence organizer is used to create a piece of writing based on the information it contains.
- From text to graphic organizer – A sequence organizer is used to simplify, in note form, events in a sequential order. This is often used by teachers to check student's comprehension of a text.

=== More ideas ===
Students who need more help can be provided with key events already written in the left hand arrows.

If students are reading different sections of the same text, such as a jigsaw activity, they should complete a particular portion of their organizer. When the classmates assemble, they can exchange their portions to make notes of important information of other sections.

Organizers can be used as a platform to prepare a rough draft for a narrative text, or a summarize review of sequential information from more than one textual source or learning experience.
