= Graphic organizer =

Pedagogical tool

A graphic organizer, also known as a knowledge map, concept map, story map, cognitive organizer, advance organizer, or concept diagram, is a pedagogical tool that uses visual symbols to express knowledge and concepts through relationships between them. The main purpose of a graphic organizer is to provide a visual aid to facilitate learning and instruction.

== History ==
Graphic organizers have a history extending to the early 1960s. David Paul Ausubel was an American psychologist who coined the phrase "advance organizers" to refer to tools which bridge "the gap between what learners already know and what they have to learn at any given moment in their educational careers." Ausubel's advance organizers originally took the form of prose to merge the familiar—what students know—with the new or unfamiliar—what they have discovered or are learning. The advance organizer intended to help learners more easily retain verbal information but was written in a higher level of language. Later the advance organizers were represented as paradigms, schematic representations, and diagrams as they took on more geometric shapes.

In 1969, Richard F. Barron came up with a tree diagram that was referred to as a "structured overview." The diagram introduced new vocabulary and used spatial characteristics and language written at the same level as the material being learned. In the classroom, this hierarchical organization was used by the teacher as a pre-reading strategy to show relationships among vocabulary. Its use later expanded for not only pre-reading strategies but for supplementary and post-reading activities. It was not until the 1980s that the term graphic organizer was used.

== Theories ==
Various theories have been put forth to undergird the assimilation of knowledge through the use of graphic organizers. According to Ausubel's Subsumption Theory, when a learner connects new information to their own preexisting ideas, they absorb new information. By relating new information to prior knowledge, learners reorganize their cognitive structures rather than build an entirely new one from scratch. Educational psychologist Richard E. Mayer reinterpreted Ausubel's subsumption theory within his own theory of assimilation encoding. In applying the use of organizers to the assimilation theory, advance organizers facilitate prior knowledge to working memory as well as its active integration of received information. However, he warned that advance organizers are not beneficial if the tools do not ask the learner to actively incorporate new information or if the preceding teaching methods and materials already are well-defined and well-structured.

Others find a basis for graphic organizers on schema theory developed by Swiss psychologist Jean Piaget. In psychology, schema refers to a cognitive framework or concept that helps to organize and interpret information. The brain uses these patterns of thinking and behavior that are held in long-term memory to help people interpret the world around them. Piaget's theory is that a scheme is both a category of knowledge and the process of acquiring new knowledge. He believed that as people continually adapt to their environments, they take in new information and acquire additional knowledge. Culbert, et al. (1998) posits that by using graphic organizers, prior knowledge is activated, and learners can add new information to their schema and thus improve comprehension of the material.

== Application ==
=== Pre-writing tool for students with learning disabilities ===
In one study of 21 students on Individualized Education Plans, graphic organizers were used during the pre-writing process to gauge student achievement on the persuasive essay in a 10th grade writing classroom. Explicit instruction on how to fill out the organizer along with color coding sections and sufficient class time to fill these out resulted in an 89 percent of students saying they felt graphic organizers were helpful in a post-assignment survey.

=== Metacognition tool for second-language (L2) learners ===
One yearlong study of 3rd and 5th grade California dual language classrooms found that through the use of graphic organizers, students increased higher-order thinking skills, enhanced vocabulary acquisition, and developed the academic language of science.

== Types of organizers ==
Graphic organizers take many forms:

Ishikawa's cause and effect diagram (fishbone chart)

- Relational organizers
  - Storyboard
  - Fishbone - Ishikawa diagram
    - Cause and effect web
  - Chart
    - T-Chart
- Category/classification organizers
  - Concept mapping
  - KWL tables
  - Mind mapping
- Sequence organizers
  - Chain
  - Ladder - Story map
  - Stairs - Topic map
- Compare contrast organizers
  - Dashboard
  - Venn diagrams
  - Double bubble map
- Concept development organizers
  - Story web
  - Word web
  - Circle chart
  - Flow chart
  - Cluster diagram
  - Lotus diagram
  - Star diagram
- Options and control device organizers
  - Mechanical control panel
  - Graphical user interface

== Enhancing students' skills ==
A review study concluded that using graphic organizers improves student performance in the following areas:

Retention
Students remember information better and can better recall it when it is represented and learned both visually and verbally.

Reading comprehension
The use of graphic organizers helps improving the reading comprehension of students.

Student achievement
Students with and without learning disabilities improve achievement across content areas and grade levels.

Thinking and learning skills; critical thinking
When students develop and use a graphic organizer their higher order thinking and critical thinking skills are enhanced.

== Criticism ==
In four studies on the effects of advance organizers on learning tasks, no significant difference was found from the control group who did not use organizers to learn as presented in a paper Richard F. Barron delivered to the Annual Meeting of the National Reading Conference in 1980. In that same study, Richard F. Barron did find that student-constructed postorganizers showed more benefits. Graphic postorganizers focus on learners finding the relationships of vocabulary terms by manipulating them in a diagram or schematic way after they have already learned these terms.

== See also ==
- Diagram
- Four square writing method
- KWL table
- Thinking Maps
- Visualization (graphic)
