= Natalie Goldberg =

American writer (born 1948)

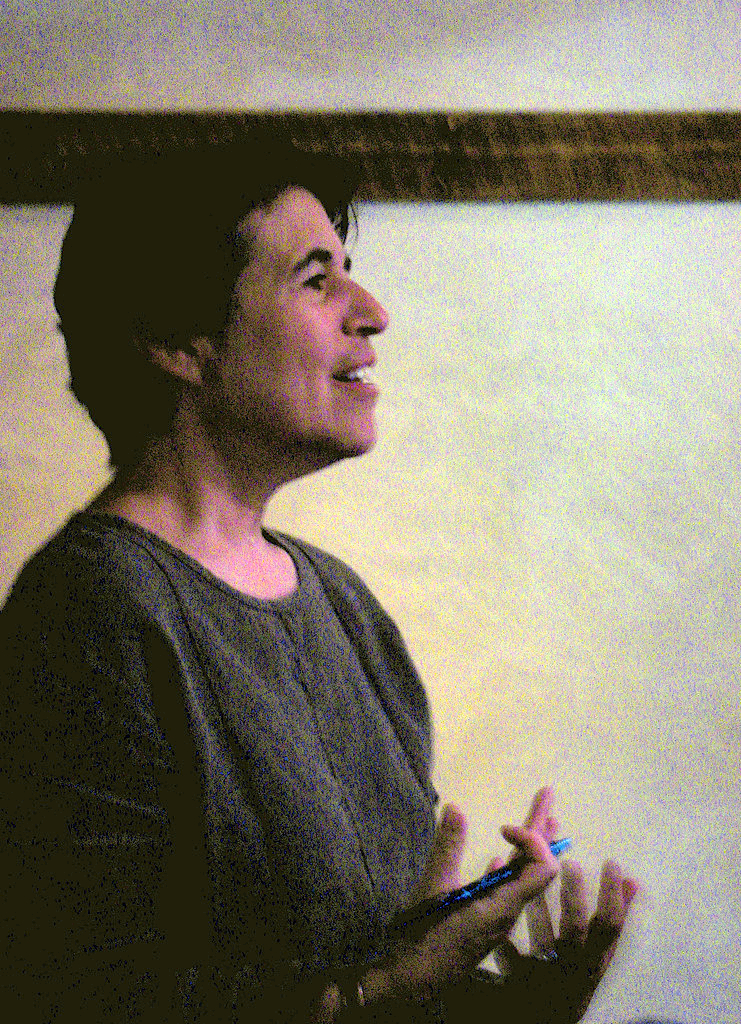
- Born: January 4, 1948 (age 78); Brooklyn, New York, U.S.
- Occupations: Writer, teacher, Zen practitioner

Natalie Goldberg (born January 4, 1948) is an American popular author and speaker. She is best known for a series of books which explore writing as Zen practice.

== Life ==
Goldberg has studied Zen Buddhism for more than thirty years and practiced with Dainin Katagiri Roshi for six years. Goldberg is a teacher who lives in Santa Fe, New Mexico. Her 1986 book Writing Down the Bones sold over two million copies and is considered an influential work on the craft of writing. Her 2013 book, The True Secret of Writing, is a follow-up to that work.

== Books ==
- Chicken and in Love (1979), ISBN 978-0-930100-04-9
- Writing Down the Bones (1986), ISBN 0-87773-375-9
- Wild Mind: Living the Writer's Life (1990)
- Long Quiet Highway: Waking Up in America (1993)
- Banana Rose (1995)
- Living Color: A Writer Paints Her World (1997)
- Thunder and Lightning (2000)
- The Essential Writer's Notebook (2001)
- Top of My Lungs (2002)
- The Great Failure (2004)
- Old Friend From Far Away: The Practice of Writing Memoir (2008), ISBN 978-1-4165-3502-7
- The True Secret of Writing (2013)
- The Great Spring: Writing, Zen, and This Zigzag Life (2016), ISBN 978-1-61180-316-7
- Let the Whole Thundering World Come Home: A Memoir (2018), ISBN 978-1611805673
- Three Simple Lines: A Writer's Pilgrimage into the Heart and Homeland of Haiku (2021), ISBN 978-1608686971
- Writing Down the Bones Deck: 60 Cards to Free the Writer Within (2021), ISBN 978-1611809008
- Writing on Empty: A Guide to Finding Your Voice (2024), ISBN 978-1250342546
