= Cornell Notes =

Note-taking system developed at Cornell University

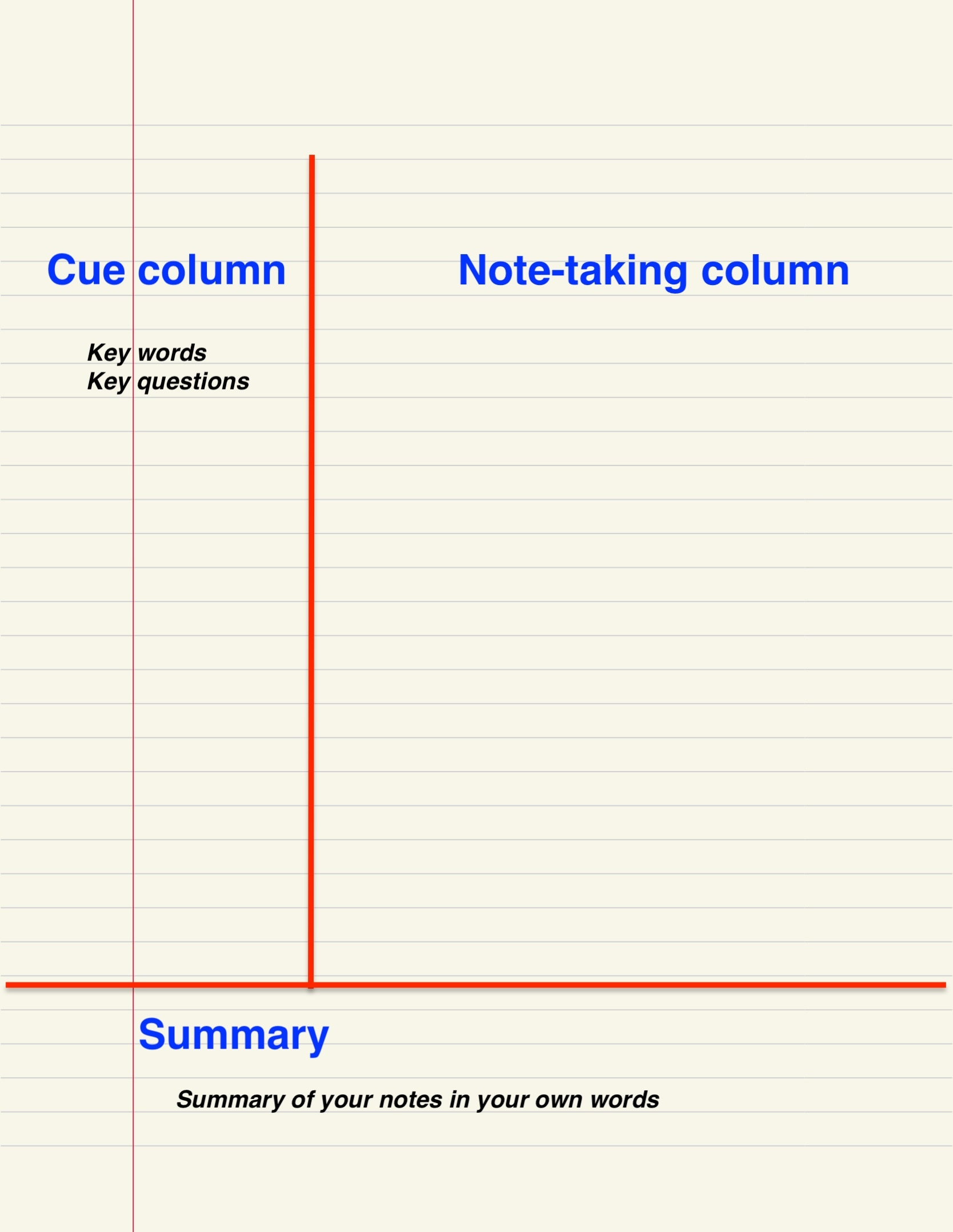
Cornell note system

The Cornell Notes system (also Cornell note-taking system, Cornell method, Cornell way or just Cornell notes) is a note-taking system devised in the 1950s by Walter Pauk, an education professor at Cornell University. Pauk advocated its use in his best-selling book How to Study in College.

== Overview ==
The Cornell method provides a systematic format for condensing and organizing notes. This system of taking notes is designed for use by a high school or college level student. There are several ways of taking notes, but one of the most common is the "two-column" notes style. The student divides the paper into two columns: the note-taking column (usually on the right) is twice the size of the questions/keyword column, which is on the left. The student leaves five to seven lines open, or about two inches (5 cm), at the bottom of the page.

Notes from a lecture or text are written in the note-taking column; notes usually consist of the main ideas of the text or lecture, and longer ideas are paraphrased. Long sentences are avoided; symbols or abbreviations are used instead. To assist with future reviews, relevant questions or keywords (which should be recorded as soon as possible, so that the lecture and questions will be fresh in the student's mind) are written in the left-hand keyword column. These notes can be taken from any source of information, such as fiction books, DVDs, lectures, or textbooks, etc.

When reviewing the material, the student can skim the note-taking (right) column while answering the questions/keywords in the key word or cue (left) column. The student is encouraged to reflect on the material and review the notes regularly.

== Studies on effectiveness ==
While Cornell note-taking is frequently advocated in educational literature, empirical evidence regarding the impact of the system on learner retention and student performance remains inconclusive.

On one hand, multiple studies support the benefits of the system. A study published in 2023 at Al Baha University compared two groups with one trained on Cornell note-taking and found improved performance. One study published in 2023 found a positive effect on nursing students who were taught the Cornell note-taking system. A study published in 2010 by Wichita State University compared two note-taking methods in a secondary English classroom, and found that the Cornell note-taking style may be of added benefit in cases where students are required to synthesize and apply learned knowledge, while the guided notes method appeared to be better for basic recall.

However, many other studies report limited or no significant impact on student performance. A 2013 study found that while students instructed in Cornell Notes (CN) produced qualitatively better notes, this did not correspond to higher achievement results; the researchers reported "no significant difference between the intervention and base classes on achievement." Similarly, a 2023 study involving high schoolers determined there was "no difference in student-choice note-taking and Cornell note-taking on student performance in a high school Family and Consumer Sciences class". Additionally, a 2016 doctoral thesis by Baharev Zulejka reported that 8th-grade students using Cornell Notes produced notes with slightly greater word counts but containing fewer key points compared to controls, and identified no statistically significant improvement in their comprehension test scores.

== See also ==
- Note-taking
