= KWL table =

Graphical organizer to help in learning

A KWL table, or KWL chart, is a graphical organizer designed to help in learning. The letters KWL are an acronym, for what students, in the course of a lesson, already know, want to know, and ultimately learn. It is a part of the constructivist teaching method where students move away from what are considered traditional methods of teaching and learning. In this particular methodology the students are given the space to learn by constructing their own learning pace and their own style of understanding a given topic or idea. The KWL chart or table was developed within this methodology and is a form of instructional reading strategy that is used to guide students taking them through the idea and the text. A KWL table is typically divided into three columns titled Know, Want and Learned. The table comes in various forms as some have modified it to include or exclude information.

It may be useful in research projects and to organize information to help study for tests.

== Classroom introduction ==
The KWL chart was created by Donna Ogle in 1986. A KWL chart can be used for all subjects in a whole group or small group atmosphere. The chart is a comprehension strategy used to activate background knowledge prior to reading and is completely student centered. The teacher divides a piece of chart paper into three columns. The first column, 'K', is for what the students already know about a topic. This step is to be completed before the reading. The next column, 'W', is for students to list what they want to learn about the topic during the reading. This step is also to be completed before the reading. The third column, 'L', is for what the students learned from the reading. This step, of course, is done after finishing the reading. The KWL chart can also be used in reading instruction at the beginning of a new unit.

Here is what the KWL chart can look like:

K What I know	W What I wonder	L What I learned
Write the information about what the students know in this space.	Write the information about what the students want to know in this space.	After the completion of the lesson or unit, write the information that the students learned in this space.

=== Implementation considerations ===
Materials required can vary on the type of classroom activity the teacher intends to carry. For a classroom activity if the teacher divides the class for a particular topic then 1 paper with KWL chart per group shall be given. But if the teacher wants every individual child to brainstorm on the given topic then every individual shall have their own student paper copy.

In the 'K' column, the teacher has to make sure that she or he has all the questions ready for the students to brainstorm on the particular idea that needs to be taken care in that class. The questions help the students to be prompted to think in specific directions that will lead them to the first step of brainstorming. Also ask the students the reason of their answers. By this the teacher makes them aware of their associations to the answers. The questions like "what made you think like that?" shall guide them well. In the 'W' column, ask associating questions or liking questions to make them come to the thinking. questions like, "what would you like to learn more about this idea?" can help them to analyze and think more. The teacher here has to come prepared with her/his own set of questions that will link the students' questions to the idea in the text. This is done so that the student shall not lose the flow of the text as well as not lose the purpose of the activity. In the last column 'L', help the students to come out with their own creative ideas and analysis. Also in this particular column, the teacher shall ask the students to differentiate between the answers to their questions and ideas in other columns and the idea they found interesting. At last, the teacher shall help the students to consult other sources which would answer their questions which are not mentioned in the text.

A KWL chart can be used to drive instruction in the classroom. The teacher can create lesson plans based upon the interests and inquiries of the students and their needs. Using this strategy can increase motivation and attention by activating the students' prior knowledge. This allows the teacher to understand the students' prior knowledge and the students' interests in the topic.

== Purpose ==
A teacher has many reasons for using KWL charts in the classroom. First, a KWL chart activates students' prior knowledge of the text or topic to be studied. By asking students what they already know, students are thinking about prior experiences or knowledge about the topic. Next, KWL charts set a purpose for the unit. Students can add their input to the topic by asking them what they want to know. Students then have a purpose for participating and engaging in the topic. Also, using a KWL chart allows students to expand their ideas beyond the text used in the classroom. By being aware of students' interests, the teacher has the ability to create projects and assignments that the students will enjoy. A KWL chart is a tool that can be used to drive instruction as well as guide student learning. KWL charts are used by elementary teachers from literature to science. They are also used to teach historical content at the elementary level.

=== Study tool ===
A KWL chart can be used as a study tool for an individual, group, or entire class. It is a way to synthesize information into a visual aid. The students are also able to keep track of what they have done and what they still would like, or need to do.

=== Required materials ===
Materials required can vary on the type of classroom activity the teacher intends to carry. For a classroom activity if the teacher divides the class for a particular topic then one paper with a KWL chart per group shall be given. But if the teacher wants every child to brainstorm on the given topic, they shall have their own student paper copy.

=== Specific learners ===
KWL charts can be used with all students, however, there are specific groups of students that lend themselves quite well to this strategy, including visual learners, young learners, or ESL learners. As the chart is a graphic organizer it can aid visual learners. The information is presented in a user-friendly way that is visually accessible. Due to the visual nature of the KWL chart it can also be beneficial for young learners such as preschoolers. Words may not be necessary, and pictures can be used to express the chart's ideas. As pictures can be used alone or in conjunction with words, the KWL chart may assist students learning a second language.

== Adaptations ==
There are various adaptations of KWL charts that can be used within the classroom.

=== Hill ===
One adaptation as created by Hill is an extension of the traditional KWL chart to include a column for "Further Wonderings" at the end of the table. This allows for the students' knowledge to continue beyond what they have learned within the classroom. The idea behind this extra column is to encourage the students to continue to learn.

=== KLEW ===
Another adaptation of the KWL chart is the KLEW chart. The KLEW chart was developed by a group of people with various backgrounds including an elementary school teacher, a professor and a professional development specialist. Within this chart, the "K" stands for what students know of a topic, the "L" for what is being learned, the "E" for evidence that supports the learning previously described, and the "W" for wondering, which leaves room for further questions. This table differs from the traditional KWL chart as it places an emphasis on observation and examination of evidence that supports what they see.

=== Mooney ===
Margaret Mooney suggested a variation to the KWL chart by adding a fifth column to the traditional chart. This column would be located between the "W" and the "L". Its purpose is to answer the question "How". This encourages the students to develop their own means of how they will discover more information. This can be quite useful in the sciences for experimentation purposes.

== Assessment and evaluation ==
The KWL chart is useful to complete formative assessment in the classroom. It allows the teacher to find out the students prior knowledge on a particular topic. From this knowledge the teacher is then able to gear their lessons based upon this information. The KWL chart can be completed when starting a new topic and be added to throughout the unit. Further, the teacher is able to find out what the students have learned by the end of their lessons.

KWL charts work well in order to examine the individual student or the entire class in order to understand their thinking and learning.

=== Advantages ===
According to Jared and Jared (1997), KWL was established with the motive to enhance the comprehensive reading skills of the students. This was done by designing the three levels of the activity focusing on the different learning styles of the individuals. According to Glazer(1998), students fail to enjoy the text or content because they fail to understand it. Hence, KWL increases their comprehension skills as the activity goes through each topic step by step. According to Szabo(2006), a KWL table uses a strategy of before-during-after for the students to enhance their comprehension skills. The students start by brainstorming the prior knowledge about the topic and then eventually develop curiosity about the topic. This builds their interest in the topic and they would want to learn more about the topic. KWL chart gives an opportunity to the individual to build up self-motivation regarding the topic. Through KWL table, the students go through self-evaluation as they know what they intend to learn and what they really understood. Hence, KWL gives the students some space to explore the topic through other sources and build up their knowledge.

== See also ==
- SQ3R
- PQRST

== Bibliography ==
- McKenna, M. (3) Help for struggling readers: strategies for grades 3-8. New York: The Guilford Press.
- Valmont, W. (2006). Technology for literacy teaching and learning. New York: Houghton Mifflin Company.
- Allington, R. and Cunningham, P. (2004). Classrooms that work. Boston: Allyn and Bacon.
- Padak, N. and Rasinski, T. (2004). Effective reading strategies: teaching children who find reading difficult. New Jersey: Pearson Education, Inc.
- Buehl, D. (2006). Classroom strategies for interactive learning. Delaware: International Reading Association.
