= Revision (writing) =

Stage in the writing process

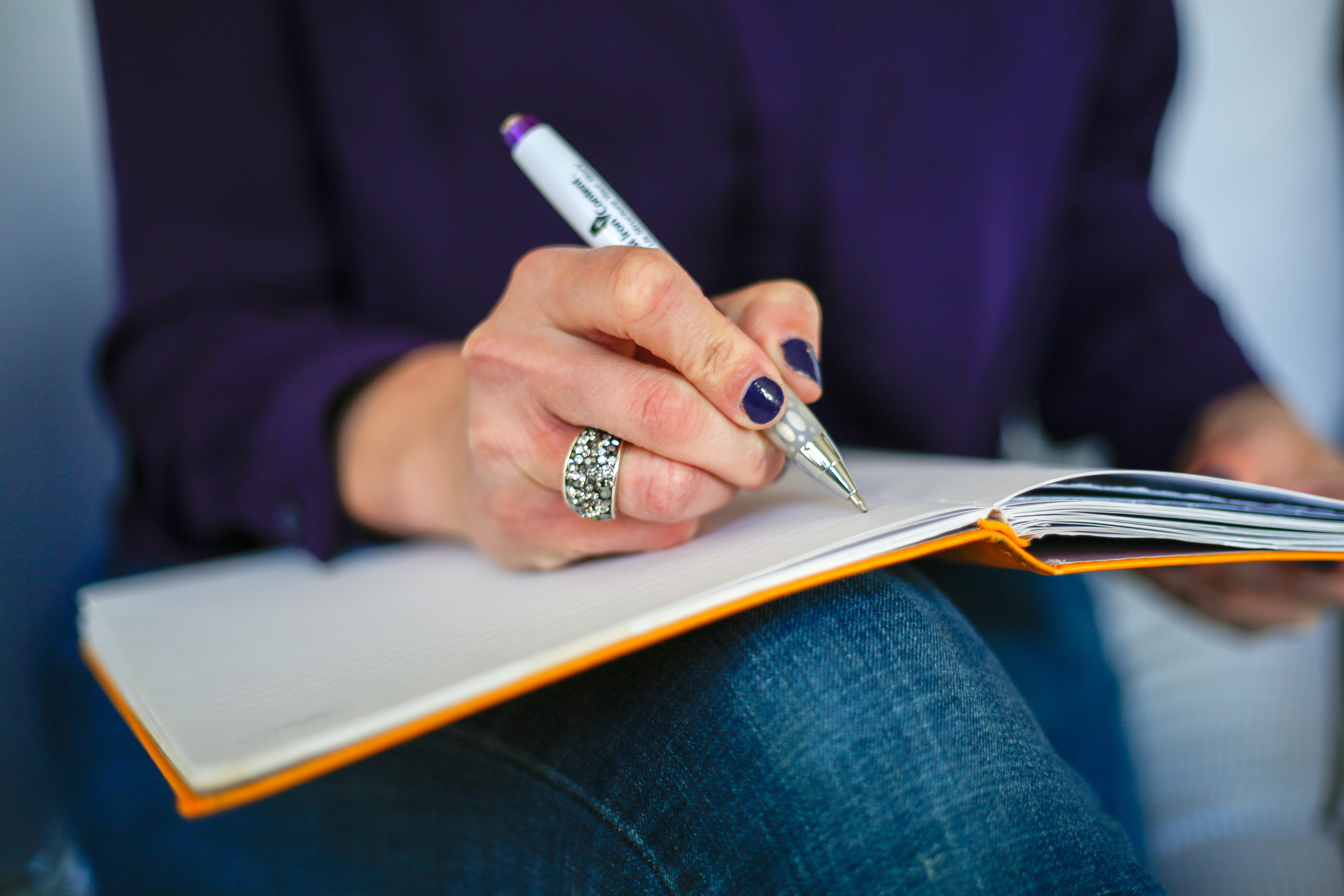

Revision is a process in writing of rearranging, adding, or removing paragraphs, sentences, or words. Writers may revise their writing after a draft is complete or during the composing process. Revision involves many of the strategies known generally as editing but also can entail larger conceptual shifts of purpose and audience as well as content. Within the writing process, revision comes once one has written a draft to work with, so that one can re-see and improve it, iteratively. Working at both deeper and more surface levels a writer can increase the power of the text.

In an essay, revision may involve the identification of a thesis, a reconsideration of structure or organization, working at uncovering weaknesses, elaborating evidence and illustrations, or clarifying unclear positions. A factor that distinguishes students from making surface level revisions to macro level revisions, is the amount of time given by teachers. Revision takes time. Many writers go through multiple rounds of revisions before they reach a final draft.

Revision is a larger category of writing behaviors than line-editing or proofreading, though writers often make large reorganizations and word-level edits simultaneously. There are theories such as the three-component model hypothesized by Linda Flower and John R. Hayes and James Britton et al.'s model of the writing process as a series of stages described in metaphors of linear growth, conception - incubation - production. Here, a review by the writer or a third party, which often give corrective annotations, is part of the process that leads to the revision stage.

Revision of AI-generated drafts has also been studied empirically. In the LAMP corpus, professional writers edited 1,057 large language model-generated creative paragraphs, and the researchers developed a seven-category taxonomy of undesirable features, including clichés and unnecessary exposition.

== Revision as a threshold concept ==
Revision is a threshold concept. Threshold concepts are ideas that are essential to grasping further topics of study. It is sometimes viewed as challenging for students due to preconceived views. The hierarchy system established in classroom settings between teacher and student might encourage students to see revision as a form of punishment, forcing students to fix their mistakes. It also works to make students more receptive to teacher feedback, giving teachers the title of "co-authors" of students writing.

=== Reflection in the revision process ===
Another way to think about the writing process and revision is Peter Elbow's concept of first- and second-order thinking. First-order thinking involves intuition and creativity; it consists of exploring tangents and generating ideas. The prewriting and drafting process entails first-order thinking. Second-order thinking involves being critical and analytical of one's own writing; it consists of reflecting on the ideas developed through drafting and ensuring that they are clearly expressed and well-supported.

Reflective writing encourages writers to think about their own thinking which is also known as metacognition. Reflection can also be considered a type of second-order thinking. This analytical approach of thinking asks the writer to examine their work with a critical mindset. Writers are able to consider the intended audience and purpose of a piece of writing by asking themselves who, what, and why questions such as: Who is my audience? What is the theme? Why is this important? Reflection can help writers gain more insight into the composing and revision processes by providing a method for them to develop a sense of purpose, analyze their ideas, and set revision goals. In writing, revision is a powerful tool that relies heavily on one's knowledge and intentions.

== Revision as a collaborative process ==
In educational settings, peer revision, or feedback, is a common collaborative writing practice. In organizational and other workplace settings where collaborative writing is common, participation of multiple writers facilitates communal revision. Recently, due to the collaborative capabilities of the Internet, there are writers who "crowdsource" reviews from several people, who contribute digital annotations.

Teachers' prompts that incorporate the process of invention spark collaboration and communication amongst students in the classroom, producing feedback between peers. Peer review allows writers to learn from one another and assess issues that may have been overlooked. It gives writers an outside perspective, increasing their understanding of how their writing is being interpreted by their intended audience. It allows students to learn and strategize with one another. Peer feedback engages the concept of discourse communities, where individuals share genres, language, values, concepts, and "ways of being" too better the group as a whole. Discourse communities give writers a space to collaborate with those who have a suitable degree of relevant content or who share a common set of goals.
