= Walter Pauk =

American academic (1914-2019)

Walter Pauk was Cornell University's reading and study center director. He was the author of the best-selling How To Study In College. Pauk has been lauded as "one of the most influential professors in the field of developmental education and study skills". He created Cornell Notes.

In 1997, Pauk was recognized for his work with the Pearl Anniversary Award by The College Reading and Learning Association.

Pauk was born in New Britain, Hartford County, Connecticut, on May 1, 1914 and died on December 7, 2019.

== Select bibliography ==
- Pauk, Walter (1962). How to study in college. Boston: Houghton Mifflin.
- Pauk, Walter (1974). Six-Way Paragraphs - 100 Passages for Developing the Six Essential Categories of Comprehension. Providence, RI: Jamestown Publishers, Inc. ISBN 0-89061-009-6.
- Pauk, Walter; Josephine M. Wilson (c. 1976). Readings in English. London; New York: McGraw-Hill. ISBN 0-07-094441-5.
- Pauk, Walter (1986). Study skills for college athletes. Clearwater, Fla.: Reston-Stuart Pub. Co. ISBN 0-9614487-0-9.
- Pauk, Walter (c. 1987). Study skills for community and junior colleges. Clearwater, Fla: Reston-Stuart. ISBN 0-9614487-1-7.
- Pauk, Walter (c. 1998). Study skills for student athletes. Clearwater, FL: H&H Pub. ISBN 0-943202-69-8.
- Pauk, Walter (1999). Essential study strategies. Clearwater, FL: H&H Pub. ISBN 9780943202716.
- Pauk, Walter; Ross J.Q. Owens (c. 2008). How to study in college (9th ed.). Boston, MA: Houghton Mifflin Co. ISBN 0-618-76645-6.
