= Social semiotics =

Field of semiotics

Social semiotics (also social semantics) is a branch of the field of semiotics which investigates human signifying practices in specific social and cultural circumstances, and which tries to explain meaning-making as a social practice. Semiotics, as originally defined by Ferdinand de Saussure, is "the science of the life of signs in society". Social semiotics expands on Saussure's founding insights by exploring the implications of the fact that the "codes" of language and communication are formed by social processes. The crucial implication here is that meanings and semiotic systems are shaped by relations of power, and that as power shifts in society, our languages and other systems of socially accepted meanings can and do change.

== Overview ==
Social semiotics is the study of the social dimensions of meaning, and of the power of human processes of signification and interpretation (known as semiosis) in shaping individuals and societies. Social semiotics focuses on social meaning-making practices of all types, whether visual, verbal or aural in nature. These different systems for meaning-making, or possible "channels" (e.g. speech, writing, images) are known as semiotic modes (or semiotic registers). Semiotic modes can include visual, verbal, written, gestural and musical resources for communication. They also include various "multimodal" ensembles of any of these modes.

Social semiotics can include the study of how people design and interpret meanings, the study of texts, and the study of how semiotic systems are shaped by social interests and ideologies, and how they are adapted as society changes Structuralist semiotics in the tradition of Ferdinand de Saussure focused primarily on theorising semiotic systems or structures (termed langue by de Saussure, which change diachronically, i.e. over longer periods of time). In contrast, social semiotics tries to account for the variability of semiotic practices termed parole by Saussure. This altered focus shows how individual creativity, changing historical circumstances, and new social identities and projects can all change patterns of usage and design. From a social semiotic perspective, rather than being fixed into unchanging "codes", signs are considered to be resources which people use and adapt (or "design") to make meaning. In these respects, social semiotics was influenced by, and shares many of the preoccupations of pragmatics (Charles W. Morris) and sociolinguistics and has much in common with cultural studies and critical discourse analysis.

The main task of social semiotics is to develop analytical and theoretical frameworks which can explain meaning-making in a social context.

== Halliday and the social semiotic in language ==
Linguistic theorist, Michael Halliday, introduced the term ‘social semiotics’ into linguistics, when he used the phrase in the title of his book, Language as Social Semiotic. This work argues against the traditional separation between language and society, and exemplifies the start of a 'semiotic' approach, which broadens the narrow focus on written language in linguistics. For Halliday, languages evolve as systems of "meaning potential" or as sets of resources which influence what the speaker can do with language, in a particular social context. For example, for Halliday, the grammar of the English language is a system organised for the following three purposes (areas or "metafunctions"):

- Facilitating certain kinds of social and interpersonal interactions (interpersonal),
- Representing ideas about the world (ideational), and
- Connecting these ideas and interactions into meaningful texts and making them relevant to their context (textual).

Any sentence in English is composed like a musical composition, with one strand of its meaning coming from each of the three semiotic areas or metafunctions. Bob Hodge generalises Halliday’s essays on social semiotics into five premises:

1. ‘Language is a social fact’
2. ‘We shall not come to understand the nature of language if we pursue only the kinds of question about language that are formulated by linguists’
3. ‘Language is as it is because of the functions it has evolved to serve in people’s lives’.
4. Language has ‘metafunctions’, which in English are: ideational (‘about something’), interpersonal (’doing something’) and textual (‘the speaker’s text-forming potential’).
5. Language is constituted as ‘a discrete network of options’

== Social semiotics and critical linguistics ==
Robert Hodge and Gunther Kress's Social Semiotics focused on the uses of semiotic systems in social practice. They explain that the social power of texts in society depends on interpretation: "Each producer of a message relies on its recipients for it to function as intended." This process of interpretation (semiosis) situates individual texts within discourses, the exchanges of interpretative communities. The work of interpretation can contest the power of hegemonic discourses. Hodge and Kress give the example of feminist activists defacing a sexist advertising billboard, and spray-painting it with a new, feminist message.

"Text is only a trace of discourses, frozen and preserved, more or less reliable or misleading. Yet discourse disappears too rapidly, surrounding a flow of texts."

Hodge and Kress built on a range of traditions from linguistics (including Noam Chomsky, Michael Halliday, Benjamin Lee Whorf and sociolinguistics), but the major impetus for their work is the critical perspective on ideology and society that originates with Marx.

Hodge and Kress build a notion of semiosis as a dynamic process, where meaning is not determined by rigid structures, or predefined cultural codes. They argue that Ferdinand de Saussure's structuralist semiotics avoided addressing questions about creativity, movement, and change in language, possibly in reaction to the diachronic linguistic traditions of his time (the focus on the historical development from Indo-European). This created a "problematic" legacy, with linguistic change relegated to the "contents of Saussure’s rubbish bin".

Instead, Hodge and Kress propose to account for change in semiosis through the work of Charles Sanders Peirce. Meaning is a process, in their interpretation of Peirce. They refer to Peirce's triadic model of semiosis, which depicts the "action" of a sign as a limitless process of infinite semiosis, where one "interpretant" (or idea linked to a sign) generates another. The flow of these infinite processes of interpretation are constrained in Peirce's model, they claim, by the material world (the "object"), and cultural rules of thought, or "habit".

Social semiotics revisits De Saussure's doctrine of the "arbitrariness of the linguistic sign". This notion rests on the argument that the signifier only has an arbitrary relationship to the signified) — in other words, that there is nothing about the sound or appearance of (verbal) signifiers (as, for example, the words "dog" or "chien") — to suggest what they signify. Hodge and Kress point out that questions of the referent become more complicated when semiotics moves beyond verbal language. On the one hand, there is the need to account for the continuum of relationships between the referent and the representation. Here, they draw on Pierce's differentiation between iconic signification (e.g. a colour photograph of smoke, where the signifier recreates the perceptual experience of the signified), indexical signification (e.g. a column of smoke, where there is a causal relationship between the physical signifier and the fire it might signify), and symbolic signification (e.g. the word "smoke", where the arbitrary link between signifier and signified is maintained by social convention).

Social semiotics also addresses the question of how societies and cultures maintain or shift these conventional bonds between signifier and signified. De Saussure was unwilling to answer this question, Hodge and Kress claim. This leaves the socially determinist implication that meanings and interpretations are dictated from above, by "the whims of an inscrutably powerful collective being, Society." For Hodge and Kress, social semiotics must respond to the question and explain how the social shaping of meanings works in practice.

== Social semiotics and multimodality ==
Social semiotics is currently extending this general framework beyond its linguistic origins to account for the growing importance of sound and visual images, and how modes of communication are combined in both traditional and digital media (semiotics of social networking), thus approaching semiotics of culture. Theorists such as Gunther Kress and Theo van Leeuwen have built on Halliday's framework by providing new "grammars" for other semiotic modes. Like language, these grammars are seen as socially formed and changeable sets of available "resources" for making meaning, which are also shaped by the semiotic metafunctions originally identified by Halliday. The visual and aural modes have received particular attention. Accounting for multimodality (communication in and across a range of semiotic modes - verbal, visual, and aural) is considered a particularly important ongoing project, given the importance of the visual mode in contemporary communication.

In the field of graphic design, the multimodal and social semiotic viewpoint can be perceived as an illustration that connects our sensory abilities together opening up new opportunities for deeper visual interaction. Utilizing this design process, the graphic designers create content which helps improvise the act of meaningful visual communication between the content creators and their audiences.

== Sources ==
- Halliday, M. A. K. (1978). Language as Social Semiotic: The Social Interpretation of Language and Meaning. Maryland: University Park Press. ISBN 978-0-8391-1191-7.
- Hodge, Robert; Kress, Gunther (1988). Social Semiotics. Cambridge: Polity Press. ISBN 978-0-7456-0373-5.
- Kress, G.; Van Leeuwen, T. (2001). Multimodal Discourse: The Modes and Media of Contemporary Communication. London: Arnold.
- Kress, Gunther; Van Leeuwen, Theo (1996). Reading Images: The Grammar of Visual Design. London: Routledge. ISBN 978-0-415-12344-0.
- Thibault, Paul (1991). Social semiotics as praxis: Text, social meaning making, and Nabokov's Ada. Minneapolis: University of Minnesota Press.
- Randviir, Anti (2004). Mapping the World: Towards a Sociosemiotic Approach to Culture (PDF). Dissertationes Semioticae Universitatis Tartuensis. Vol. 6. Tartu: Tartu University Press. ISBN 9949-11-002-5.
- Thibault, Paul (2004). Agency and Consciousness in Discourse: Self-Other Dynamics as a Complex System. Continuum. p. 209.
- Van Leeuwen, Theo (2005). Introducing Social Semiotics. New York: Routledge. ISBN 978-0-415-26044-2.
