= Ruth Wodak =

Austrian linguist (born 1950)

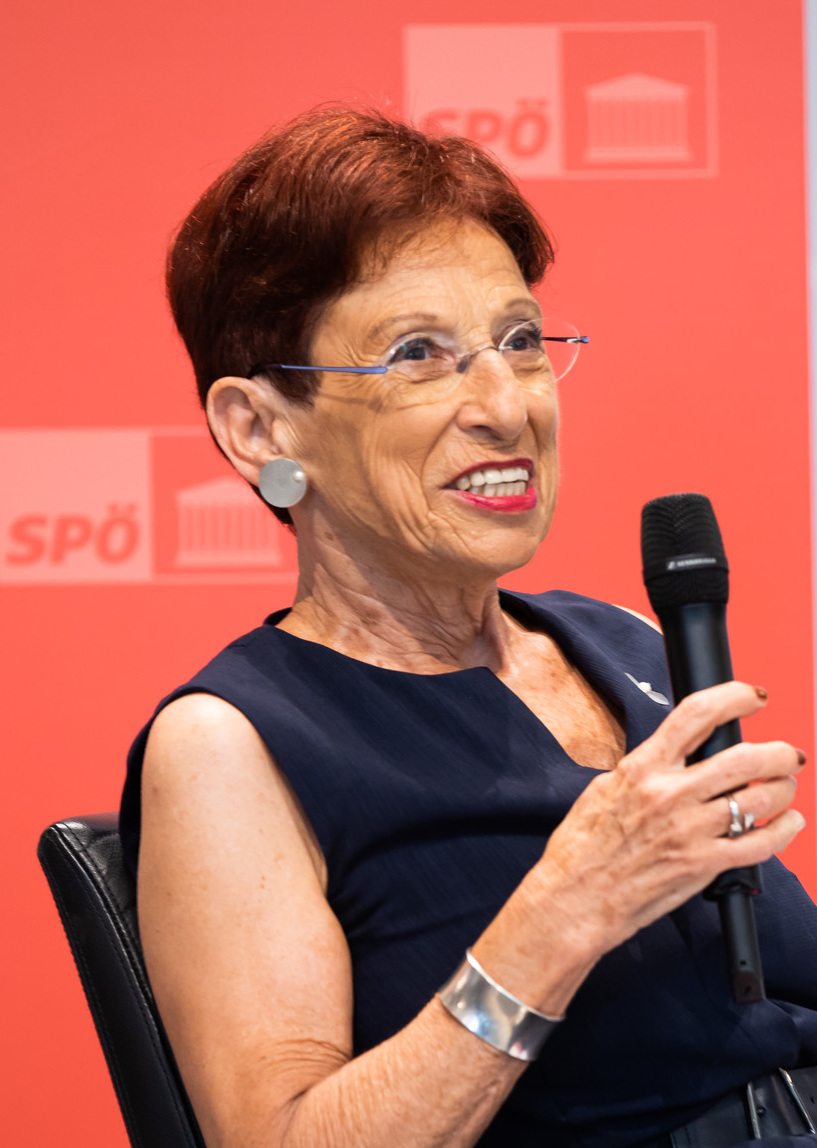
- Wodak in 2021
- Born: 12 July 1950 (age 76); London, United Kingdom
- Education: Lancaster University
- Known for: Critical discourse analysis
- Awards: Grand Decoration of Honour in Silver for Services to the Republic of Austria (2011); Wittgenstein Award (1996)
- Scientific career
- Fields: Critical discourse analysis
- Workplaces: Lancaster University

Ruth Wodak FAcSS (born 12 July 1950 in London) is an Austrian linguist and professor emeritus of discourse studies at Lancaster University. She is also University Professor emeritus at the University of Vienna, where she served as professor of applied linguistics since 1991.

Wodak is known as a leading figure in critical discourse studies (CDS), with research spanning discourse theory, gender studies, national and European identity politics and the politics of the past, racism, antisemitism, far-right-wing populism, political and media communication, and interdisciplinary methodological innovations.

She is a member of the editorial boards of multiple linguistic journals and co-editor of Discourse and Society and Critical Discourse Studies. Wodak was the founding editor, alongside Paul Chilton, of the book series Discourse Approaches to Politics, Society and Culture (DAPSAC) and of the journal Language and Politics.

She has received numerous distinctions for her scholarly achievements, including two honorary doctorates, as well as major awards such as the Wittgenstein Award, Austria’s highest scientific honour.

== Early life and education ==
Wodak was born on 12 July 1950 in London, United Kingdom, to Austrian refugee parents. Her father, Walter Wodak, who was born into a Jewish family in Vienna, served in the British Army during the Second World War. After 1945, he returned to Vienna and was subsequently invited to join the Austrian diplomatic service. He later served as an Austrian diplomat at the Austrian embassy in London, where her parents remained until 1950.

Her mother, Erna, daughter of a rabbi in Vienna, had to flee Vienna 1938 and completed her PhD thesis in Manchester, with a grant by the British government for refugees who had not been able to complete their studies due to annexation of Austria into Nazi Germany. During her childhood, Ruth Wodak lived in several European cities due to her father’s diplomatic postings, including Paris, Belgrade, Moscow, and Vienna, where she spent most of her formative years.

From 1956 to 1959, she attended the International School in Belgrade, and later completed elementary and secondary schooling in Vienna, graduating with honors. She studied Slavic studies, Eastern European history, and linguistics at the University of Vienna, earning her PhD in 1974 with a dissertation entitled The Language of Defendants at Court. She completed her habilitation in applied linguistics in 1980, with a book, translated into the English in 1986, titled Language Behavior in Therapy Groups.

== Career ==
Wodak began her academic career in 1971 as a research assistant at the University of Vienna’s Department of Linguistics. From 1975 to 1983, she worked as a university assistant, and until 1991, she was an associate professor in applied linguistics, including sociolinguistics and psycholinguistics.

In 1991, she was offered a full professorship both at the University of Michigan, which she declined, and at Vienna University. She chose to continue her work as a full professor at the University of Vienna. From 1997 to 2003, she directed the Wittgenstein research centre Discourse, Politics, Identity, established through her Wittgenstein Award (the most prestigious prize for scholars in Austria), received in 1996. Between 1999 and 2002, she served as visiting professor at the Austrian Academy of Sciences, where her research centre Discourse, Politics, Identity was located. From 2000–2003, she also co-directed the Austrian National Focal Point of the European Agency for Fundamental Rights (then EUMC).

In 2004, Wodak moved to Lancaster University in the United Kingdom (headhunted as successor to Norman Fairclough), where she served as Distinguished Professor in Discourse Studies until 2016 and continues as emeritus.

Throughout her career, she has held numerous visiting professorships and fellowships, including at the European University Institute, Georgetown University, Malmö University, Norwich University, Örebro University, Uppsala University, Stanford University, University of Minnesota, and the Institute for Human Sciences.

Since 2010, Wodak has been a member of the Academia Europaea, and in 2013, she was elected to the Academy of Social Sciences.

== Research ==
Wodak’s research spans a broad interdisciplinary agenda within critical discourse studies and sociolinguistics. Her current work focuses on the discourse-historical approach developed in the early 1990s in collaboration with colleagues during research on post-war antisemitism in Austria.

Her earlier scholarship made significant contributions to the study of institutional and organizational communication as well as gender studies. She conducted empirical and ethnographic analyses of discourse in institutional settings such as courts, hospitals, schools, and bureaucratic European Union organizations, examining how language structures professional practices, authority, and decision-making. Her work in gender studies explored discursive practices in female socialization, including interactions between mothers and daughters, gendered communication in both private and institutional contexts, and the role of language in reproducing social inequalities.

Building on these foundations, Wodak’s later and research integrates linguistic analysis with ethnography, argumentation theory, rhetoric, pragmatics, and text linguistics to investigate identity politics, racism, antisemitism, right-wing populism, xenophobia, and the politics of memory in national and European contexts. Her work demonstrates how discourses operate across institutional, social, and political domains to construct identities, sustain power relations, and shape social hierarchies over time.

Wodak’s monograph, The Politics of Fear: The Shameless Normalisation of Far-right Discourse, was published in a fully revised and expanded second edition in 2020. The German version was translated from the English original. The book has also been translated into Russian, Chinese, Korean, Bosnian, and Spanish. The work examines the rhetoric, strategies, and argumentation of far-right political movements in Europe and the United States, with particular attention to the interactions between politics and the media through detailed case studies. Central themes include the recontextualization and globalization of images and posters across various European far-right parties, as well as the increasing influence of social media.

Ruth Wodak, together with Michael Meyer, edited the third revised edition of Methods of Critical Discourse Studies (Sage, 2015), a key methodological volume in the field that includes influential chapters such as “Critical Discourse Studies: History, Agenda, Theory, and Methodology,” co-authored by Wodak, as well as numerous contributions outlining different analytical approaches.

Alongside her methodological work, Wodak has produced publications on nationalism, history, and political discourse. Her co-authored monograph The Discursive Construction of National Identity examines how national identities are constructed through discourse in European contexts, particularly Austria, and has become a central reference in critical discourse studies. She also co-edited the volume The Discursive Construction of History: Remembering the German Wehrmacht’s War of Annihilation (2008), which analyses how the war crimes of the Wehrmacht have been publicly debated and represented. In addition, Wodak has published in edited volumes and journals on topics such as political communication, right-wing populism, and discourse theory.

In 2013, Wodak co-authored two volumes on right-wing populist discourse: Analysis of European Fascism: Fascism in Text and Talk (with John Richardson, Routledge) and Right-wing Populism in Europe: Politics and Discourse (with Maijd KhosraviNik and Brigitte Mral, Bloomsbury). She has also contributed commentaries and short essays to Der Standard, Newsweek, Euronews,OpenDemocracy, and the Center for the Analysis of the Radical Right (CARR).

Another monograph, The Discourse of Politics in Action: Politics as Usual, was published in a second revised edition in 2011 (Palgrave Macmillan). Wodak has also co-edited several influential volumes, including Identity, Belonging and Migration (with Gerard Delanty and Paul R. Jones, 2011), The Handbook of Sociolinguistics (with Paul Kerswill and Barbara Johnstone, 2013), and The Handbook of Language and Politics (with Bernhard Forchtner, 2018, Routledge). She also edited a collection published by Czernin Verlag in 2024 on everyday antisemitism in Austria.

== Awards and honours ==
In 1996, she was awarded the Wittgenstein Award, the highest Austrian science award. In October 2006, she was awarded the Woman's Prize of the City of Vienna. She was awarded the Kerstin Hesselgren Chair of the Swedish Riksdag and stayed at Örebro University from March to June 2008. In 2010 she received an honorary doctorate from Örebro University.

In December 2011, Karl Heinz Töchterle, Minister of Science and Education, presented her with the Grand Decoration of Honour in Silver for Services to the Republic of Austria on behalf of the president of Austria, Heinz Fischer.

She was elected fellow of the Academy of Social Sciences in 2013.

Wodak was a Fulbright Austria Scholar at Stanford University. She has held visiting professorships at Uppsala University, University of Minnesota, and Georgetown University, and a Leverhulme Visiting Professorship at the University of East Anglia.

In 2023 Wodak received an honorary degree from the University of Warwick.

== Selected bibliography ==
=== Authored ooks ===
- Wodak, Ruth; Rheindorf, Markus (2026). Babyelefant und Hausverstand: Wie Krisen produziert werden (in German). Picus Verlag. ISBN 978-3-7117-3506-5.
- Wodak, Ruth; Rheindorf, Markus (2022). Identity Politics Past and Present: Political Discourses from Post-war Austria to the Covid Crisis. University of Exeter Press. ISBN 978-1-905816-80-4.
- Wodak, Ruth (2020-10-12). The Politics of Fear: The Shameless Normalization of Far-Right Discourse. SAGE. ISBN 978-1-5297-3853-7.
- Wodak, Ruth (2020). Politik mit der Angst: die schamlose Normalisierung rechtspopulistischer und rechtsextremer Diskurse (2. Auflage, völlig neu bearbeitet ed.). Wien Hamburg: Edition Konturen. ISBN 978-3-902968-56-2.
- De Cillia, Rudolf (2020). Österreichische Identitäten im Wandel: empirische Untersuchungen zu ihrer diskursiven Konstruktion 1995-2015. Wiesbaden: Springer VS. ISBN 978-3-658-28700-9.
- Wodak, Ruth (2015). The politics of fear: what right-wing populist discourses mean. London: Sage. ISBN 978-1-4462-4700-6.
- Wodak, R. (2009-04-28). The Discourse of Politics in Action: Politics as Usual. Springer. ISBN 978-0-230-31653-9.
- Reisigl, Martin; Wodak, Ruth (2001). Discourse and discrimination: rhetorics of racism and antisemitism. London ; New York: Routledge. ISBN 978-0-415-23149-7.
- Wodak, Ruth (1996). Disorders of discourse. Real language series. London ; New York: Longman. ISBN 978-0-582-09957-9.

=== Edited books ===
- Wodak, Ruth, ed. (2024). Das kann immer noch in Wien passieren: Alltagsgeschichten. Wien: Czernin. ISBN 978-3-7076-0833-5.
- Wodak, Ruth; Forchtner, Bernhard, eds. (2021). The Routledge handbook of language and politics. Routledge handbooks (First issued in paperback ed.). London New York: Routledge, Taylor & Francis Group. ISBN 978-1-032-09648-3.
- Wodak, Ruth; KhosraviNik, Majid; Mral, Brigitte, eds. (2013). Right-wing populism in Europe: politics and discourse. London: Bloomsbury. ISBN 978-1-78093-232-3.
- Wodak, Ruth, ed. (2013). Critical discourse analysis. SAGE benchmarks in language and linguistics. Los Angeles: SAGE. ISBN 978-1-4462-1058-1.
- Wodak, Ruth; Johnstone, Barbara; Kerswill, Paul (2011). The SAGE Handbook of Sociolinguistics. 1 Oliver's Yard, 55 City Road, London EC1Y 1SP United Kingdom: SAGE Publications Ltd. doi:10.4135/9781446200957. ISBN 978-1-84787-095-7.
- Wodak, Ruth; Meyer, Michael (2001). Methods of Critical Discourse Analysis. 6 Bonhill Street, London EC2A 4PU: SAGE Publications, Ltd. doi:10.4135/9780857028020. ISBN 978-0-7619-6154-3.
- Wodak, Ruth, ed. (2009). The discursive construction of national identity. Critical discourse analysis (2nd ed.). Edinburgh: Edinburgh University Press. ISBN 978-0-7486-3726-3.
- Wodak, Ruth; Koller, Veronika, eds. (2008-05-20). Handbook of Communication in the Public Sphere. Mouton de Gruyter. doi:10.1515/9783110198980. ISBN 978-3-11-018832-5.
- Wodak, Ruth; Krzyżanowski, Michał, eds. (2008). Qualitative discourse analysis in the social sciences. Houndmills, Basingstoke, Hampshire [England] ; New York: Palgrave Macmillan. ISBN 978-0-230-01986-7.
- Wodak, Ruth; Chilton, Paul, eds. (2005-07-28). A New Agenda in (Critical) Discourse Analysis. Discourse Approaches to Politics, Society and Culture. Vol. 13. Amsterdam: John Benjamins Publishing Company. doi:10.1075/dapsac.13. ISBN 978-90-272-2703-4.
- Weiss, G.; Wodak, R., eds. (2003). Critical Discourse Analysis: Theory and Interdisciplinarity (1st ed. 2003 ed.). London: Palgrave Macmillan UK. ISBN 978-1-349-42926-4.
- Liebhart, KarinVE; de Cillia, Rudolf; Reisigl, Martin (2009-01-19). The Discursive Construction of National Identity. Edinburgh University Press. doi:10.1515/9780748637355. ISBN 978-0-7486-3735-5.
- Wodak, Ruth, ed. (1997). Gender and discourse. Sage studies in discourse. London ; Thousand Oaks, Calif: Sage Publications. ISBN 978-0-7619-5098-1.
- Wodak, Ruth, ed. (1989). Language, power, and ideology: studies in political discourse. Critical theory. Amsterdam ; Philadelphia: J. Benjamins Pub. Co. ISBN 978-1-55619-037-7.
