= Andrew Burn (professor) =

English professor and media theorist

- Burn addressing the International Media Literacy conference, Hong Kong, 2015
- Born: Andrew Burn; 1954 (age 71–72); Shifnal, United Kingdom
- Education: St John's College, Oxford
- Occupation: Professor
- Employer: University College London
- Known for: Media Arts education; Kineikonic Mode theory
- Website: AndrewBurn.org

Andrew Burn (born 1954) is an English professor and media theorist. He works in the fields of media arts education, multimodality and play, and for the development of the theory of the Kineikonic Mode. He is Emeritus professor of Media at the UCL Institute of Education.

== Early life and education ==
Burn was born in Shifnal, England. His family lived in Darlington, before moving to Kota Kinabalu, Sabah in Malaysia, where his father was Dean of All Saints' Cathedral. He was educated at Christ's Hospital, and went on to study English at St John's College, Oxford, winning the Eugene Lee-Hamilton prize for the best Petrarchan sonnet in Oxford and Cambridge in 1975.

== Career ==
Burn's teaching career started as a secondary school teacher, working for over twenty years in comprehensive schools in Huntingdon, St. Neots and Cambridge. He served as a member of the Labour Party's ruling administration of Cambridge City council between 1982 and 1987, succeeding Clarissa Kaldor in representing the King's Hedges ward. He contributed to the peace initiative to twin the city of Cambridge with Szeged, Hungary.

During the specialization of United Kingdom secondary schools in the late 1990s, Burn played a key role in ensuring his school, Parkside Community College, became the UK's first specialist media arts college. The work lasted roughly a decade, with the college focusing on film, animation and video games. It is described in the book Burn co-authored with James Durran regarding media literacy in schools, which was published in 2007 by SAGE. The book represents key aspects of Burn's theory and research, in particular how media education can foster cultural, critical and creative work by young people, especially in their production of their own films, animations and videogames, cultural forms which occupy a large part of Burn's research work.

Burn moved into Higher Education after studying for a Master of Arts degree in Cultural Studies and a PhD in film semiotics at the UCL Institute of Education. His doctoral supervisor was Gunther Kress. He was appointed lecturer in Media and Cultural Studies at the IOE in 2001, becoming a Reader in 2007, and Professor in 2009. He is now Emeritus Professor of Media, based at the UCL Knowledge Lab. He was the first professor of media at UCL, initiating an expansion of postgraduate programmes in media studies and UCL’s first undergraduate degree in media. He has been a visiting professor at the University of Vienna and the University of Agder.

In 2003, Burn was the first person to establish and coin the term, Kineikonic Mode. The work was based in multimodality theory, studying the overall function of various modes in film, animation and video game. The Kineikonic Mode is also related to film theory, but argues for integration of analysis across filming, editing, dramatic action, language, music and other modes. It has since been expanded to analyse time and space in young people's media productions, and how these express aspects of identity.

Burn is also director of MAGiCAL Projects, an enterprise for developing and marketing game-based tools for education and leisure. Missionmaker is one example, enabling games to be created by young people to learn about game culture and design.

== Media Arts and Play Research ==
In 2012, Burn became a founding member and co-director of a collaborative research initiative between the UCL Institute of Education and the British Film Institute. The DARE collaborative (Digital|Arts|Research|Education) was created as a research partnership focused on digital media, the media arts, and arts education. It aims to promote conversations between researchers, educators, cultural institutions and media arts practitioners. It was renamed ReMAP (Research in Media Arts and Play) in 2021, reflecting the wider range of interests across the general field of media arts among its growing membership.

Projects conducted by Burn for DARE include a European study of film education with the British Film Institute; Playing Shakespeare, which developed the Missionmaker videogame-authoring tool for Macbeth with Shakespeare's Globe; Playing Beowulf, which developed a similar tool for the Anglo-Saxon epic Beowulf with the British Library; and Playing Macbeth, developing the Missionmaker tool once again in partnership with the British Library. These last three, which all explore the relationship between literature and videogames, are described in Burn's 2021 monograph, Literature, Videogames and Learning.

Burn has also led a major project with the British Library, the University of Sheffield, and the University of East London, to create a digital archive of research on playground games and their relation to children's media cultures. This archive, at the British Library, includes the sound collection of Iona and Peter Opie, making it a repository of international importance. Burn and his colleagues were awarded the 2016 Opie Prize of the American Folklore Society for the book of the project. A successor project, also led by Burn, again with colleagues at the University of Sheffield, has digitised the Opie manuscript archive at the Bodleian Libraries.

== Kineikonic Mode ==
The Kineikonic Mode was developed from the idea of multimodality, a theory of the way in which different forms of communication work together. The rise in technology during the 20th century meant that many historic modes were revisited in the context of digital cultures and production practices. The study of the moving image, an important cultural form in modern society, is addressed by the Kineikonic Mode.

Burn established the theory of the Kineikonic Mode in 2003 with BFI researcher David Parker. It was proposed as a general theory of film semiotics, but has often been used to explore the way that informal digital video production can construct, represent or dramatize the identities of young filmmakers. The term adapts two Greek words which signify "moving image". It provides a way to study how modes such as speech, music, dramatic action are orchestrated by the grammars of filming and editing to create meaning for makers and viewers.

The theory can be applied to a number of cultural forms, including film, video, video game and animation. The concept of "mode" is derived from multimodal theory. By studying each mode individually and together, analysts can understand how the meaning of a text is constructed.

== Bibliography ==
- Analysing Media Texts, with David Parker (Bloomsbury, 2003)
- Computer Games: Text, Narrative, Play, with Diane Carr, David Buckingham and Gareth Schott (Polity, 2006)
- Media Literacy in Schools, with James Durran (Sage, 2007)
- Media Teaching: Language, Audience and Production (2008)
- Making New Media (Peter Lang, 2009)
- Children, Media and Playground Cultures, with Rebekah Willett, Jackie Marsh, Chris Richards, and Julia Bishop (Palgrave, 2013)
- Children's Games in the New Media Age, edited with Chris Richards (Routledge, 2014)
- Literature, Videogames and Learning (Routledge, 2021)
