= Critical discourse analysis =

Interdisciplinary approach to study discourse

Critical discourse analysis (CDA) is an approach to the study of discourse that views language as a form of social practice. CDA combines critique of discourse with an explanation of how it figures in and contributes to the existing social reality, as a basis for action to change the social reality in various respects. Scholars working in the tradition of CDA generally argue that (non-linguistic) social practice and linguistic practice shape one another and focus on investigating how societal power relations are established and reinforced through language use. In this sense, it differs from discourse analysis in that it highlights issues of power asymmetries, manipulation, exploitation, and structural inequities in domains such as education, media, and politics.

== Background ==
Critical discourse analysis emerged from 'critical linguistics' developed at the University of East Anglia by Roger Fowler and fellow scholars in the 1970s, and the terms are now often interchangeable. Research in the field of sociolinguistics was paying little attention to social hierarchy and power. CDA was first developed by the Lancaster school of linguists of which Norman Fairclough was the most prominent figure. Ruth Wodak has also made a major contribution to this field of study.

In addition to linguistic theory, the approach draws from social theory, critical theory and contributions from Karl Marx, Antonio Gramsci, Louis Althusser, Jürgen Habermas, Michel Foucault and Pierre Bourdieu—in order to examine ideologies and power relations involved in discourse. Language connects with the social through being the primary domain of ideology, and through being both a site of, and a stake in, struggles for power. Ideology has been called the basis of the social representations of groups, and, in psychological versions of CDA developed by Teun A. van Dijk and Ruth Wodak, there is assumed to be a sociocognitive interface between social structures and discourse structures. The historical dimension in critical discourse studies also plays an important role.

== Methodology ==
CDA is an application of discourse analysis; it is generally agreed that methods from discourse studies, the humanities and social sciences may be used in CDA research. This is on the condition that it is able to adequately and relevantly produce insights into the way discourse reproduces (or resists) social and political inequality, power abuse or domination. Examples of power being used by mainstream media have been identified in the work of Stephen Teo in Australia where he found numerous examples of racism in crime reports of Vietnamese youth. He describes the use of headlines used to control the opinions of readers to see and read about crime using what David Altheide calls fear discourse. CDA does not limit its analysis to specific structures of text or talk, but systematically relates these to structures of the sociopolitical context. This was further examined by Pamela D. Schulz in her book linking media reporting of Courts in Australia and in Western democracies. Her book "Courts and Judges on Trial: Analysing and Managing Discourses of Disapproval" showed a strong connection between political manipulation of media to encourage "tougher sentencing" while at the same time refraining from changing legislation to ensure that it happens. CDA has been used to examine rhetoric in political speech acts, and any forms of speech that may be used to manipulate the impression given to the audience. However, there have been flaws noted with CDA. For example, it has been said that it is simultaneously too broad to distinctly identify manipulations within the rhetoric, yet is also not powerful enough to appropriately find all that researchers set out to establish.

Norman Fairclough discussed the term CDA in his book Language and Power. Fairclough introduced the concepts that are now viewed as vital in CDA such as "discourse, power, ideology, social practice and common sense." He argues that language should be analyzed as a social practice through the lens of discourse in both speaking and writing.

Fairclough developed a three-dimensional framework for studying discourse, where the aim is to map three separate forms of analysis onto one another: analysis of (spoken or written) language texts, analysis of discourse practice (processes of text production, distribution and consumption) and analysis of discursive events as instances of socio-cultural practice. Particularly, he combines micro, meso and macro-level interpretation. At the micro-level, the analyst considers various aspects of textual/linguistic analysis, for example syntactic analysis, use of metaphor and rhetorical devices. The meso-level or "level of discursive practice" involves studying issues of production and consumption, for instance, which institution produced a text, who is the target audience, etc. At the macro-level, the analyst is concerned with intertextual and interdiscursive elements and tries to take into account the broad, societal currents that are affecting the text being studied.

Teun A. van Dijk's approach to critical discourse analysis combines cognitive theories with linguistic and social theories. Van Dijk uses cognition as the middle layer of a three-layer approach consisting of discourse, cognitive and society. By integrating a cognitive approach, researchers are better able to understand how larger social phenomenon are reinforced through popular, everyday discourse. Critics of this practice point out that his approach focuses on the reproduction of ideologies rather than the transformation.

Ruth Wodak has developed a framework based on the systemic collection of sample texts on a topic to better understand the interrelationship of discourses that exist within the field. This framework allows for the discussion and analysis of ideologies involved in a set of discourses. The macro level of analysis is helpful in understanding how macro-structures of inequality persist through discursive processes across multiple sites and texts.

== Applications ==
CDA has been applied to media studies, advertisements texts English language teaching, heritage language, power and ideology, socialization and environmental sciences to name a few.

== Notable academics ==
Notable writers include Norman Fairclough, Michał Krzyżanowski, Paul Chilton, Teun A. van Dijk, Ruth Wodak, Martin Reisigl, John E. Richardson, Phil Graham, Theo Van Leeuwen, Siegfried Jäger, Christina Schäffner, James Paul Gee, Roger Fowler, Gunther Kress, Mary Talbot, Lilie Chouliaraki, Thomas Huckin, Hilary Janks, Veronika Koller, Christopher Hart, Bob Hodge, Izabel Magalhães and William Feighery.

== See also ==
- Argumentation theory
- Conceptual history
- Informal logic
- Hermeneutics
- Linguistic anthropology
- Mediated Stylistics
- Pragma-dialectics
- Pragmatics
- Rhetoric
- Semiotics
- Systemic functional grammar
- Foucauldian discourse analysis

== Bibliography ==
=== References ===
- Caldas-Coulthard, Carmen Rosa, and Coulthard, Malcolm, (eds.) (1996) Texts and Practices: Readings in Critical Discourse Analysis, London: Routledge.
- Chouliaraki, Lilie & Norman Fairclough (1999). Discourse in Late Modernity: Rethinking Critical Discourse Analysis. Edinburgh: Edinburgh University Press.
- Norman Fairclough (1995). Media Discourse. London: Edward Arnold.
- Norman Fairclough (2003). Analysing Discourse: Textual Analysis for Social Research. London: Routledge.
- Jaworski, Adam, & Coupland, Nikolas (Eds.) (2002). The Discourse Reader. New York: Routledge.
- Lazar, Michelle (Ed.) (2005). Feminist Critical Discourse Analysis: Gender, Power and Ideology In Discourse. Basingstoke: Palgrave.
- Rogers, Rebecca (2003). A Critical Discourse Analysis of Family Literacy Practices: Power in and Out of Print. Mahwah, NJ: Lawrence Erlbaum.
- Rogers, Rebecca (Ed.) (2003). An Introduction to Critical Discourse Analysis in Education. Mahwah, NJ: Lawrence Erlbaum.
- Talbot, Mary, Atkinson, Karen and Atkinson, David (2003). Language and Power in the Modern World. Edinburgh: Edinburgh University Press.
- Toolan, Michael (Ed.) (2002). Critical Discourse Analysis: Critical Concepts in Linguistics (Vol I: Precursors and Inspirations). London: Routledge.
- Toolan, Michael (Ed.) (2002). Critical Discourse Analysis: Critical Concepts in Linguistics (Vol II: Leading Advocates). London: Routledge.
- Toolan, Michael (Ed.) (2002). Critical Discourse Analysis: Critical Concepts in Linguistics (Vol III: Concurrent Analyses and Critiques). London: Routledge.
- Toolan, Michael (Ed.) (2002). Critical Discourse Analysis: Critical Concepts in Linguistics (Vol IV: Current Debates and New Directions). London: Routledge.
- Teun A. Van Dijk. (1993). Elite discourse and racism. Newbury Park, CA: Sage.
- Teun A. Van Dijk. (2005). Racism and discourse in Spain and Latin America. Amsterdam: Benjamins.
- Teun A. Van Dijk. (2008). Discourse and Power. Houndsmills: Palgrave.
- Weiss, Gilbert & Wodak, Ruth (Eds.) (2003). Critical Discourse Analysis: Theory and Interdisciplinarity in Critical Discourse Analysis. London: Palgrave.
- Young, Lynne & Harrison, Claire (Eds.) (2004). Systemic Functional Linguistics and Critical Discourse Analysis: Studies in Social Change. London: Continuum.
- Anna Duszak, Juliane House, Łukasz Kumięga: Globalization, Discourse, Media: In a Critical Perspective / Globalisierung, Diskurse, Medien: eine kritische Perspektive. Warsaw University Press, 2010.

=== Further reading ===
- Amoussou, F., & Allagbe, A. A. (2018). Principles, Theories and Approaches to Critical Discourse Analysis. International Journal on Studies in English Language and Literature, 6(1), 11–18.
- Henry Widdowson (1995). Review of Fairclough's Discourse and Social Change. Applied Linguistics 16(4): 510–516.
- Norman Fairclough (1996). A Reply to Henry Widdowson's 'Discourse Analysis: A Critical View. Language & Literature 5(1): 49–56.
- Henry Widdowson (1996). Reply to Fairclough: Discourse and Interpretation: Conjectures and Refutations. Language & Literature 5(1): 57–69.
- Henry Widdowson (1998). "The Theory and Practice of Critical Discourse Analysis." Applied Linguistics 19(1): 136–151.
- O'Halloran, Kieran A. (2003) Critical Discourse Analysis and Language Cognition. Edinburgh: Edinburgh University Press.
- Beaugrande, Robert de (2001). "Interpreting the Discourse of H.G. Widdowson: A Corpus-Based Critical Discourse Analysis. Applied Linguistics 22(1): 104–121.
- Toolan, Michael (1997). What Is Critical Discourse Analysis and Why Are People Saying Such Terrible Things About It? Language & Literature 6(2): 83–103.
- Stubbs, Michael (1998). Whorf's Children: Critical Comments on Critical Discourse Analysis. In Ryan, A. & Wray, A. (Eds.), Evolving Models of Language: British Studies in Applied Linguistics 12, Clevedon: BAAL/Multilingual Matters.
- Blommaert, Jan & Bulcaen, Chris (2000). Critical Discourse Analysis. Annual Review of Anthropology 29: 447–466.
- Blommaert, Jan, Collins, James, Heller, Monica, Rampton, Ben, Slembrouck, Stef & Jef Verschueren. Discourse and Critique. Special issue of Critique of Anthropology 21(1): 5–107 and 21(2): 117–183.
- Slembrouck, Stef (2001). Explanation, Interpretation and Critique in the Analysis of Discourse. Critique of Anthropology, 21: 33–57.
- Slembrouck, Stef (2005). Discourse, critique and ethnography: class-oriented coding in accounts of child protection. Language Sciences 27:619–650.
- Threadgold, Terry (2003). Cultural Studies, Critical Theory and Critical Discourse Analysis: Histories, Remembering and Futures. Linguistik Online 14(2).
- Tyrwhitt-Drake, Hugh (1999). Resisting the Discourse of Critical Discourse Analysis: Reopening a Hong Kong Case Study. Journal of Pragmatics 31: 1081–1088.
