= Majid KhosraviNik =

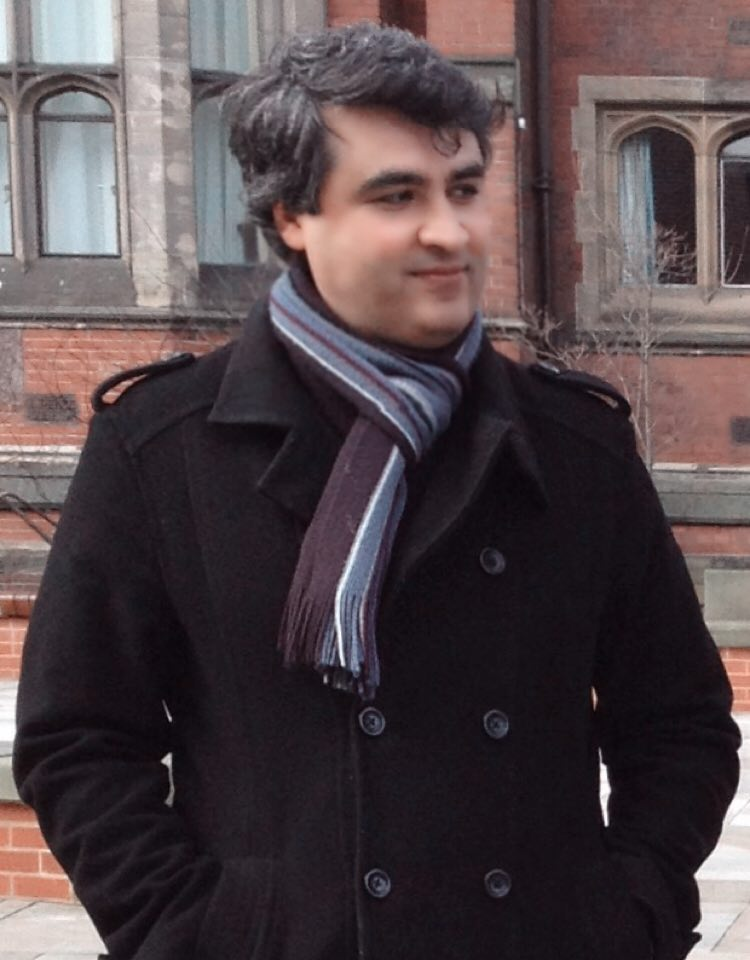
Majid KhosraviNik at Newcastle University.

Majid KhosraviNik is a reader in Digital Media and Discourse Studies at Newcastle University in the United Kingdom.

He works on digital media studies, discourse studies and politics. He has published on critical discourse studies including immigration discourses, self and other representations, national identity, right-wing populism and identity conflicts in the Middle East.

He has carried out research on identity constructions within discourses around Iran's nuclear programme, which was published in 2015.

KhosraviNik has developed his theorisation of the field around a digital critical discourse studies model under the title of Social Media Critical Discourse Studies (SM-CDS). This involves interdisciplinary examination of theoretical and methodological issues in the field including major studies on discourses of national identity in the Middle East, also known as Arabism. KhosraviNik's SM-CDS approach has been taken up in a range of emerging interdisciplinary studies, such as cyberterrorism, digital misogyny, and digital populism/nationalism.

Most recently KhosraviNik has elaborated the concept of techno-discursive design in social media, whereby algorithmic regimentation of content and practices are theorised as a fundamental context of a new dynamic of discursive practice and politics. Together with research into affects, big data, and the politics of democratisation and populism, the approach explores the critical implications of shifts in discourse formation and consumption in new media and wider consequences for a fundamental understanding of politics and democracy in both the late capitalist West as well as the developing world.

KhosraviNik was a co-founder of the Newcastle Critical Discourse Group. He sits on the editorial board of Critical Discourse Studies and Journal of Language and Politics while acting as expert assessor and referee for a range of international publishers and research grant organisations including the European Commission.

KhosraviNik received his PhD from Lancaster University under the supervision of Ruth Wodak. He was part of RASIM, an Economic and Social Research Council-funded research project, which explored the representation of migrants in the British press.

== Selected publications ==
=== Books ===
- Right-wing populism in Europe: politics and discourse. Edited with Ruth Wodak and Brigitte Mral. London: Bloomsbury. 2013. ISBN 978-1-78093-245-3.
- Discourse, identity and legitimacy: self and other in representations of Iran's nuclear programme. Amsterdam, Philadelphia: John Benjamins Publishing Company. 2015. ISBN 978-90-272-0653-4.
- Discourse of Financial Crisis and Austerity: Critical Analyses of Business and Economics Across Disciplines. Edited with Darren Kelsey, Frank Mueller, and Andrea Whittle. Taylor & Francis Group. 2017. ISBN 978-1-138-28097-7.
- Social Media, Discourse and Politics: Contemporary Spaces of Power and Critique. With Darren Kelsey. Bloomsbury Publishing. 2020. ISBN 978-1-350-00100-8.

=== Articles and book chapters ===
- "The representation of refugees, asylum seekers and immigrants in British newspapers during the Balkan conflict (1999) and the British general election (2005)". Discourse & Society. 20 (4). July 2009. doi:10.1177/0957926509104024.
- "Persian Nationalism, Identity and Anti-Arab Sentiments in Iranian Facebook Discourses: Critical Discourse Analysis and Social Media Communication". Journal of Language and Politics. 13 (4). With Mahrou Zia. January 2014. doi:10.1075/jlp.13.4.08kho.
- "Critical Discourse Analysis, Power, and New Media Discourse". In Kopytowska, Monika Weronika; Kalyango, Yusuf, eds. (2014). Why Discourse Matters: negotiating identity in the mediatized world. New York: Peter Lang. ISBN 978-1-4331-2390-0.
- "Social Media Critical Discourse Studies (SM-CDS)". In Flowerdew, John; Richardson, John, eds. (2017). Handbook of Critical Discourse Analysis. London: Routledge. ISBN 9781138826403.
- "Arabism and Anti-Persian Sentiments on Participatory Web Platforms: A Social Media Critical Discourse Study". International Journal of Communication. 11. With Nadia Sarkhoh. 2017.
- "Right Wing Populism in the West: Social Media Discourse and Echo Chambers". Insight Turkey. 19 (3). Summer 2017. doi:10.25253/99.2017193.04.
- "Social Media Techno-Discursive Design, Affective Communication and Contemporary Politics". Fudan Journal of the Humanities and Social Sciences. 11 (4). 2018. doi:10.1007/s40647-018-0226-y.
- "Critical Discourse Studies and Social Media Data". With Johann W. Unger and Ruth Wodak. In Silverman, David, ed. (2016). Qualitative Research (4th ed.). London: SAGE Publications.
