= Roger Fowler =

British linguist

Roger Fowler (1938–1999) was a world-renowned and long-serving British Linguist, and was professor of English and Linguistics at the University of East Anglia. He is well known for his works in stylistics. Together with Bob Hodge, Gunther Kress and Tony Trew, he authored the influential book Language and Control, which gave rise to the discipline of critical linguistics. He was educated at University College, London.

== Works ==
- An Introduction to Transformational Syntax
- Understanding Language: an Introduction to Linguistics
- Dictionary Of Modern Critical Terms
- Linguistic Criticism
- The Routledge Dictionary Of Literary Terms (by Peter Childs and Roger Fowler)
- Dictionary of Modern Critical Terms
- Linguistics And The Novel
- The Language of George Orwell (Language of Literature)
