= Veronika Koller =

Linguist

- Born: 2 February 1973 (age 53); Tokyo, Japan
- Known for: Critical discourse analysis

Academic background
- Education: University of Vienna
- Thesis: Metaphor clusters in business media discourse: a social cognition approach (2003)

Academic work
- Discipline: Linguist
- Sub-discipline: Critical discourse analysis
- Institutions: Lancaster University
- Website: Koller on the website of Lancaster University

Veronika Koller (born 1973) is a linguist who has lived and worked in different countries. She is Professor of Organisational Communication at the University of Southern Denmark, where her research focuses on critical discourse analysis and metaphor.

== Education ==
After attending the Katharineum (secondary school), Koller received an MA in English language and literature (with minor in Arabic language and Islamic Studies) from the University of Vienna in 1998, and a Ph.D in English linguistics from the same university in 2003 with a thesis titled "Metaphor clusters in business media discourse:a social cognition approach."

== Career ==
Between 1999 and 2001, Koller was an external lecturer for Business English at the Polytechnic of Wiener Neustadt. Between 1999 and 2002, she was also an external lecturer at the Institute of Business Development of Vienna.

In 2000, she became an assistant professor at the Department of English Business Communication of Vienna University of Economics and Business. In 2004, she was appointed lecturer in English Language at the Department of Linguistics and English Language of Lancaster University, and promoted to senior lecturer there in 2008. In 2015, she became Reader in Discourse Studies and was promoted to Professor of Discourse Studies in 2020.

Additionally, she also does occasional language consulting work for private, public and third sector clients.

== Research ==
One of Koller's best known work is Discourses of Brexit, published by Routledge in 2019. Edited along with Susanne Kopf and Marlene Miglbauer, the book provides an insight into how discourse influenced the outcome of the 2016 United Kingdom European Union membership referendum. The authors analysed political speeches on Twitter and other related platforms to analyse discourses regarding the Brexit.

== Publications ==
=== Books ===
- Koller, V., Kopf, S., & Miglbauer, M. (Eds.) (2019). Discourses of Brexit. Abingdon: Routledge. ISBN 9781138485549
- Darics, E., & Koller, V. (2018). Language in Business, Language at Work. London : Palgrave Higher Education. ISBN 9780230298422
- translated into Chinese (2014) as 商务媒体话语中的隐喻与性别 /Shang wu mei ti hua yu zhong de yin yu yu xing bie ISBN 9787544636827
- Wodak, Ruth, and Veronika Koller. (Eds) (2010) Handbook of Communication in the Public Sphere. Berlin: Mouton de Gruyter. ISBN 9783110198980
- Koller, Veronika. (2010) Lesbian Discourses: Images of a Community. New York: Routledge,. ISBN 9780415883894
- Koller, Veronika. (2008) Metaphor and Gender in Business Media Discourse A Critical Cognitive Study. Basingstoke: Palgrave Macmillan. ISBN 9780230217072
  - translated into Chinese (2014) as 商务媒体话语中的隐喻与性别 /Shang wu mei ti hua yu zhong de yin yu yu xing bie ISBN 9787544636827

=== Articles ===
- Heritage, F., & Koller, V. (2020). Incels, in-groups, and ideologies: The representation of gendered social actors in a sexuality-based online community. Journal of Language and Sexuality, 9(2), 152-178. doi:
- Koller, V., & Miglbauer, M. (2019). What Drives the Right-Wing Populist Vote? Topics, motivations and representations in an online vox pop with voters for the Alternative für Deutschland. Zeitschrift für Anglistik und Amerikanistik, 67(3), 283-306. doi:
- Darics, E., & Koller, V. (2019). Social actors “to go”: An analytical toolkit to explore agency in business discourse and communication. Business and Professional Communication Quarterly, 82(2), 214-238. doi:
- Koller, V., & Bullo, S. (2019). ‘Fight like a girl’: Tattoos as identity constructions for women living with illness. Multimodal Communication, 8(1). doi:
- Koller, V. (2018). Language awareness and language workers. Language Awareness, 27(1-2), 4-20. doi:
- Koller, V. (2017). The light within: metaphor consistency in Quaker pamphlets, 1659-2010. Metaphor and the Social World, 7(1), 5-25. doi:
- Demjen, Z., Semino, E., & Koller, V. (2016). Metaphors for 'good' and 'bad' deaths: a health professional view. Metaphor and the Social World, 6(1), 1-19. doi:
- Koller, V. (2015). The subversive potential of queer pornography: a systemic-functional analysis of a written online text. Journal of Language and Sexuality, 4(2), 254-271. doi:
- Semino, E., Demjen, Z., & Koller, V. (2014). ‘Good’ and ‘bad’ deaths: narratives and professional identities in interviews with hospice managers. Discourse Studies, 16(5), 667-685. doi:
- Koller, V. (2013). Constructing (non-)normative identities in written lesbian discourse: a diachronic study. Discourse and Society, 24(5), 551-568. doi:
- Ng, C. J. W., & Koller, V. (2013). Deliberate conventional metaphor in images: the case of corporate branding discourse. Metaphor and Symbol, 28(3), 131-147. doi:
- Merkl-Davies, D., & Koller, V. (2012). ‘Metaphoring’ people out of this world: a critical discourse analysis of a chairman’s statement of a UK defence firm. Accounting Forum, 36(3), 178-193. doi:
