= John A. Bateman =

British linguist and semiotician

- Born: 1957 (age 68–69); London, United Kingdom
- Known for: Genre and Multimodality (GeM) framework

Academic background
- Education: Edinburgh University (Ph.D. - Artificial Intelligence)

Academic work
- Discipline: Linguistics, Semiotics, Ontology
- Sub-discipline: Natural language generation; Multimodality
- Institutions: University of Bremen
- Notable works: Multimodality and genre: A foundation for the systematic analysis of multimodal documents

John Arnold Bateman (born 1957) is a British linguist and semiotician known for his research on natural language generation and multimodality. He has worked at Kyoto University, the USC Information Sciences Institute, the German National Research Center for Information Technology, Saarland University, and the University of Stirling. As of 2023, he is Professor of English Applied Linguistics at the University of Bremen in Germany.

== Key publications ==
=== Books ===
- Text generation and systemic-functional linguistics: experiences from English and Japanese (with Christian M. I. M. Matthiessen; Pinter, 1991).
- Multimodality and genre: A foundation for the systematic analysis of multimodal documents (Springer, 2008).
- Multimodal film analysis: How films mean (with Karl-Heinrich Schmidt; Routledge, 2012).
- Multimodality: Foundations, research and analysis – A problem-oriented introduction (with Janina Wildfeuer and Tuomo Hiippala; de Gruyter, 2017).

=== Articles and reports ===
- Bateman, J. A., Kasper, R. T., Moore, J. D., & Whitney, R. A. (1990). A general organization of knowledge for natural language processing: The penman upper model. Technical report, USC Information Sciences Institute.
- Bateman, J. A. (1997). Enabling technology for multilingual natural language generation: the KPML development environment. Natural Language Engineering, 3(1), 15–55.
- Bateman, J. A., Kamps, T., Kleinz, J., & Reichenberger, K. (2001). Towards constructive text, diagram, and layout generation for information presentation. Computational Linguistics, 27(3), 409–449.
- Bateman, J. A., Hois, J., Ross, R., & Tenbrink, T. (2010). A linguistic ontology of space for natural language processing. Artificial Intelligence, 174(14), 1027–1071.
