= Paul Kerswill =

Sociolinguist

Paul Kerswill FBA

Academic background
- Education: University of Cambridge

Academic work
- Discipline: Linguist
- Sub-discipline: Sociolinguistics
- Institutions: Lancaster University; University of York
- Main interests: Language variation; Multicultural London English
- Website: york.ac.uk/language-linguistic-science/people/paul-kerswill

Paul Kerswill, FBA, is a sociolinguist and emeritus professor at the University of York. After completing his undergraduate degree and doctorate at Gonville and Caius College, Cambridge, he was a research assistant from 1985 to 1986 at the University of Cambridge, before working as a lecturer at the University of Reading until his appointment in 2004 as a professor at Lancaster University. He became a professor in the department of language and linguistic science at the University of York in 2012.

== Work ==
Kerswill has written several papers and done lectures, including a TED talk, on the subject of Multicultural London English, a sociolect spoken in London.

== Honours ==
In July 2017, Kerswill was elected a Fellow of the British Academy (FBA), the United Kingdom's national academy for the humanities and social sciences.

== Selected works ==
- (Co-edited with Peter Auer and Frans Hinskens) Dialect Change: Convergence and Divergence in European languages (Cambridge University Press, 2005).
- (Co-edited with Ruth Wodak and Barbara Johnstone) The SAGE handbook of Sociolinguistics (London: Sage Publishing, 2010).
