= Theo van Leeuwen =

Dutch linguist

Theodoor Jacob "Theo" van Leeuwen FAHA (born 1947) is a Dutch linguist and one of the main developers of the sub-field of social semiotics. He is also known for his contributions to the study of Multimodality; he wrote with Gunther Kress Reading Images: The Grammar of Visual Design, one of the most influential books on the topic.

== Career ==
Van Leeuwen obtained a BA in scriptwriting and direction from the Netherlands Film Academy in Amsterdam in 1972. He married an Australian and moved to Australia later in the 1970s. Van Leeuwen worked as a director, script writer, and producer for film and television in both Holland and Australia. Van Leeuwen has also been noted as a former jazz pianist. In 1982, he finished a master's degree at Macquarie University in Sydney with a thesis on intonation. In 1992, he finished his PhD in linguistics at University of Sydney with a thesis on uniting linguistics and social theory. Van Leeuwen has taught communication theory at Macquarie University and the London College of Printing, and has taught courses at universities in Amsterdam, Vancouver, Vienna, Madrid, Stockholm, Copenhagen and Auckland. He was the dean of the Faculty of Humanities and Social Sciences at the University of Technology, Sydney until 2013, when he took a position at the University of Southern Denmark.

Van Leeuwen was elected a Fellow of the Australian Academy of the Humanities in 2007.

== Selected bibliography ==
- Kress, Gunther R., & van Leeuwen, Theo (1996). Reading Images: The Grammar of Visual Design. New York: Routledge. ISBN 0-415-31915-3.
- Speech, Music, Sound. (1999) London: Macmillan. ISBN 031222530X
- Introducing Social Semiotics (2005) London & New York: Routledge ISBN 0-415-24943-0
- Discourse and Practice: New Tools for Critical Discourse Analysis (2008) Oxford University Press ISBN 0195323319
- The Language of Colour: An Introduction (2011) London & New York: Routledge ISBN 0415495385
