= Kineikonic mode =

The kineikonic mode is a term for the moving image as a multimodal form. It indicates an approach to the analysis of film, video, television and any instance of moving image media that examines how systems of signification such as image, speech, dramatic action, music and other communicative processes work together to create meaning within the spatial and temporal frames of filming and editing.

== History ==
As a way of exploring how informal digital video production involved not only the familiar functions of filming and editing, but also the dramatization of identity, drawing from film theory and multimodality theory, Andrew Burn and David Parker coined the term kineikonic in 2003 by combining the Greek words kinein meaning "to move" and eikon meaning "image". Kineikonic analysis pays attention to how the modes of the moving image, such as speech, music, dramatic action, work together in kineikonic texts, be they film, video, videogame or animation, by observing both the modes within an individual frame and also how these modes work together throughout the temporal sequence of the text, both within and beyond the level of the shot. In this sense, the kineikonic model disputes Metz's proposal that there can be no grammar of film below the level of the shot. The concept of 'mode' stems from multimodal theory, and refers to 'a set of socially and culturally shaped resources for making meaning. Mode classifies a ‘channel’ of representation or communication for which previously no overarching name had been proposed'. By examining modes, such as sound, movement, image, and gesture, analysts can understand how the meaning of a text is constructed across and between the signifying systems of these semiotic forms.

== Kineikonic mode ==
One can understand the kineikonic mode by examining each mode individually, such as tracing the rhythm, melody or harmonic patterns of the music in and across the shots of a film. However, a central proposition of the kineikonic is a theory of how the "contributory" modes are organized by the "orchestrating modes" of filming and editing: how they have been juxtaposed to work both through the space of the film (the frames), and through the timeline of the film, the movement through time of the images, as well as the time-based modes of language, music and sound.

== Uses ==
Since its coining in 2003, the theory of the kineikonic mode has been expanded in several ways. Some have examined how tracing the kineikonic mode can show how particular youth identities are represented in youth-produced videos, such as representing a Native self through the ways in which various modes are highlighted and put together., or how primary school children use embodied modes of action and self-representation to invoke memory and construct identity. Another expansion of the theory is to examine in more detail how time works in the orchestration of the modes. Andrew Burn has expanded his own theory to discuss both this new temporal understanding of the kinekonic, but also by developing the idea of the metamodal kineikonic. The metamodal kineikonic shows how modes "nest" in one another and how this nesting can be analysed at whatever level suits the purposes of the analyst, whether it be at the orchestrating level or at the smallest level of granularity, such as tonal contour in spoken language, or a lighting change.
