= Bob Hodge (linguist) =

Australian academic, author, theorist and critic

Robert 'Bob' Hodge
- Born: 25 April 1940 (age 86); Perth, Australia
- Education: University of Western Australia, Cambridge University
- Known for: Critical linguistics, Semiotics
- Scientific career
- Fields: Linguistics, Semiotics, Cultural Theory
- Workplaces: University of Western Sydney

Robert Hodge FAHA is an Australian academic, author, theorist and critic. While best known as a semiotician and critical linguist, his work encompasses a wide, interdisciplinary range of fields including cultural theory, media studies, chaos theory, Marxism, psychoanalysis, post-colonialism, post-modernism and many other topics both within the humanities as well as science. He is currently a professor at the University of Western Sydney.

Born in Perth, Western Australia in 1940, Hodge studied English at the University of Western Australia, and graduated with first class honours in 1961. He went to Cambridge University in 1965 on a scholarship and completed a BA in 1967 and a PhD in 1972 on Intellectual History. Thereafter his working career as a lecturer and later professor took him to the University of East Anglia, Norwich 1972–1977, Murdoch University, Perth from 1977 to 1993, and the University of Western Sydney from 1993.

His line of research has taken him from studies in ancient Greek and literature, through to linguistics, to semiotics, and towards a range of topics around cultural, media, social and political criticism. Hodge's increasingly interdisciplinary approach has grown to include history, chaos theory, critical management studies, Aboriginal issues and others. Of his twenty five published books, the most well known include 'Social Semiotics', 'Language as Ideology', and 'Myths of Oz'. Other output includes numerous articles published in journals and speeches at international conferences.

As well as his work as a researcher and author, Hodge has had a long teaching career, which includes the designing and co-ordinating of courses. In 1993 he set up the course structure for UWS Hawkesbury's humanities department. As a PhD supervisor Hodge has overseen some 40 doctorates.

Hodge was elected a Fellow of the Australian Academy of the Humanities in 2001.

He currently lives in Winmalee, in the Blue Mountains west of Sydney with his wife Gabriela, and spends part of each year in Mexico City. He has three children and seven grandchildren.

== Selected publications ==
- Hodge, B. and O'Carroll, J. (2006) Borderwork in Multicultural Australia, St Leonards, NSW: Allen & Unwin.
- Hodge, B. and Caballero, Lorena (2005). Biology, semiotics, complexity: An experiment in interdisciplinarity. Semiotica 157(1/4): 477–495.
- Hodge, B. and Coronado, G. (2004) El Hipertexto Multicultural en México Posmoderno, Mexico: Porrua-CIESAS.
- Hodge, B. and Dimitrov, V. (2002) Social Fuzziology: Study of Fuzziness of Social Complexity, Germany: Springer Verlag.
- Hodge, B. and Louie, K. (1998) The Politics of Chinese Language and Culture: The Art of Reading Dragons, London & New York: Routledge.
- Hodge, B. and Kress, G. (1993) Language as Ideology, Rev. ed., London & New York: Routledge.
- Hodge, B. and Mishra, V. (1991) Dark Side of the Dream: Australian Literature and the Postcolonial Mind, St Leonards, NSW: Allen & Unwin.
- Hodge, B. and Kress, G. (1988) Social Semiotics, London: Polity Press.
- Hodge, B., Fiske, J. and Turner, G. (1987) Myths of Oz: Reading Australian Popular Culture, St Leonards, NSW: Allen & Unwin.
- Hodge, B. and Tripp, D. (1986) Children and Television, London: Polity Press, London. Spanish Trans. by Valverde, G. (1988) Barcelona: Editorial Planeta..
