= Paul Chilton =

British linguist (born 1944)

- Born: October 21, 1944 (age 81)
- Known for: Cognitive linguistics; political discourse analysis

Academic background
- Education: Cheadle Hulme School
- Alma mater: University of Oxford

Academic work
- Institutions: University of Warwick; University of East Anglia; Lancaster University

Paul Anthony Chilton (born 21 October 1944) is a British cognitive linguist and discourse analyst known for his work on conceptual metaphor, cognitive stylistics, and political discourse. Chilton developed a three-dimensional model to analyze semantic structure in natural languages, based on spatial cognition and using a formalism derived from vector geometry. This approach has been applied to discourse in terms of spatial, temporal, and modal dimensions.

Chilton is professor emeritus in the Department of Linguistics and English Language at the University of Lancaster.

== Selected publications ==
- Orwellian Language and the Media (1988)
- Security Metaphors: Cold War Discourse from Containment to Common European Home (1996)
- Analysing Political Discourse: Theory and Practice (2004)
- Language, Space and Mind: The Conceptual Geometry of Linguistic Meaning (2014)
- Religion, Language, and the Human Mind (2018, ed. with Monika Kopytowska)
