= Brigitte Mral =

Brigitte Mral (born 1953 in Germany) is a professor emeritus of rhetoric at Örebro University. She graduated in 1978 from the University of Göttingen with a master's degree, and received a Ph.D. from Uppsala University in 1986. She was active as university lecturer at Örebro University from 1987–2000, as professor of media and communication studies from 2000–2002, and as professor of rhetoric from 2002.

== Works ==
- Frühe schwedische Arbeiterdichtung: Poetische Beiträge in sozialdemokratischen Zeitungen 1882-1900 (1985)
- "Vi ha ej plats för stämningsvers...": arbetarkultur och arbetardikt före sekelskiftet (1989)
- När tidningen var till för läsarna: lokalpress på 1700-talet (1996)
- Heder och påverkan: att analysera modern retorik (with Maria Karlberg, 1998)
- Talande kvinnor: kvinnliga retoriker från Aspasia till Ellen Key (1999)
- Hur Kosovokonflikten kommunicerades: tre skrifter (with Peter Berglez and Thomas Listerman, 2003)
- "We're a peaceful nation": war rhetoric after September 11 (2004)
- Transnational and national media in global crisis: the Indian ocean tsunami (with Kristine Riegert, Maria Hellman, and Alexa Robertson, 2011)
- Bildens retorik i journalistiken (with Henrik Olinder, 2011)
- Efter Fukushima-katastrofen: kriskommunikation och mediebevakning i Sverige och Tyskland (with Orla Vigsø, 2014)
- Kritisk retorikanalys: text, bild, actio (with Marie Gelang and Emelie Bröms, 2016)
