= Gunther Kress =

British academic (1940–2019)

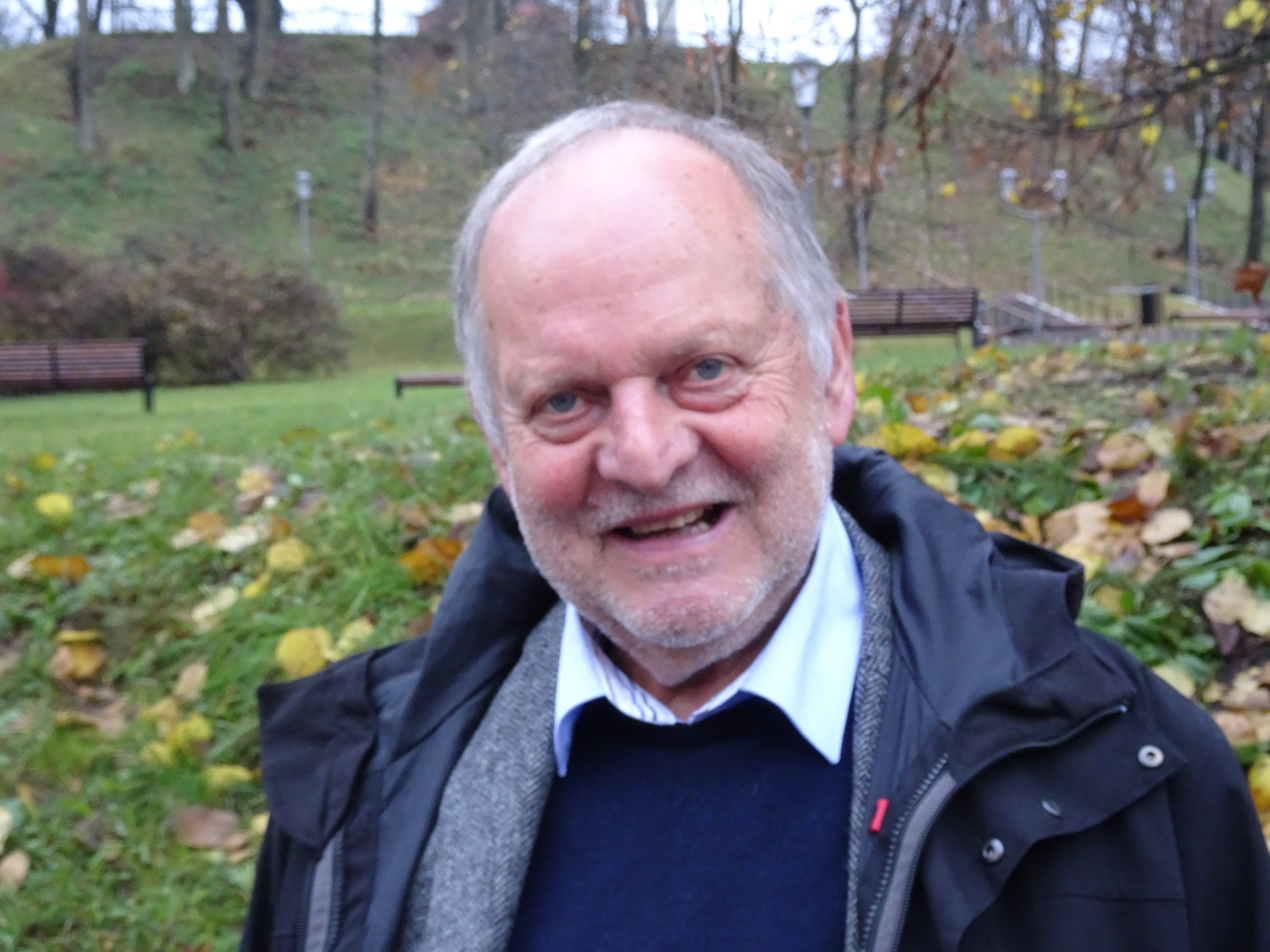
Kress in 2018 in Tartu

Gunther Rolf Kress MBE (26 November 1940 – 20 June 2019) was a linguist and semiotician. Best known for his work with Bob Hodge, he is considered one of the leading theorists in critical discourse analysis, social semiotics and multimodality, particularly in relation to their educational implications. Kress has been described as "one of the leading academics of the early 21st century".

== Biography ==
Kress was born in Nuremberg, Germany, and was educated at the University of Newcastle, Australia. He trained as a linguist in Australia and London under MAK Halliday. He is mainly known for his contributions to the study of Multimodality; he wrote with Theo van Leeuwen Reading Images: The Grammar of Visual Design, one of the most influential books on the topic. Over his career he held positions at the Universities of Kent, East Anglia (UEA), University of South Australia, University of Technology, Sydney (UTS) and the Institute of Education, University of London.

Kress was appointed Member of the Order of the British Empire (MBE) in the 2012 Birthday Honours for services to scholarship.

Gunther Kress was awarded honorary doctorates from UTS (1992), Uppsala University, Sweden (2015), and UEA (2020). He was also Professor Emeritus at UTS (1995).

== Works ==
- Kress, Gunther R. (1997). Before Writing: Rethinking the Paths to Literacy. New York: Routledge. ISBN 0-415-13804-3.
- Kress, Gunther R. (2003). Literacy in the New Media Age. New York: Routledge. ISBN 0-415-25356-X.
- Kress, Gunther R.; Van Leeuwen, Theo (2006). Reading Images: The Grammar of Visual Design. New York: Routledge. ISBN 0-415-31915-3.

== See also ==
- Visual literacy
