= Multimodality =

Concept in communication

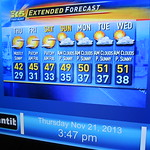
Example of multimodality: A televised weather forecast (medium) involves understanding spoken language, written language, weather specific language (such as temperature scales), geography, and symbols (clouds, sun, rain, etc.).

Multimodality is the application of multiple literacies within one medium. Multiple literacies or "modes" contribute to an audience's understanding of a composition. Everything from the placement of images to the organization of the content to the method of delivery creates meaning. This is the result of a shift from isolated text being relied on as the primary source of communication, to the image being utilized more frequently in the digital age. Multimodality describes communication practices in terms of the textual, aural, linguistic, spatial, and visual resources used to compose messages.

While all communication, literacy, and composing practices are and always have been multimodal, academic and scientific attention to the phenomenon only started gaining momentum in the 1960s. Work by Roland Barthes and others has led to a broad range of disciplinarily distinct approaches. More recently, rhetoric and composition instructors have included multimodality in their coursework. In their position statement on Understanding and Teaching Writing: Guiding Principles, the National Council of Teachers of English states that "'writing' ranges broadly from written language (such as that used in this statement), to graphics, to mathematical notation."

== Definition ==
Although multimodality discourse mentions both medium and mode, these terms are not synonymous. However, they may overlap depending on how precisely (or not) individual authors and traditions use the terms.

Gunther Kress's scholarship on multimodality is canonical with social semiotic approaches and has considerable influence in many other approaches, such as in writing studies. Kress defines 'mode' in two ways. One: a mode is a type of material resource that is socially or culturally shaped to make meaning. Images, writing, speech and gesture are all examples of modes. Two: modes are semiotic, shaped by intrinsic characteristics and their potential within their medium, as well as what is required of them by their culture or society.

Thus, every mode has a distinct historical and cultural potential and or limitation for its meaning. For example, if we broke down writing into its modal resources, we would have grammar, vocabulary, and graphic "resources" as the acting modes. Graphic resources can be further broken down into font size, type, color, size, spacing within paragraphs, etc. However, these resources are not deterministic. Instead, modes shape and are shaped by the systems in which they participate. Modes may aggregate into multimodal ensembles and be shaped over time into familiar cultural forms. A good example of this is films, which combine visual modes (in setting and in attire), modes of dramatic action and speech, and modes of music or other sounds. Studies of multimodal work in this field include van Leeuwen; Bateman and Schmidt; and Burn and Parker's theory of the Kineikonic Mode.

In social semiotic accounts, a medium is the substance in which meaning is realized and through which it becomes available to others. Mediums include video, image, text, audio, etc. Socially, a medium includes semiotic, sociocultural, and technological practices. Examples include film, newspapers, billboards, radio, television, a classroom, etc. Multimodality also makes use of the electronic medium by creating digital modes with the interlacing of image, writing, layout, speech, and video. Mediums have become modes of delivery that consider the current and future contexts.

== History ==
Multimodality (as a phenomenon) has received increasingly theoretical characterizations throughout the history of communication. Indeed, the phenomenon has been studied at least since the 4th century BC, when classical rhetoricians alluded to it with their emphasis on voice, gesture, and expressions in public speaking. However, the term was not defined with significance until the 20th century. During this time, an exponential rise in technology created many new modes of presentation. Since then, multimodality has become standard in the 21st century, applying to various network-based forms such as art, literature, social media and advertising. The monomodality, or singular mode, which used to define the presentation of text on a page has been replaced with more complex and integrated layouts. John A. Bateman says in his book Multimodality and Genre, "Nowadays… text is just one strand in a complex presentational form that seamlessly incorporates visual aspect 'around,' and sometimes even instead of, the text itself." Multimodality has quickly become "the normal state of human communication."

=== Expressionism ===
During the 1960s and 1970s, many writers looked to photography, film, and audiotape recordings in order to discover new ideas about composing. This led to a resurgence of a focus on the sensory, self-illustration known as expressionism. Expressionist ways of thinking encouraged writers to find their voice outside of language by placing it in a visual, oral, spatial, or temporal medium. Donald Murray, who is often linked to expressionist methods of teaching writing once said, "As writers it is important that we move out from that which is within us to what we see, feel, hear, smell, and taste of the world around us. A writer is always making use of experience." Murray instructed his writing students to "see themselves as cameras" by writing down every single visual observation they made for one hour. Expressionist thought emphasized personal growth, and linked the art of writing with all visual art by calling both a type of composition. Also, by making writing the result of a sensory experience, expressionists defined writing as a multisensory experience, and asked for it to have the freedom to be composed across all modes, tailored for all five senses.

=== Cognitive developments ===
During the 1970s and 1980s, multimodality was further developed through cognitive research about learning. Jason Palmeri cites researchers such as James Berlin and Joseph Harris as being important to this development; Berlin and Harris studied alphabetic writing and how its composition compared to art, music, and other forms of creativity. Their research had a cognitive approach which studied how writers thought about and planned their writing process. James Berlin declared that the process of composing writing could be directly compared to that of designing images and sound. Furthermore, Joseph Harris pointed out that alphabetic writing is the result of multimodal cognition. Writers often conceptualize their work by non-alphabetic means, through visual imagery, music, and kinesthetic feelings. This idea was reflected in the popular research of Neil Fleming, more commonly known as the neuro-linguistic learning styles. Fleming's three styles of auditory, kinesthetic, and visual learning helped to explain the modes in which people were best able to learn, create, and interpret meaning. Other researchers such as Linda Flower and John R. Hayes theorized that alphabetic writing, though it is a principal modality, sometimes could not convey the non-alphabetic ideas a writer wished to express.

== Audience ==
Every text has its own defined audience, and makes rhetorical decisions to improve the audience's reception of that same text. In this same manner, multimodality has evolved to become a sophisticated way to appeal to a text's audience. In 1984, Lisa Ede and Andrea Lunsford provided a framework for discussing audience that included addressed audiences, and invoked, or imagined, audiences. While conversations surrounding audience have continued since 1984, it is important to consider the role of audience (whether addressed or invoked) while engaging in multimodal composing.

Relying upon the canons of rhetoric in a different way than before, multimodal texts have the ability to address a larger, yet more focused, intended audience. Multimodality does more than solicit an audience; the effects of multimodality are imbedded in an audience's semiotic, generic and technological understanding.

=== Psychological effects ===
The appearance of multimodality, at its most basic level, can change the way an audience perceives information. The most basic understanding of language comes via semiotics – the association between words and symbols. A multimodal text changes its semiotic effect by placing words with preconceived meanings in a new context, whether that context is audio, visual, or digital. This in turn creates a new, foundationally different meaning for an audience. Bezemer and Kress, two scholars on multimodality and semiotics, argue that students understand information differently when text is delivered in conjunction with a secondary medium, such as image or sound, than when it is presented in alphanumeric format only. This is due to it drawing a viewer's attention to "both the originating site and the site of recontextualization". Meaning is moved from one medium to the next, which requires the audience to redefine their semiotic connections. Recontextualizing an original text within other mediums creates a different sense of understanding for the audience, and this new type of learning can be controlled by the types of media used.

Multimodality also can be used to associate a text with a specific argumentative purpose, e.g., to state facts, make a definition, cause a value judgment, or make a policy decision. Jeanne Fahnestock and Marie Secor, professors at the University of Maryland and the Pennsylvania State University, labeled the fulfillment of these purposes stases. A text's stasis can be altered by multimodality, especially when several mediums are juxtaposed to create an individualized experience or meaning. For example, an argument that mainly defines a concept is understood as arguing in the stasis of definition; however, it can also be assigned a stasis of value if the way the definition is delivered equips writers to evaluate a concept, or judge whether something is good or bad. If the text is interactive, the audience is facilitated to create their own meaning from the perspective the multimodal text provides. By emphasizing different stases through the use of different modes, writers are able to further engage their audience in creating comprehension.

=== Genre effects ===
Multimodality also obscures an audience's concept of genre by creating gray areas out of what was once black and white. Carolyn R. Miller, a distinguished professor of rhetoric and technical communication at North Carolina State University observed in her genre analysis of the Weblog how genre shifted with the invention of blogs, stating that "there is strong agreement on the central features that make a blog a blog. Miller defines blogs on the basis of their reverse chronology, frequent updating, and combination of links with personal commentary. However, the central features of blogs are obscured when considering multimodal texts. Some features are absent, such the ability for posts to be independent of each other, while others are present. This creates a situation where the genre of multimodal texts is impossible to define; rather, the genre is dynamic, evolutionary and ever-changing.

The delivery of new texts has radically changed along with technological influence. Composition now consists of the anticipation of future remediation. Writers think about the type of audience a text will be written for, and anticipate how that text might be reformed in the future. Jim Ridolfo coined the term rhetorical velocity to explain a conscious concern for the distance, speed, time, and travel it will take for a third party to rewrite an original composition. The use of recomposition allows for an audience to be involved in a public conversation, adding their own intentionality to the original product. This new method of editing and remediation is attributed to the evolution of digital text and publication, giving technology an important role in writing and composition.

=== Technological effects ===
Multimodality has evolved along with technology. This evolution has created a new concept of writing, a collaborative context keeping the reader and writer in relationship. The concept of reading is different with the influence of technology due to the desire for a quick transmission of information. In reference to the influence of multimodality on genre and technology, Professor Anne Frances Wysocki expands on how reading as an action has changed in part because of technology reform: "These various technologies offer perspectives for considering and changing approaches we have inherited to composing and interpreting pages....". Along with the interconnectedness of media, computer-based technologies are designed to make new texts possible, influencing rhetorical delivery and audience.

== Education ==
Multimodality in the 21st century has caused educational institutions to consider changing the forms of its traditional aspects of classroom education. With a rise in digital and Internet literacy, new modes of communication are needed in the classroom in addition to print, from visual texts to digital e-books. Rather than replacing traditional literacy values, multimodality augments and increases literacy for educational communities by introducing new forms. According to Miller and McVee, authors of Multimodal Composing in Classrooms, "These new literacies do not set aside traditional literacies. Students still need to know how to read and write, but new literacies are integrated." The learning outcomes of the classroom stay the same, including – but are not limited to – reading, writing, and language skills. However, these learning outcomes are now being presented in new forms as multimodality in the classroom which suggests a shift from traditional media such as paper-based text to more modern media such as screen-based texts. The choice to integrate multimodal forms in the classroom is still controversial within educational communities. The idea of learning has changed over the years and now, some argue, must adapt to the personal and affective needs of new students. In order for classroom communities to be legitimately multimodal, all members of the community must share expectations about what can be done with through integration, requiring a "shift in many educators' thinking about what constitutes literacy teaching and learning in a world no longer bound by print text."

=== Multiliteracy ===
Multilteracy is the concept of understanding information through various methods of communication and being proficient in those methods. With the growth of technology, there are more ways to communicate than ever before, making it necessary for our definition of literacy to change in order to better accommodate these new technologies. These new technologies consist of tools such as text messaging, social media, and blogs. However, these modes of communication often employ multiple mediums simultaneously such as audio, video, pictures, and animation. Thus, making content multimodal.

The culmination of these different mediums is called content convergence.

The shift away from written text as the sole mode of nonverbal communication has caused the traditional definition of literacy to evolve. While text and image may exist separately, digitally, or in print, their combination gives birth to new forms of literacy and thus, a new idea of what it means to be literate. Text, whether it is academic, social, or for entertainment purposes, can now be accessed in a variety of different ways and edited by several individuals on the Internet. In this way texts that would typically be concrete become amorphous through the process of collaboration. The spoken and written word are not obsolete, but they are no longer the only way to communicate and interpret messages. Many mediums can be used separately and individually. Combining and repurposing one mode of communication for another has contributed to the evolution of different literacies.

Communication is spread across a medium through content convergence, such as a blog post accompanied by images and an embedded video. This idea of combining mediums gives new meaning to the concept of translating a message. The culmination of varying forms of media allows for content to be either reiterated, or supplemented by its parts. This reshaping of information from one mode to another is known as transduction. As information changes from one mode to the next, our comprehension of its message is attributed to multiliteracy. Xiaolo Bao defines three succeeding learning stages that make up multiliteracy. Grammar-Translation Method, Communicative Method, and Task-Based Method. Simply put, they can be described as the fundamental understanding of syntax and its function, the practice of applying that understanding to verbal communication, and lastly, the application of said textual and verbal understandings to hands-on activities. In an experiment conducted by the Canadian Center of Science and Education, students were either placed in a classroom with a multimodal course structure, or a classroom with a standard learning course structure as a control group. Tests were administered throughout the length of the two courses, with the multimodal course concluding in a higher learning success rate, and reportedly higher rate of satisfaction among students. This indicates that applying multimodality to instruction is found to yield overall better results in developing multiliteracy than conventional forms of learning when tested in real-life scenarios.

=== Classroom literacy ===
Multimodality in classrooms has brought about the need for an evolving definition of literacy. According to Gunther Kress, a popular theorist of multimodality, literacy usually refers to the combination of letters and words to make messages and meaning and can often be attached to other words in order to express knowledge of the separate fields, such as visual- or computer-literacy. However, as multimodality becomes more common, not only in classrooms, but in work and social environments, the definition of literacy extends beyond the classroom and beyond traditional texts. Instead of referring only to reading and alphabetic writing, or being extended to other fields, literacy and its definition now encompass multiple modes. It has become more than just reading and writing, and now includes visual, technological, and social uses among others.

Georgia Tech's writing and communication program created a definition of multimodality based on the acronym, WOVEN. The acronym explains how communication can be written, oral, visual, electronic, and nonverbal. Communication has multiple modes that can work together to create meaning and understanding. The goal of the program is to ensure students are able to communicate effectively in their everyday lives using various modes and media.

As classroom technologies become more prolific, so do multimodal assignments. Students in the 21st century have more options for communicating digitally, be it texting, blogging, or through social media. This rise in computer-controlled communication has required classes to become multimodal in order to teach students the skills required in the 21st-century work environment. However, in the classroom setting, multimodality is more than just combining multiple technologies, but rather creating meaning through the integration of multiple modes. Students are learning through a combination of these modes, including sound, gestures, speech, images and text. For example, in digital components of lessons, there are often pictures, videos, and sound bites as well as the text to help students grasp a better understanding of the subject. Multimodality also requires that teachers move beyond teaching with just text, as the printed word is only one of many modes students must learn and use.

The application of visual literacy in English classroom can be traced back to 1946 when the instructor's edition of the popular Dick and Jane elementary reader series suggested teaching students to "read pictures as well as words" (p. 15). During the 1960s, a couple of reports issued by the National Council of Teachers of English suggested using television and other mass media such as newspapers, magazines, radio, motion pictures, and comic books in English classroom. The situation is similar in postsecondary writing instruction. Since 1972, visual elements have been incorporated into some popular twentieth-century college writing textbooks like James McCrimmon's Writing with a Purpose.

==== Higher education ====
Colleges and universities around the world are beginning to use multimodal assignments to adapt to the technology currently available. Assigning multimodal work also requires professors to learn how to teach multimodal literacy. Implementing multimodality in higher education is being researched to find out the best way to teach and assign multimodal tasks.

Multimodality in the college setting can be seen in an article by Teresa Morell, where she discusses how teaching and learning elicit meaning through modes such as language, speaking, writing, gesturing, and space. The study observes an instructor who conducts a multimodal group activity with students. Previous studies observed different classes using modes such as gestures, classroom space, and PowerPoints. The current study observes an instructors combined use of multiple modes in teaching to see its effect on student participation and conceptual understanding. She explains the different spaces of the classroom, including the authoritative space, interactional space, and personal space. The analysis displays how an instructors multimodal choices involve student participation and understanding. On average the instructor used three to four modes, most often being some kind of gaze, gesture, and speech. He got students to participate by formulating a group definition of cultural stereotypes. It was found that those who are learning a second language depend on more than just spoken and written word for conceptual learning, meaning multimodal education has benefits.

Multimodal assignments involve many aspects other than written words, which may be beyond an instructors education. Educators have been taught how to grade traditional assignments, but not those that utilize links, photos, videos or other modes. Dawn Lombardi is a college professor who admitted to her students that she was a bit "technologically challenged," when assigning a multimodal essay using graphics. The most difficult part regarding these assignments is the assessment. Educators struggle to grade these assignments because the meaning conveyed may not be what the student intended. They must return to the basics of teaching to configure what they want their students to learn, achieve, and demonstrate in order to create criteria for multimodal tasks. Lombardi made grading criteria based on creativity, context, substance, process, and collaboration which was presented to the students prior to beginning the essay.

Another type of visuals-related writing task is visual analysis, especially advertising analysis, which has begun in the 1940s and has been prevalent in postsecondary writing instruction for at least 50 years. This pedagogical practice of visual analysis did not focus on how visuals including images, layout, or graphics are combined or organized to make meanings.

Then, through the following years, the application of visuals in composition classroom has been continually explored and the emphasis has been shifted to the visual features—margins, page layout, font, and size—of composition and its relationship to graphic design, web pages, and digital texts which involve images, layout, color, font, and arrangements of hyperlinks. In line with the New London Group, George (2002) argues that both visual and verbal elements are crucial in multimodal designs.

Acknowledging the importance of both language and visuals in communication and meaning making, Shipka (2005) further advocates for a multimodal, task-based framework in which students are encouraged to use diverse modes and materials—print texts, digital media, videotaped performances, old photographs—and any combinations of them in composing their digital/multimodal texts. Meanwhile, students are provided with opportunities to deliver, receive, and circulate their digital products. In so doing, students can understand how systems of delivery, reception, and circulation interrelate with the production of their work.

== Multimodal communities ==
Multimodality has significance within varying communities, such as the private, public, educational, and social communities. Because of multimodality, the private domain is evolving into a public domain in which certain communities function. Because social environments and multimodality mutually influence each other, each community is evolving in its own way. This evolution is evident in the language, as discussed by Grifoni, D'Ulizia, and Ferri in their work.

=== Cultural multimodality ===
Based on these representations, communities decide through social interaction how modes are commonly understood. In the same way, these assumptions and determinations of the way multimodality functions can actually create new cultural and social identities. For example, Bezemer and Kress define modes as "socially and culturally shaped resource[s] for making meaning." According to Bezemer, "In order for something to 'be a mode,' there needs to be a shared cultural sense within a community of a set of resources and how these can be organized to realize meaning."[] Cultures that pull from different or similar resources of knowledge, understanding, and representations will communicate through different or similar modes. Signs, for instance, are visual modes of communication determined by our daily necessities.

In her dissertation, Elizabeth J. Fleitz, a PhD in English with Concentration in Rhetoric and Writing from Bowling Green State University, argues that the cookbook, which she describes as inherently multimodal, is an important feminist rhetorical text. According to Fleitz, women were able to form relationships with other women through communicating in socially acceptable literature like cook books; "As long as the woman fulfills her gender role, little attention is paid to the increasing amount of power she gains in both the private and public spheres." Women who would have been committed to staying at home could become published authors, gaining a voice in a phallogocentric society without being viewed as threats. Women revised and adapted different modes of writing to fit their own needs. According to Cinthia Gannett, author of "Gender and the Journal," diary writing, which evolved from men's journal writing, has "integrate[d] and confirm[ed] women's perceptions of domestic, social, and spiritual life, and invoke a sense of self." It is these methods of remediation that characterize women's literature as multimodal. The recipes inside of the cookbooks also qualify as multimodal. Recipes delivered through any medium, whether that be a cookbook or a blog, can be considered multimodal because of the "interaction between body, experience, knowledge, and memory, multimodal literacies" that all relate to one another to create our understanding of the recipe. Recipe exchanging is an opportunity for networking and social interaction. According to Fleitz, "This interaction is undeniably multimodal, as this network "makes do" with alternative forms of communication outside dominant discursive methods, in order to further and promote women's social and political goals." Cookbooks are only a singular example of the capacity of multimodality to build community identities, but they aptly demonstrate the nuanced aspects of multimodality. Multimodality does not just encompasses tangible components, such as text, images, sound etc., but it also draws from experiences, prior knowledge, and cultural understanding.

Another change that has occurred due to the shift from the private environment to the public is audience construction. In the privacy of the home, the family generally targets a specific audience: family members or friends. Once the photographs become public, an entirely new audience is addressed. As Pauwels notes, "the audience may be ignored, warned and offered apologies for the trivial content, directly addressed relating to personal stories, or greeted as highly appreciated publics that need to be entertained and invited to provide feedback."

=== Multimodal academic writing practises ===
In everyday life, multimodal construction and communication of meaning is ubiquitous. However, academic writing has maintained an overwhelming dominance of the linguistic resource up to the present (Blanca, 2015). The need to open the game to other possible forms of writing in the academy lies in the conviction that the semiotic resources used in the processes of academic inquiry and communication have an impact on the findings (Sousanis, 2015), since both processes are linked in the epistemic potential of writing, understood here in multimodal terms. Therefore, the idea is not about "embellishing" academic discourse with illustrative visual resources, but rather about enabling other ways of thinking, new associations; ultimately, new knowledge, arising from the interweaving of various verbal and nonverbal modes. The strategic use of page design, the juxtaposition of text in columns or of text and image, and the use of typography (in type, size, color, etc.) are just a few examples of how the semiotic potential of the genres of academic circulation can be exploited. This is linked to the possibilities of enriching the forms of academic writing by appealing to non-linear textual development in addition to linear, and by tensioning image and text in their infinite possibilities of creating meaning (Mussetta, Siragusa & Vottero, 2020; Lamela Adó & Mussetta, 2020; Mussetta, Lamela Adó & Peixoto, 2021)

=== Multimodal fiction ===
There is now an increasing number of fictional narratives that explore and graphically exploit the text and the materiality of the book in its traditional format for the construction of meaning: these are what some critics call multimodal novels (Hallet 2009, p. 129; Gibbons 2012b, p. 421, among others), but which also receive the name of visual or hybrid (Luke 2013, p. 21; Reynolds 1998, p. 169; Sadokierski 2010, p. 7). These narratives include a variety of semiotic resources and modes ranging from the strategic use of different typographies and blank spaces, to the inclusion of drawings, photos, maps and diagrams that do not correspond to the usual notion of illustration, but are an indissoluble part of the plot, with specific functions in their contribution of meaning to the work in its multiple combinations (Mussetta 2014; Mussetta, 2017a; Mussetta, 2017b; Mussetta 2017c; Mussetta, 2020).

=== Communication in business ===
In the business sector, multimodality creates opportunities for both internal and external improvements in efficiency. Similar to shifts in education to utilize both textual and visual learning elements, multimodality allows businesses to have better communication. According to Vala Afshar, this transition first started to occur in the 1980s as "technology had become an essential part of business." This level of communication has amplified with the integration of digital media and tools during the 21st century.

Internally, businesses use multimodal platforms for analytical and systemic purposes, among others. Through multimodality, a company enhances its productivity as well as creating transparency for management. Improved employee performance from these practices can correlate with ongoing interactive training and intuitive digital tools.

Multimodality is used externally to increase customer satisfaction by providing multiple platforms during one interaction. With the popularity of with text, chat and social media during the 21st century, most businesses attempt to promote cross-channel engagement. Businesses aim to increase customer experience and solve any potential issue or inquiry quickly. A company's goal with external multimodality centers around better communication in real-time to make customer service more efficient.

=== Social multimodality ===
One shift caused by multi-literate environments is that private-sphere texts are being made more public. The private sphere is described as an environment in which people have a sense of personal authority and are distanced from institutions, such as the government. The family and home are considered to be a part of the private sphere. Family photographs are an example of multimodality in this sphere. Families take pictures (sometimes captioning them) and compile them in albums that are generally meant to be displayed to other family members or audiences that the family allows. These once private albums are entering the public environment of the Internet more often due to the rapid development and adoption of technology.

According to Luc Pauwels, a professor of communication studies at the University of Antwerp, Belgium, "the multimedia context of the Web provides private image makers and storytellers with an increasingly flexible medium for the construction and dissemination of fact and fiction about their lives." These relatively new website platforms allow families to manipulate photographs and add text, sound, and other design elements. By using these various modes, families can construct a story of their lives that is presented to a potentially universal audience. Pauwels states that "digitized (and possibly digitally 'adjusted') family snapshots...may reveal more about the immaterial side of family culture: the values, beliefs, and aspirations of a group of people." This immaterial side of the family is better demonstrated through the use of multimodality on the Web because certain events and photographs can take precedence over others based on how they are organized on the site, and other visual or audio components can aid in evoking a message.

Similar to the evolution of family photography into the digital family album is the evolution of the diary into the personal weblog. As North Carolina State University professors, Carolyn Miller and Dawn Shepherd state, "the weblog phenomenon raises a number of rhetorical issues,… [such as] the peculiar intersection of the public and private that weblogs seem to invite." Bloggers have the opportunity to communicate personal material in a public space, using words, images, sounds, etc. As described in the example above, people can create narratives of their lives in this expanding public community. Miller and Shepherd say that "validation increasingly comes through mediation, that is, from the access and attention and intensification that media provide." Bloggers can create a "real" experience for their audience(s) because of the immediacy of the Internet. A "real" experience refers to "perspectival reality, anchored in the personality of the blogger."

== Digital applications ==
Information is presented through the design of digital media, engaging with multimedia to offer a multimodal principle of composition. Standard words and pictures can be presented as moving images and speech in order to enhance the meaning of words. Joddy Murray wrote in "Composing Multimodality" that both discursive rhetoric and non-discursive rhetoric should be examined in order to see the modes and media used to create such composition. Murray also includes the benefits of multimodality, which lends itself to "acknowledge and build into our writing processes the importance of emotions in textual production, consumption, and distribution; encourage digital literacy as well as nondigital literacy in textual practice. Murray shows a new way of thinking about composition, allowing images to be "sensuous and emotional" symbols of what they do represent, not focusing so much on the "conceptual and abstract."

Murray writes in his article, through the use of Richard Lanham's The Electronic World: Democracy, Technology, and the Arts, is an example of multimodality how "discursive text is in the center of everything we do," going on to say how students coexist in a world that "includes blogs, podcasts, modular community web spaces, cell phone messaging…", urging for students to be taught how to compose through rhetorical minds in these new, and not-so-new texts. "Cultural changes, and Lanham suggests, refocuses writing theory towards the image", demonstrating how there is a change in alphabet-to-icon ratios in electronic writing. One of these prime examples can see through the Apple product, the iPhone, in which "emojis" are seen as icons in a separate keyboard to convey what words would have once delivered. Another example is Prezi. Often likened to Microsoft PowerPoint, Prezi is a cloud-based presentation application that allows users to create text, embed video, and make visually aesthetic projects. Prezi's presentations zoom the eye in, out, up and down to create a multi-dimensional appeal. Users also utilize different media within this medium that is itself unique.

=== Introduction of the Internet ===
In the 1990s, multimodality grew in scope with the release of the Internet, personal computers, and other digital technologies. The literacy of the emerging generation changed, becoming accustomed to text circulated in pieces, informally, and across multiple mediums of image, color, and sound. The change represented a fundamental shift in how writing was presented: from print-based to screen-based. Literacy evolved so that students arrived in classrooms being knowledgeable in video, graphics, and computer skills, but not alphabetic writing. Educators had to change their teaching practices to include multimodal lessons in order to help students achieve success in writing for the new millennium.

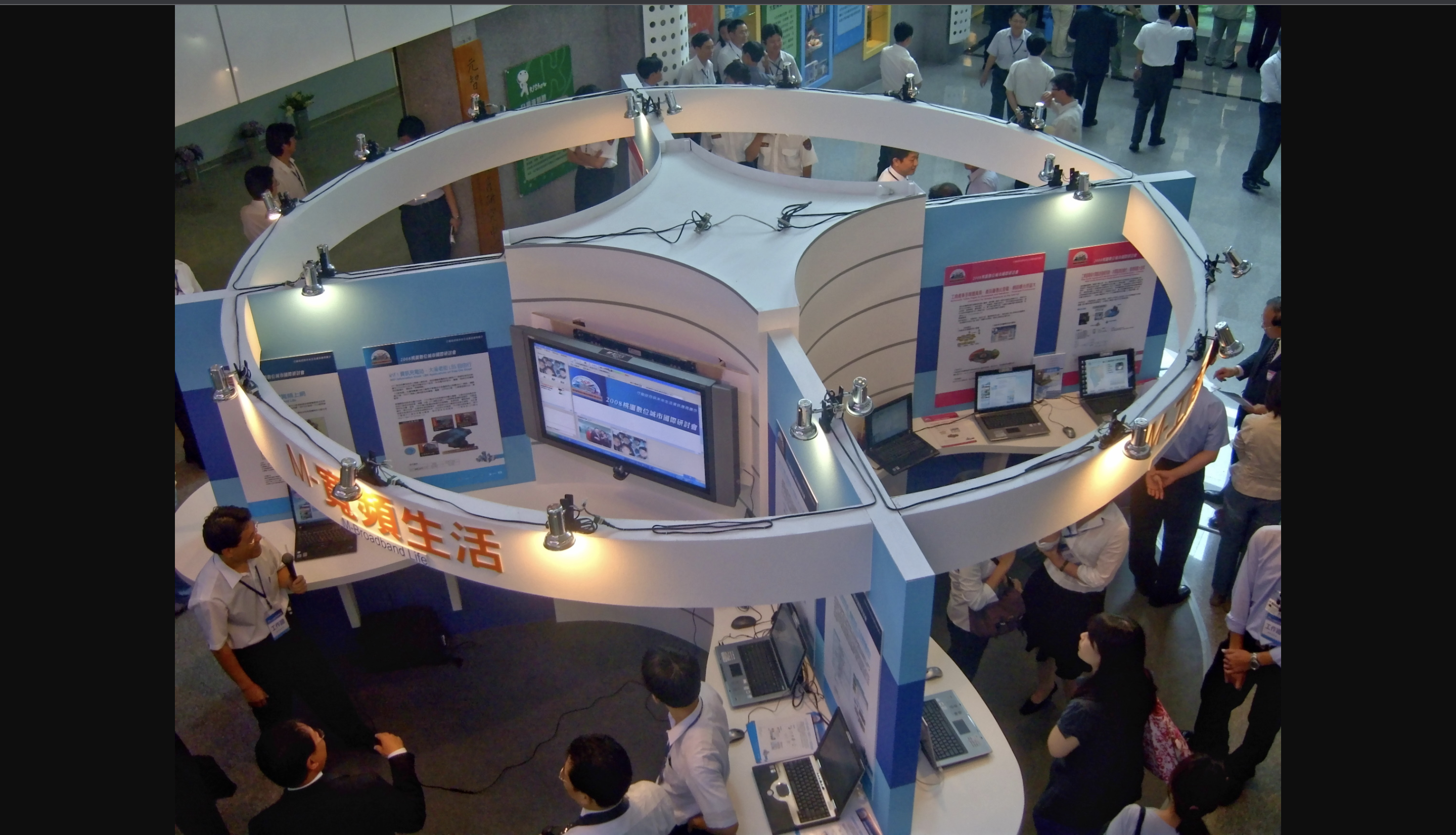

=== Accessing the audience ===
In the public sphere, multimedia popularly refers to implementations of graphics in ads, animations and sounds in commercials, and also areas of overlap. One thought process behind this use of multimedia is that, through technology, a larger audience can be reached through the consumption of different technological mediums, or in some cases, as reported in 2010 through the Kaiser Family Foundation, can "help drive increased consumption". This is a drastic change from five years ago: "8–18 year olds devote an average of 7 hours and 38 minutes to using media across a typical day (more than 53 hours a week)." With the possibility of attaining multi-platform social media and digital advertising campaigns, also comes new regulations from the Federal Trade Commission (FTC) on how advertisers can communicate with their consumers via social networks. Because multimodal tools are often tied to social networks, it is important to gauge the consumer in these fair practices. Companies like Burberry Group PLC and Lacoste S.A. (fashion houses for Burberry and Lacoste respectively) engage their consumers via the popular blogging site Tumblr; Publix Supermarkets, Inc. and Jeep engage their consumers via Twitter; celebrities and athletic teams/athletes such as Selena Gomez and The Miami Heat also engage their audience via Facebook through means of fan pages. These examples do not limit the presence of these specific entities to a single medium, but offer a wide variety of what is found for each respective source.

=== Advertising ===
Multimedia advertising is the result of animation and graphic designs used to sell products or services. There are various forms of multimedia advertising through videos, online advertising and DVDs, CDs etc. These outlets afford companies the ability to increase their customer base through multimedia advertising. This is a necessary contribution to the marketing of the products and services. For instance, online advertising is a new wave example towards the use of multimedia in advertising that provides many benefits to the online companies and traditional corporations. New technologies today have brought on an evolution of multimedia in advertising and a shift from traditional techniques. The importance of multimedia advertising is significantly increased for companies in their effectiveness to market or sell products and services. Corporate advertising concerns itself with the idea that "Companies are likely to appeal to a broader audience and increase sales through search engine optimization, extensive keyword research, and strategic linking." The concept behind the advertising platform can span across multiple mediums, yet, at its core, be centered around the same scheme.

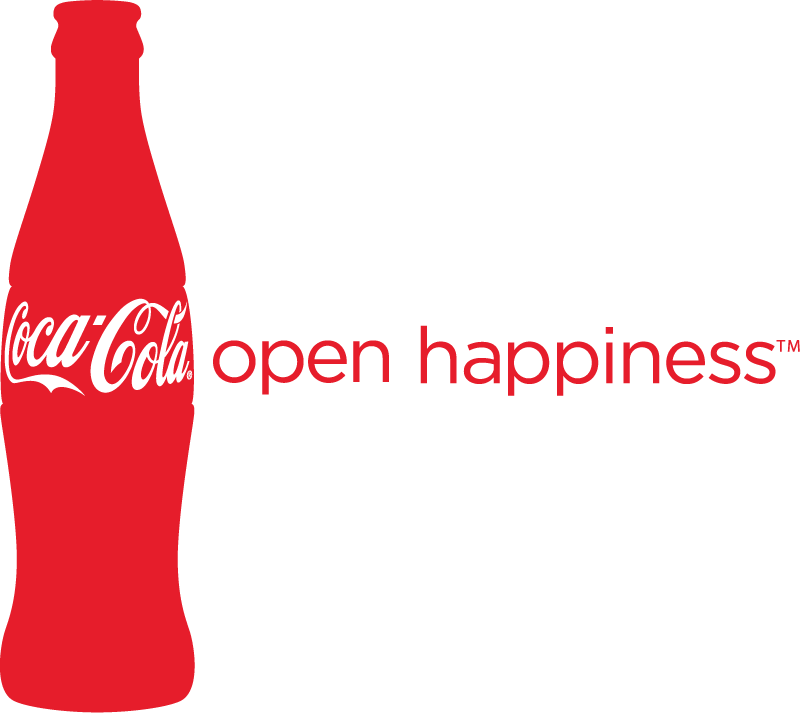
Coca-Cola's advertising logo for their 2009 Open Happiness campaign

Coca-Cola ran an overarching "Open Happiness" campaign across multiple media platforms including print ads, web ads, and television commercials. The purpose of this central function was to communicate a common message over multiple platforms to further encourage an audience to buy into a reiterated message. The strength of such multimedia campaigns with multimedia is that it implements all available mediums - any of which could prove successful with a different audience member.

=== Social media ===
Social media and digital platforms are widely used globally. These platforms frequently integrate external media, tools and technologies to expand their functionality and allow for increased user interaction.

Prior to Web 2.0's emergence, most websites listed information with little to no communication with the reader. Within Web 2.0, social media and digital platforms are utilized towards everyday living for businesses, law offices in advertising, etc. Digital platforms begin with the use of mediums along with other technologies and tools to further enhance and improve what will be created on its own platform.

Hashtags (#topic) and user tags (@username) make use of metadata in order to track "trending" topics and to alert users of their name's use within a post on a social media site. Used by various social media websites (most notably Twitter and Facebook), these features add internal linkage between users and themes. Characteristics of a multimodal feature can be seen through the status update option on Facebook. Status updates combine the affordances of personal blogs, Twitter, instant messaging, and texting in a single feature. The 2013 status update button currently prompts a user, "What's on your mind?" a change from the 2007, "What are you doing right now?" This change was added by Facebook to promote greater flexibility for the user. This multimodal feature allows a user to add text, video, image, links, and tag other users. Twitter's 140 character in a single message microblogging platform allows users the ability to link to other users, websites, and attach pictures. This new media is a platform that is affecting the literacy practice of the current generation by condensing the conversational context of the internet into fewer characters but encapsulating several media.

Other examples include the 'blog,' a term coined in 1999 as a contraction of "web log," the foundation of blogging is often attributed to various people in the mid-to-late '90s. Within the realm of blogging, videos, images, and other media are often added to otherwise text-only entries in order to generate a more multifaceted read.

=== Gaming ===
One of the current digital application of multimodality in the field of education has been developed by James Gee through his approach of effective learning through video games. Gee contends that there is a lot of knowledge about learning that schools, workplaces, families, and academics researchers should get from good computer and video games, such as a 'whole set of fundamentally sound learning principles' that can be used in many other domains, for instance when it comes to teaching science in schools.

=== Storytelling ===
Another application of multimodality is digital film-making sometimes referred to as 'digital storytelling'. A digital story is defined as a short film that incorporated digital images, video and audio in order to create a personally meaningful narrative. Through this practice, people act as film-makers, using multimodal forms of representation to design, create, and share their life stories or learning stories with specific audience commonly through online platforms. Digital storytelling, as a digital literacy practice, is commonly used in educational settings. It is also used in the media mainstream, considering the increasing number of projects that motivate members of the online community to create and share their digital stories.

== Multimodal methods in social science research ==
Multimodality is increasingly being used as a methodology in the social sciences, extending from multimodal anthropology to disciplines such as sociology and management.

For example, management researchers have highlighted the "material and visual turn" in organization research. Going above and beyond the multimodal character of ethnographic research, this growing area of research is interested in going beyond simply textual data as a single mode, for example, going beyond text to understand visual communication modes and issues such as the legitimacy of new ventures. Multimodality might involve spatial, aural, visual, sensual and other data, perhaps with multiple modes embedded in a material object.

Multimodality can be used particularly for meaning construction, for example in institutional theory, multimodal compositions can enhance the perceived validity of particular narratives. Multimodal methods may also be used to deinstitutionalize unsustainable parts of an institution in order to sustain the institution. Beyond institutional theory, we may find "multimodal historical cues" embedded in particular historical practices, highlighting the way organizations may use particular relationships to the past, and multimodal discourses that allow organizations to claim legitimate yet distinctive identities, at least with visual and verbal discourses. Sometimes work being done under the banner of multimodality spans into experimental research like that finding that the judgment of investors can be highly influenced by visual information, despite those individuals being relatively unaware of how much visual factors are influencing their decisions, an area that suggests more research needs to be done on the power of memes and disinformation in visual modes driving social movements in social media.

One interesting point seen in this growing research area is that some researchers take the stance that multimodal research is not just going beyond a focus on text as data, but argues that to truly be multimodal, the research requires more than one modality. That is, engaging "with several modes of communication (e.g. visual and verbal, or visual and material)". This seems to be a further development from researchers who align themselves with the multimodal label but then focus on a single modality such as images, for example, showing the interest in modalities beyond just textual data. Another interesting point for future research can be seen in contrasts, for example between multimodal and specifically "cross-modal" patterns.

== See also ==
- Multimodal anthropology – Anthropology in multiple media forms
- Multimodal interaction – Form of human-machine interaction using multiple modes of input/output
- Multimodal pedagogy – Teaching approach with different modes
- Digital rhetoric – Forms of communication via digital mediums
- Multisensory learning – Learning with the use of more than one sense
