= Lilie Chouliaraki =

Academic in critical linguistics

- Born: Komotini, Kingdom of Greece
- Education: University of Athens; Lancaster University
- Known for: mediated vulnerability and victimhood, post-humanitarianism, aestheticisation of violence, post-humanitarianism, media ethics, digital borders, digital witnessing
- Scientific career
- Fields: linguistics, social and cultural theory, moral philosophy, sociology, visual communication, discourse analysis
- Institutions: London School of Economics Copenhagen Business School

Lilie Chouliaraki is Chair in Media and Communications at the London School of Economics and Political Sciences (LSE). Chouliaraki’s main area of research is the mediation of human vulnerability and suffering. Her publications have pioneered an interdisciplinary research field in Media and Communications Ethics, focusing on three areas of research:

- Media Representations and Vulnerable Populations in the Global South: How media portrayals influence Western moral and political relationships with vulnerable populations in the Global South, shaping perceptions and responses to their circumstances.
- Pain, Power, and Global Hierarchies: How expressions of pain intersect with global power structures, affecting the way Western audience perceives and responds to the suffering of distant others.
- Weaponization of Human Suffering: How human suffering is manipulated and exploited by political actors for their own agendas.

Her research examines case studies on disaster news, humanitarian and human rights communication, migration as well as war and conflict journalism, approaching these in a historical perspective and across mass media and digital platforms. This research has been published in her trilogy of books on human vulnerability as a problem of communication: The Spectatorship of Suffering (2006/2011), The Ironic Spectator. Solidarity in the Age of Post-humanitarianism (2013) and The Digital Border. Migration, Technology, Power (2022, with Myria Georgiou).

Chouliaraki's research has expanded to include the history and politics of victimhood, particularly within the context of emotional capitalism, social media platforms, and far-right populism. This research cycle culminated in a trilogy of books, the first of which, appeared as Wronged. The Weaponization of Victimhood (Columbia University Press, 2024) received the Outstanding Book Award from the International Communication Association (ICA).

Building on the arguments developed in the book, the author also contributed to The Guardian, where they analyzed how populist narratives around Donald Trump and Volodymyr Zelenskyy reshape public debates on victimhood and military aid.

== Education and Career ==
Chouliaraki has a background in Languages and Linguistics, having completed both her MA and PhD in Linguistics from Lancaster University and her BA (Ptycheion) at the University of Athens. While her specialization is in Critical Linguistics and Discourse Theory and Analysis, Chouliaraki’s work has a strong interdisciplinary orientation, drawing on Social and Cultural Theory, Moral Philosophy and Sociology, Visual Communication and Social Semiotics.

From 1997 to 2003, Chouliaraki worked as a post-doc, Assistant and Associate Professor at the Departments of Philology, and of Film and Media, University of Copenhagen. In 2004, she joined the Copenhagen Business School (CBS), becoming Professor of Media and Discourse Studies in 2006. A year later, she moved to the London School of Economics and Political Science (LSE) as Chair in Media and Communication, where she remains today.

Chouliaraki maintains an Honorary Professorship at the Copenhagen Business School and has held visiting professorships at several universities, including CELSA-Sorbonne, Paris, University of Helsinki, Stockholm University, The New School of Social Research, Yale University and New York University. She also held a Professorial Fellowship at the Institute of Advanced Studies, University of Bologna in 2017. Her work has been translated in Portuguese, Polish, Danish, Greek, Italian, French, Chinese and is currently being translated in Korean. Chouliaraki's work has received funding from the Greek, Danish, Nordic and Dutch Research Councils. In 2020, Chouliaraki was announced as an ICA Fellow, in recognition of her distinguished scholarly contributions to the field of Media and Communications.

She serves on the editorial board of numerous international journals, including the International Journal of Communication, Discourse and Society; Visual Communication; Social Semiotics; Critical Discourse Studies; Crime, Media, Culture; Journal of Language and Politics, JOMEC Journal, Popular Communication, Digital Journalism.

In addition to numerous academic keynote lectures worldwide, Chouliaraki has also lectured for major NGOs, such as Amnesty International (UK, Finland) and Doctors without Borders (Netherlands) on the development of their communication agendas and strategies. She was also a judge at The Guardian’s International Development Competition, 2012 and 2013.

In 2014, in Media Ethics & Humanitarianism, Chouliaraki discussed 'the moral implications of the use of celebrities by humanitarian organisations' in the LSE’s YouTube video debates ‘Gearty Grillings’ with Prof. Conor Gearty. Her 2024 book, Wronged: The Weaponization of Victimhood is discussed, among others, in the podcast on "Borderless Voices with Dr. Ayesha Jehangir" and in a video presentation available in the LSE's Youtube Research Video Series. The book has been also reviewed in The Atlantic When Victimhood Takes a Bad-Faith Turn.

== Victimhood in the Public Sphere ==
Chouliaraki's current research focuses on the concept of victimhood and its role in the political sphere and culture wars in Western public spheres. She examines the historical and contemporary conditions under which vulnerability, a social state of openness to violence, transforms into victimhood, a form of communication that bestows the moral value of the vulnerable upon those who claim it.

Through this distinction Chouliaraki emphasizes that claiming to be a victim doesn't necessarily mean someone is actually vulnerable or oppressed and proposes that we differentiate between victimhood as “performative speech act” and vulnerability as “structural condition”. This distinction reveals the political motivations behind claims of victimhood and encourages a deeper understanding of the social context and power dynamics at play. For instance, the far Right often uses a tactical weaponization of victimhood, where it appropriates claims to pain and constructs narratives of injustice to mobilize support and further its political agenda. In this way, the far Right exploits the power of emotional appeals, most often found on social media platforms, to create communities of identification based on shared grievances.

Chouliaraki highlights the significance of examining the historical and structural context in which claims of victimhood are made, to understand the relative vulnerabilities and privileges of those claiming victim status. This intersection, Chouliaraki argues, is crucial in understanding the contemporary culture wars played out in the public spheres of western and non-western contexts. Her concept of victimhood as a speech act highlights precisely that individuals who choose to articulate their suffering in the public sphere do not all have the same status or power and so some claims – those of the most powerful- tend to be not only more tactical but also more visible and dominant than others.

The act of claiming victimhood can have both political and normative implications.

- Political implications: Claims of victimhood can be used to gain power, garner sympathy, or justify certain actions.
- Normative implications: The act of claiming victimhood can shape societal norms and values. It can influence who is deemed worthy of empathy and protection, as well as how society perceives certain issues or events.
- Both political and normative implications can therefore legitimize existing social orders and sustain hierarchies of pain and suffering.

=== Platformization of Pain ===
Today victimhood is thoroughly “platfrormized.” This means that the circulation and amplification of claims to pain is regulated by the commercial logic of social media platforms. And platforms tend to maximize the visibility of those claims that work best in their economy of attention - especially those framed by extreme emotion, outrage and hate speech. While platforms can also provide marginalized groups with the means to speak out, for instance in the case of #MeToo or #BLM, they mostly tend to amplify the claims of the already powerful, and, in this way, they “decide” who is seen and validated as a “victim” and whose suffering is deemed worthy of attention.

By selectively amplifying certain claims and silencing others, social media platforms contribute to the construction of social order and hierarchies of human lives. Chouliaraki argues that we need to deepen our critique of the political economy of platforms both by advancing evidence-driven reforms in platform regulation and by questioning the whole profit-driven architecture of platforms and working towards alternative business models oriented towards the public interest and less oriented towards private profit.

=== Reclaiming Victimhood ===
It's crucial to understand that victimhood isn't just about personal suffering; it's a political tool that can be used to reinforce existing power structures. Therefore, when confronted with claims of victimhood, Chouliaraki invites to critically analyze the situation, consider the power dynamics at play, and ask ourselves: Who is truly being harmed? Whose voices are being silenced? Only by understanding the broader context can we fully grasp the complexities of victimhood and begin the work of reclaiming it.

To achieve this, Chouliaraki advocates a cultural shift in our focus from individual and commodified experiences of pain – “my” pain, “my trauma”, which are rampant on social media - to collective narratives that contextualize pain in its political contexts, link it to systemic forms of inequalities and put forward the demand for redemption and justice especially for the most vulnerable.

== Mediation of Suffering ==
=== Disaster News and the Hierarchies of Place and Human Life ===
In The Spectatorship of Suffering, Chouliaraki explores the relationship between western spectators and vulnerable “others” in contexts of disaster, oppression and war on their news screens. Chouliaraki’s book was one of the first systematic studies in the field of Media and Communication that demonstrated how the use of language and image in Western national and trans-national television networks tell news stories that invite different degrees of moral and emotional identification with those others, depending on who they are and where they come from, and, in this way, perpetuate hierarchical patterns of place and human life along a West/non-West axis.

In chapter 4 of this book, Chouliaraki proposes a Discourse Analytic methodology, the "Analytics of Mediation", that explores three key dimensions of news texts – language-image correspondence, space-time and agency - in terms of how each participates in the representation of the scene of disaster and suffering and how each contributes to creating global hierarchies of places and human life.

Generally speaking, Chouliaraki’s work applies and advances text-based, interpretive methodologies in social research, meaning that she problematizes representations not via top-down normative argumentation but through systematic discourse and semiotic analysis of distinct configurations of text and context. Her own method for the study of media representations, the analytics of mediation, views mediation as both a semiotic achievement (as a text) and a social technology-rooted inside existing power relations. In this way, the analytics of mediation aims to preserve the modernist heritage of normative research, social criticism and change, and, at the same time, to support the mission of a bottom-up, case-by-case critical interpretation of specific communicative events.

This methodology is grounded on earlier Discourse Analytical work as developed in Discourse in Late Modernity – a book written with Norman Fairclough. In this book, Chouliaraki and Fairclough demonstrate that Critical Discourse Analysis (CDA) is an interdisciplinary approach, well-suited to empirical research and theory-building throughout the social sciences, where emphasis falls on the semiotic/linguistic/communicative components of the social world. They further advance a theoretical account of Discourse as neither a closed code nor a rigid structure but as practice, an inherent dimension of social action in the world. Further work by Chouliaraki explores discourse as practice through a discussion of three different versions of constructivist epistemologies and discusses how we can research the social world when we do not believe in 'objective' reality.

=== Humanitarian Communication and Post-humanitarianism ===
In The Ironic Spectator. Solidarity in the Age of Post-humanitarianism, Chouliaraki turns her attention to the problem of human vulnerability in the context of humanitarian and human rights communication. In this award-winning book, she examines how, in the past half century, western NGO and INGO actors have radically changed the ways they represent the suffering of vulnerable “others” as a cause for solidarity.

Looking into Amnesty International and Oxfam campaigns, charity concerts like Live Aid and Live 8, the celebrity advocacy of Audrey Hepburn and Angelina Jolie, and the BBC’s digital blog on the 2010 Haiti earthquake, Chouliaraki identifies those transformations as institutional (the commercialisation of the aid and development field), technological (the rise of social media platforms) and political (the fall of ideological narratives and the rise of individualism), and shows in detail how these transformations have shifted the ethical message of humanitarian communications from “doing good to others” to “feeling good in ourselves”. As a consequence, she argues, solidarity has today lost its moral and political character and has become a matter of consumerist choice and lifestyle. Solidarity, in other words, has turned into humanitarianism without ethics, into “post-humanitarianism”, and we as western publics have become reluctant and ego-centric yet benevolent “ironic spectators” of other people's suffering.

Chouliaraki has taken this work further in her more recent, coedited collection of state-of-the-art studies on the current challenges and future directions of the field, titled The Routledge Handbook of Humanitarian Communication (with Anne Vestergaard, 2021).

=== Migration and the Symbolic Border ===
From 2015 to 2020, Chouliaraki's interest in the communication of human vulnerability was channelled in her study on human mobility and migration. Together with Prof. Myria Georgiou, she co-led a multi-method research on the biggest migration event of the 21st century in the west - the 2015 migration “crisis” and its aftermath up to 2020 – so as to explore Europe’s digital communication practices at a time of extreme securitization, datafication and platformization of its borders. In their book The Digital Border. Migration, Technology, Power (New York University Press, 2022), Chouliaraki and Georgiou develop an interdisciplinary account of how these three processes profoundly reshape what the border is today and how it operates as an instrument of migrant exclusion and othering as much as a tool of migrant creativity and resistance.

The study encompasses, on the one hand, an ethnography of migrant arrivals on the island of Chios in 2015 and of migrant daily lives in three European capitals from 2015 to 2020, and, on the other, an extended Content and Discourse Analysis of online news headlines in eight European countries in the period July–December 2015. On the basis of this wealth of data, Chouliaraki contributed to a conceptualization of the border no longer as a fixed geographical line on the ground but as a complex, multi-material formation defined by its technological, institutional, human and discursive networks of mediation. Specifically, the digital border is a dual assemblage of socio-technical processes (AI, data-driven and embodied monitoring and classification of migrants) and of symbolic practices (linguistic and visual narratives of othering and dehumanization) both of which regulate who belongs to the national community and who does not belong - on the ground (at the territorial border) as much as on our screens (in the symbolic border).

Chouliaraki further contributed to a more refined conceptualization of the symbolic border, understood as the mediated network of multimodal narratives that form part of the border’s logics of classification and othering. These networks work to legitimize discourses of humanitarian or entrepreneurial securitization that contribute to the exclusion and marginalization of the vulnerable populations of migrants and refugees. For instance, visual and linguistic mediations of the migrant in western news reporting situate those who flee poverty or war within linguistic binaries like “victim”/“terrorist” or “entrepreneurial”/“parasitical”, and, in this way, delink migrants from their often tragic trajectories of mobility and reproduce the ideology of migration as a “crisis” that requires extraordinary measures to protect “us” from “them”. Whether on mass or social media, the narrative networks of the symbolic border profoundly dehumanize migrant lives, denying their diverse capabilities and talents, and oversimplify the story of migration, turning migrants into “illegals” who need to be contained, imprisoned and “sent back”.

== Honors and awards ==
- Outstanding Book Award 2025 from the International Communication Association (ICA).
- Honorable Mention, Journalism Studies Division, International Communication Association, 2023. Beyond Verification: Flesh witnessing and the significance of embodiment in conflict news (2023) Journalism, 23(3), 649-667.
- Nominated for Walter Benjamin Outstanding Article Award in the Field of Media Ecology of the Media Ecology Association, New York 2017. Victimhood, voice and power in digital media Simonsen K.M. and Kjaergaard J. R. (eds) Discursive Framings of Human rights: Negotiating Agency and Victimhood Abingdon: Routledge pp. 247–62.
- Outstanding Book of the Year Award, International Communication Association, 2015. 'The Ironic Spectator: Solidarity in the Age of Post-humanitarianism: Solidarity in the Age of Post-humanitarianism' (2013) Polity Press, Cambridge.
- Outstanding Paper of the Year Award, Journalism Studies Division, International Communication Association, 2014. Re-mediation, inter-mediation, trans-mediation (2012) Journalism Studies, 14 (2) pp. 267–283.
- Top Paper of the Year Award, Journalism Studies Division, International Communication Association, 2010. Ordinary witnessing in post-television news: towards a new moral imagination (2010) Critical Discourse Studies, 7 (4) pp. 305–319.

== Publications ==
Her publications include Discourse in Late Modernity (1999), The Spectatorship of Suffering (2006), The Soft Power of War (2008), Media, Organizations, Identity (2009), Self-mediation. New Media, Citizenship and Civic Selves (2012), The Ironic Spectator: Solidarity in the Age of Post-humanitarianism (2013), The Routledge Handbook of Humanitarian Communication (2022), The Digital Border: Migration, Technology, Power (2022) and Wronged: The Weaponization of Victimhood (2024).

In addition, she has published more than sixty articles in peer-reviewed journals and edited volumes. Her work is widely cited and has been published in French, Italian, Portuguese, Polish, Danish, Greek and Chinese.

=== Books ===
- Wronged: The Weaponization of Victimhood (2024) ISBN 9780231193290
- The Digital Border: Migration, Technology, Power (2022, with Myria Georgiou) ISBN 9781479873401
- The Routledge Handbook of Humanitarian Communication (2021 with Anne Vestergaard) ISBN 978-1-032-08121-2
- The Ironic Spectator: Solidarity in the Age of Post-humanitarianism (2013) ISBN 0745664334
- Self-Mediation. New Media, Citizenship and Civil Selves (2012), ISBN 1135746885
- Media Organizations, Identity (2009, with Mette Morsing), ISBN 023024839X
- The Soft Power of War (2008), ISBN 9027222339
- The Spectatorship of Suffering (2006), ISBN 1446224384
- Discourse in Late Modernity (1999, with Norman Fairclough), ISBN 0748610820

=== Selected articles ===
- Chouliaraki, Lilie (2025) Playing the victim: how Trump’s clash with Zelenskyy paved the way for the suspension of military aid, The Guardian, 5 March 2025
- Chouliaraki, Lilie (2021) Victimhood: the affective politics of vulnerability. European Journal of Cultural Studies, 24 (1). 10 - 27. ISSN 1367-5494 (open access)
- Chouliaraki, Lilie and Al-Ghazzi, Omar (2022) Beyond verification: flesh witnessing and the significance of embodiment in conflict news. Journalism, 23 (3). 649 - 667. ISSN 1464-8849
- Chouliaraki Lilie (2017) Symbolic Bordering: The self-representation of refugees in digital news. Popular Communication 15 (2): 78-94.
- Chouliaraki Lilie and Georgiou Myria (2016) Hospitability: The Communicative Architecture of Humanitarian Securitization at Europe's Borders Journal of Communication 67(2): 159–180.
- Chouliaraki, Lilie (2013) Re-mediation, inter-mediation, trans-mediation. Journalism Studies, 14 (2). pp. 267–283
- Chouliaraki, Lilie (2013) Mediating vulnerability: cosmopolitanism and the public sphere. Media, Culture and Society, 35 (1). pp. 105–112.
- Chouliaraki, Lilie (2010) Post-humanitarianism: humanitarian communication beyond a politics of pity. International journal of cultural studies, 13 (2). pp. 107–126.
- Chouliaraki Lilie and Fairclough Norman (2010) Critical Discourse Analysis in Organizational Studies: Towards an integrationist methodology. Journal of Management Studies 47 (6): 1213–1218.
- Chouliaraki, Lilie (2010) Ordinary witnessing in post-television news: towards a new moral imagination. Critical Discourse Studies, 7 (4). pp. 305–319.
- Chouliaraki, Lilie (2008) The Mediation of suffering and the vision of a cosmopolitan public. Television & new media, 9 (5). pp. 371–391. ISSN 1552-8316
- Chouliaraki, Lilie (2006) Aestheticization of suffering on television. Visual Communication, 5 (3). pp. 261–285.
- Chouliaraki, Lilie (2004) Watching 11 September: the politics of pity. Discourse & Society, 15 (2-3). pp. 185–198.

=== Selected reviews ===
- "Wronged explores how the practice of claiming harm has become the rhetorical province of the powerful". Lily Meyer in When Victimhood Takes a Bad-Faith Turn, The Atlantic.
- "In a moment when competing victim claims overwhelm public discourse, leading many to shun victim talk, Wronged gets so much right. By disentangling systemic precarity from privileged grievance, Chouliaraki recuperates the language of victimization for the most vulnerable. Wronged is a rich and sophisticated study that makes a major contribution to overcoming our current political impasse". Alyson Cole, author of The Cult of True Victimhood: From the War on Welfare to the War on Terror.
- "How have powerful and privileged men managed to pass themselves off as the victims of their own victims? This important book offers a new and convincing answer. It is essential reading for feminist scholarship, cultural and media studies, and the study of intersectionality". Eva Illouz, author of Cold Intimacies: The Making of Emotional Capitalism
- "Where has the holy sorrow of silent saints gone? Lilie Chouliaraki has an answer. It’s vanished into the market of competitive suffering, one that, like all markets, advantages the usual suspects. She urgently and eloquently calls us, in the name of a just and beautiful polity, to attend to suffering undistorted by power". John Durham Peters, author of The Marvelous Clouds: Toward a Philosophy of Elemental Media
- Wronged is an instant classic for anyone seeking to make sense of the pervasive politics of victimhood in the era of digital platforms and profound polarization. In writing that is both strikingly original and deeply moving, Chouliaraki performs the magic trick of rendering visible what was previously unseen: even if suffering is universal, the politics of pain is deeply embedded within power relations and privileges the voices of the powerful over those of the powerless. Karin Wahl-Jorgensen, author of Emotions, Media, and Politics
- "This book achieves a rare combination of opening new analytical and theoretical ground while retaining direct and lucid engagement with critical and urgent human concerns." The British Journal of Sociology
- "The Ironic Spectator, therefore, is not only an eminent work of media studies scholarship that presents a detailed and inspiring analytical framework. Its theorization of post-humanitarianism and the aesthetic and sociopolitical questions posed by new media practices deserves to earn it a wide readership in all disciplines interested in contemporary popular culture and world politics." European Journal of Communication
- "The significance of The Ironic Spectator for students and scholars of contemporary media, international relations, "development", and the broader social sciences, and, ideally, people working within media, for NGOs and INGOs, and the wider humanitarian and development sectors, cannot be overstated." Social Semiotics
- "Chouliaraki conducts an impressive, interdisciplinary analysis. She embraces the paradoxes and ambivalences of each genre, presenting a state of the art critique, and thoroughly analysing the genre's past and present form in order to suggest how the changes in communicative structure may affect how we are invited to act on distant others." The Journal of Development Studies
- "Chouliaraki qualifies as a high priestess of the representation of suffering and how we engage with distant others. She dissects with great clarity exactly what is taking place in this post humanitarian sensibility and how supporters are now being drawn in to apparently care and show solidarity with distant sufferers." LSE Review of Books
- "As refreshing and enervating as a cold mountain spring on a hot day. Chouliaraki has extraordinary ability to condense and parse complex debates briskly." Journal of International Development
- "The Spectatorship of Suffering, by Lilie Chouliaraki, rapidly became a classic, present on almost every key and suggested reading list on courses dealing with global media and international journalism… Therefore, The Ironic Spectator is a more than welcome contribution to this field, offering an opportunity to discuss one of the most pressing issues in media and journalism studies. In this book, she deals with the issue of humanitarian communication, offering a comprehensive set of arguments which makes us think truly out of the box." Digital Journalism
