= Two-tier policing =

British far-right term

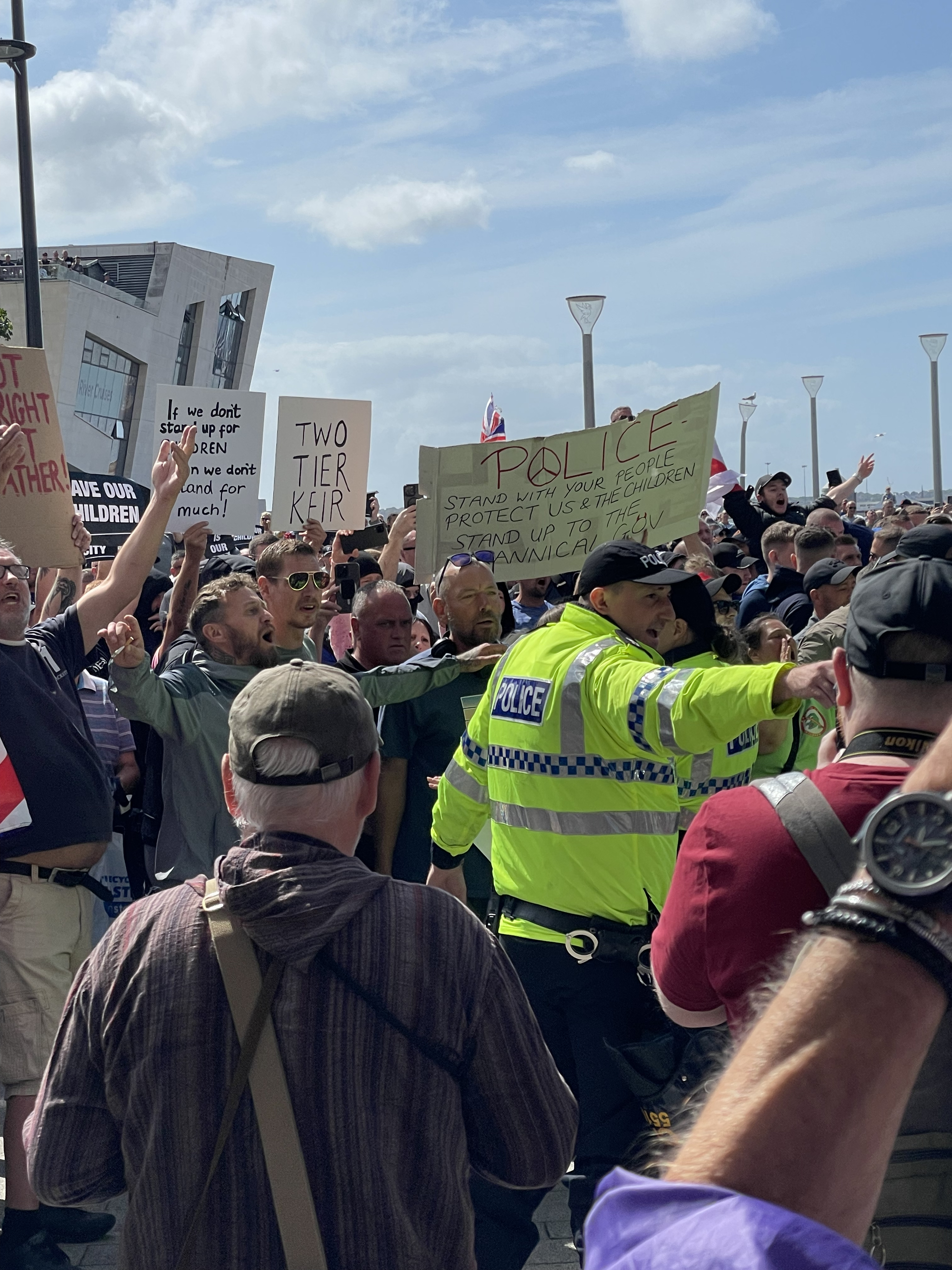
- A protestor holding a placard saying "two-tier Keir" during the 2024 United Kingdom riots
- Origin: Originally used in relation to the 1981 Brixton riot, later co-opted by Far-right activists
- Context: British policing
- Meaning: Perception that the police treat certain groups, political causes, ethnicities or demographics more harshly or more leniently than others

"Two-tier policing" is the claim that police treat white people more harshly than ethnic minorities, predominantly used by the right-wing and far-right in the United Kingdom since the early 2020s. The term gained prominence during the 2024 United Kingdom riots and following the police response to the murder of Henry Nowak.

== Origins and definitions ==
According to The Lead, the "two-tier policing" allegation was originally used to describe "over-policing and institutional racism against specific communities" around the time of the 1981 Brixton riot. Writing in the Byline Times, the journalist Nafeez Ahmed has also stated that the term was used around that time to describe police bias against black communities leading to over-policing.

In June 2026, BBC News defined the term saying: "Two-tier policing is a term used to describe the idea that some groups of people, or some behaviour (for example protests and demonstrations) are dealt with more harshly, more robustly, than others by law enforcement".

Writing for the London School of Economics's British Politics blog, media scholars Lilie Chouliaraki and Kathryn Claire Higgins in one article, and academic researcher of the far right, Aaron Winter, in another, described the term as an example of white grievance and reverse victimhood.

According to The Lead, the far-right co-opted the term to suggest that "police treat certain groups – particularly minorities – more favourably than others", adding that it is sometimes used to refer to people on the right versus the left.

The Guardian say that the two-tier policing claim first came to prominence among far-right activists, noting that Tommy Robinson used the phrase in 2012. The journalist Lizzie Dearden has traced the emergence of the term "two-tier policing" by the far right to 2019, when it began to be mentioned in Telegram groups. The term was later applied to the police handling of the Rochdale child sex abuse ring after also being taken up by anti-vaxxers during the COVID-19 pandemic.

== Mainstream usage ==
The Guardian say that claim entered the mainstream in 2023, when Home Secretary Suella Braverman accused the Metropolitan Police of "double standards" and favouring the "assertion of primacy by certain groups – particularly Islamists" – and said there was a perception they were "playing favourites" by suppressing protestors on the right but not the left, giving the examples of "lockdown objectors" compared to Black Lives Matter activists.

Conservatives also applied the concept to the police responses to the largely peaceful Gaza protests and far-right activists applied it to localised Harehills riot when compared with the response to widespread national disorder committed during the 2024 United Kingdom riots, arguing that white protesters were treated more harshly because of their race and political views. Following the latter riots, American businessman Elon Musk nicknamed then Labour Prime Minister Keir Starmer "two-tier Keir", with Reform UK leader Nigel Farage suggesting that the police had dealt with the riots more harshly than other recent protests. The Lead identified this moment as when the claim gained mainstream attention.

The issue also arose in a peaceful protest by Just Stop Oil climate protesters in July 2024, in which some were given five-year sentences while a far-right rioter who assaulted a police officer was given a three-year sentence. Dale Vince said this disparity refuted the "two-tier policing" claim and suggested that there was "two-tier sentencing" issue, calling for a review of the Police, Crime, Sentencing and Courts Act 2022 to deal with this "completely disproportionate and inconsistent" system.

After an incident at Manchester Airport in July 2024 in which a police officer was suspended from duty and four men were arrested, Nigel Farage accused Greater Manchester Police and the Crown Prosecution Service of two-tier policing for not announcing charges by October.

Following the death of a 61-year-old far-right rioter in October 2024 at HM Prison Moorland, the Reform UK politician Richard Tice was among those who alleged the rioter was sentenced too harshly.

In the summer of 2025, members of the Jewish community complained after the police refused to arrest a pro-Palestine protester who had dressed as a Holocaust concentration camp inmate but replaced the star of David with a Muslim star and crescent, in what LBC News called "the latest wave of 'two-tier' policing allegations against the Met".

Politicians representing the Democratic Unionist Party have accused the Police Service of Northern Ireland of two-tier policing in unionist areas following the 2025 Northern Ireland riots and the police response to counter-protestors at a pro-Palestine march in Scarva. The PSNI have rejected these claims.

The phrase "two-tier Keir" was also adapted as a jibe against Keir Starmer's premiership since 2024.

=== Murder of Henry Nowak ===
In the aftermath of the murder of Henry Nowak, the debate intensified. In June 2026, leader of the opposition Kemi Badenoch – disagreeing with the acting chief constable of West Midlands Police, who denied that there was two-tier policing in the West Midlands – argued that, though not necessarily intentional, it was something people were experiencing and "it is quite clear that something is not right". Around the same time, Policing minister Sarah Jones condemned anti-racist guidance by the National Police Chiefs' Council that called for police to "respond to individuals and communities according to their specific needs, circumstances and experiences, with understanding that these will be racialised and with the aim of reducing harm", calling it "wrong". Jones was unable to deny that "two-tier policing" exists in Britain and the guidance is now being reviewed by police chiefs. Nigel Farage called for "pure cold rage" in the wake of the murder, argued it was proof of two-tier policing and demanding an end to what he called "anti-white prejudice". Based on government statistics, Marvin Rees said that "race and class are key determinants to people's experience of the criminal justice system" but that, contrary to claims of bias against white people, "black people will get worse outcomes than other ethnicities from the criminal justice system".

Former Labour home secretary David Blunkett and Conservative policing minister Nick Herbert authored a report on police leadership for the College of Policing. Ahead of its publication, in a BBC interview, Blunkett said its findings suggested that across the police service there were weaknesses in leadership, morale and culture. Asked if he thought there was a problem with "two-tier policing", Blunkett said "I think there's a perception". He said "It's gone from the [1999] Macpherson report about outright racism in the force, particularly the reflections in the Met, all the way through to people saying 'oh, it's woke'", adding "We make it clear in the report that there's no room for culture wars or woke. It isn't the job of the police in our country to take sides of any sort. It's the job of the police to deliver".

The Greater Manchester police chief constable, Stephen Watson, said that there was more work required to address the perception of two-tier policing that was held by some. He also said that he did not believe that there was such a thing in his police force. He added, "I think, to an extent, we have to acknowledge that the public perceive there to be two-tier policing" and added "And whether that be historically people from minority communities or in the aftermath of the tragic Henry Nowak case, I think people perceive it now from different quarters and across the board" and "We've uncritically adopted language that persuades people that perhaps we are not as impartial as we should be and so, in a sense, I see the perception".

== As a conspiracy theory ==
The Sunday Times, The Guardian and The i Paper described two-tier policing as a conspiracy theory in 2024, and it was also described as such in a 2025 research paper by criminologists at the University of Salford and Northumbria University. Barrister Sam Fowles called claims of two-tier policing a "spurious conspiracy theory" and criticised mainstream media outlets for treating it as legitimate. He said sentences for 2024 rioters were less severe than those of left-wing protestors prosecuted for disruptive but peaceful acts. Fowles later stated that in 2025 claims of bias against white people in the justice system similarly spread "generally uncritically, across the traditional media".

== Assessments ==
While the National Police Chiefs' Council anti-racism commitment states their goal is equality of policing outcomes and is not committed to racial equality, figures show a longstanding bias against ethnic minorities, especially black people. Existing research "shows that more needs to be done by the police to better protect immigrants and ethnic minorities in the UK".

A House of Commons Library Insight article following the Summer 2024 riots said that it was "extremely difficult" to compare police responses to different protests or instances of disorder, given the vastly different scale, context and incidents involved, concluding that there is no reliable way to measure whether police respond to incidents differently due to political pressure.

A YouGov poll of 2,070 people conducted in August 2024 found partisan differences in perceptions of two-tier policing. Reform UK voters were especially likely to say that the police were more strict against the far-right and young men and more lenient towards Muslims, black people, the far-left, and climate activists. Conservative voters tended in a similar direction in some areas, but less consistently. Labour and Liberal Democrat voters most often answered "no real difference" for most groups. For example, only 16% of Labour voters and 17% of Liberal Democrat voters said police were stricter with disorder caused by the far-left, compared with 45% and 46% respectively who said there was no real difference. The exception was disorder caused by people of Black ethnicity, where Labour and Liberal Democrat voters most often said police were stricter. In each of the four voter groups, respondents were more likely to say police were stricter, rather than more lenient, toward disorder caused by the far-right and young men.

In January 2025, The Times reported that a leaked, unpublished Home Office internal review described two-tier policing as an extremist ideological belief. The Shadow Home Secretary Chris Philp, said the two-tier policing claim is part of legitimate debate not an extremist position.

An April 2025 Home Affairs Select Committee report on the police response to 2024 riots found there was "no evidence of 'two-tier policing' in officers' handling of the levels of violence and criminality during the period". In assessing claims of two-tier policing, Byline Times said "a quarter-century of official findings record racial bias in British policing running against black people – the reverse of the "two-tier" bias far-right rioters invoke". Researchers from the Royal United Services Institute argued in 2024 that there was a "two-tier approach" to extremism that treated far-right violence less seriously than Islamist violence, with far-right violence often classified as "mere 'thuggery' or hooliganism" while similar acts motivated by Islamist extremism were quickly classified as terrorism. A FOI request by Global Witness also found that the Metropolitan Police's own data revealed that environmental campaigners, with peaceful groups such as Extinction Rebellion and Just Stop Oil, were significantly more likely to be arrested and charged than agitators who engaged in far-right violence.

== See also ==
- Institutional racism in the Metropolitan Police
- Police misconduct
- Race and crime in the United Kingdom
- Selective enforcement
