= Digwa =

Digwa is a surname. Notable people with the surname include:

- Vickrum Digwa, convicted of the 2025 murder of Henry Nowak
- Sam Digwa, Botswana politician, government whip of the Parliament of Botswana since November 2024
