= Sigrid Norris =

New Zealand linguist and academic

- Born: 1961 (age 64–65); Feudingen, Germany
- Education: Georgetown University, Washington, D.C.
- Scientific career
- Thesis: A theoretical framework for multimodal discourse analysis presented via the analysis of identity construction of two women living in Germany (2002)

Sigrid Norris is a New Zealand linguist and academic. She is currently a full professor at the Auckland University of Technology.

== Academic career ==
After an undergraduate in Russian literature and a 2002 PhD titled 'A theoretical framework for multimodal discourse analysis presented via the analysis of identity construction of two women living in Germany' both from the Georgetown University, she moved to the Auckland University of Technology, rising to full professor.

== Selected works ==
- Norris, Sigrid. Analyzing multimodal interaction: A methodological framework. Routledge, 2004.
- Jones, Rodney H., and Sigrid Norris. Discourse in action: Introducing mediated discourse analysis. Routledge, 2005.
- Norris, Sigrid. Identity in (inter) action: Introducing multimodal (inter) action analysis. Vol. 4. Walter de Gruyter, 2011.
- Norris, Sigrid. "Multimodal discourse analysis: A conceptual framework." Discourse and technology: Multimodal discourse analysis (2004): 101–115.
- Norris, Sigrid. "The implication of visual research for discourse analysis: transcription beyond language." Visual communication 1, no. 1 (2002): 97–121.
- Norris, Sigrid. "Modal density and modal configurations: Multimodal actions." 2009). The Routledge handbook of Multimodal Analysis. Oxon: Routledge (2009): 78–90.
