= Pacifying the Homeland =

2019 book by Brendan McQuade

Pacifying the Homeland: Intelligence Fusion and Mass Supervision
- Author: Brendan McQuade
- Language: English
- Subject: Mass surveillance in the United States; fusion centers
- Publisher: University of California Press
- Publication date: August 6, 2019
- Pages: 304
- ISBN: 978-0-520-29975-7

Pacifying the Homeland: Intelligence Fusion and Mass Supervision is a 2019 book by Brendan McQuade about mass surveillance in the United States and specifically fusion centers. Published through the University of California Press, Pacifying the Homeland took McQuade six years to write. The author views fusion centers as a means to pacify the population, defined as a means to "create and maintain a flexible labor pool and a docile citizenry".

The book examines fusion centers, formed to further intelligence gathering between federal and state agencies, local police departments, private companies and professional associations, not as points of counterterrorism or as failures as an organization, but instead as rejigging of state-forms, defined as "institutional condensation[s] of social relations". The book received mostly positive reviews, with one reviewer comparing it to an ice-cold shower for those accustomed to intelligence gathering in everyday life. It won two book awards.

== Author, publication and background ==
The United States federal government established Department of Homeland Security and the Director of National Intelligence in 2003. Fusion centers fall under the DHS auspices. Formed to further intelligence gathering, the centers connected federal and state agencies with local police departments, private companies and professional associations. The focuses of fusion centers are on counterterrorism and crime trends, among other things. There were 79 fusion centers in the US in 2018. The author views fusion centers as a means to pacify the population, defined as a means to "create and maintain a flexible labor pool and a docile citizenry".

As of the book's publication, author Brendan McQuade was a criminology professor at the University of Southern Maine. The University of California Press published the book on August 6, 2019. According to McQuade, it took him six years to write.

== Overview ==
There are three sections in Pacifying the Homeland, each of which consists of two chapters. In chapter one, McQuade challenges scholarship that accepts fusion centers as points of counterterrorism or as failures as an organization. Instead, McQuade views fusion as a rejigging of state-forms, defined as "institutional condensation[s] of social relations". In chapter two, the author places fusion centers at the end of a history of intelligence-led policing (ILP), criminalization, and securitization. McQuade notes the change of the United States from a herrenvolk-welfare state to a post-industrialization workfare-carceral state.

Parts two and three constitute the main premises of the book. In chapter three, McQuade examines the New York State Intelligence Center (NYSIC) and the New Jersey Regional Operations Intelligence Center (ROIC) as intelligence sharing organizations that do not operate as intended. The NYSIC, for instance, competes with five intrastate Crime Analysis Centers on intelligence gathering in centers of population outside of New York City, while the ROIC has a state monopoly on intelligence within New Jersey. According to the author, the primary purpose of the NYSIC and ROIC is to "address localized pockets of perceived social disorder"; in chapter four, McQuade examines how exactly the state addresses this goal, including through ILP, warrant sweeps, and saturation patrol.

In chapter five, the author focuses on political policing and a compliant with human rights form of political policing post COINTELPRO. In chapter six, McQuade looks at poverty's moral economy. In the book's final chapter, the police abolition movement in the United States is examined, including We Charge Genocide, BYP100, and the Movement for Black Lives.

== Reception ==
In Punishment & Society, Michelle Brown of the University of Tennessee called the book "part of a wave of much needed critical policing studies that at once echo an earlier era in the study of radical criminology". Johns Hopkins University's Corey R. Payne, in the Journal of World-Systems Research, described the book as interesting in particular for world-systems analysts due to its critique of capitalism and its complex methodology, which draws on other scholars in the field. Payne goes on to state McQuade rejects a simple analysis of the ROIC as a model and the NYSIC as a laggard. Instead, Payne states the author allows for a varied analysis whereby the true composition of fusion centers can be evaluated as inherently competitive among the two states and as decentralized by design.

In the Journal of Criminal Justice Education, Kevin Revier stated "[t]hrough comprehensive research, McQuade offers a substantial contribution to studies in policing, surveillance, historical sociology, and social justice", though he stated he wanted more information on how the individuals McQuade interviewed potentially withheld or gave information. The reviewer then asks if the researcher was, at times, a surveillance object or an intelligence conveyor.

In Crime, Media, Culture, Marnie Ritchie of Pacific Lutheran University examined the book in the context of BlueLeaks, a 269 gigabyte data leak published by Distributed Denial of Secrets with most documents therein from fusion centers. Ritchie called Pacifying the Homeland "necessary to account for why [BlueLeaks] matters". In Contemporary Sociology, Kevin Walby compared Pacifying the Homeland to an ice-cold shower for individuals acclimatized to mass surveillance due to its pervasiveness in daily life. The book was a runner-up for the Surveillance Studies Network Book Award in 2020. It won the Marxist Section of the American Sociological Association's book award, as well as a book award from the American Society of Criminology's Division on Critical Criminology and Social Justice.
