= Young Bob =

Young Bob may refer to:

- Bobby Brackins (born 1998), American rapper and songwriter formerly known as "Young Bob"
- Robert Fitzsimmons Jr., American boxer known as "Young Bob Fitzsimmons"; son of Bob Fitzsimmons
- Robert M. La Follette Jr. (1895–1953), American politician
- Young Bob (activist) (born 2008), British political activist

== See also ==
- Robert Young
