= Kirpan =

Blade worn by Sikhs

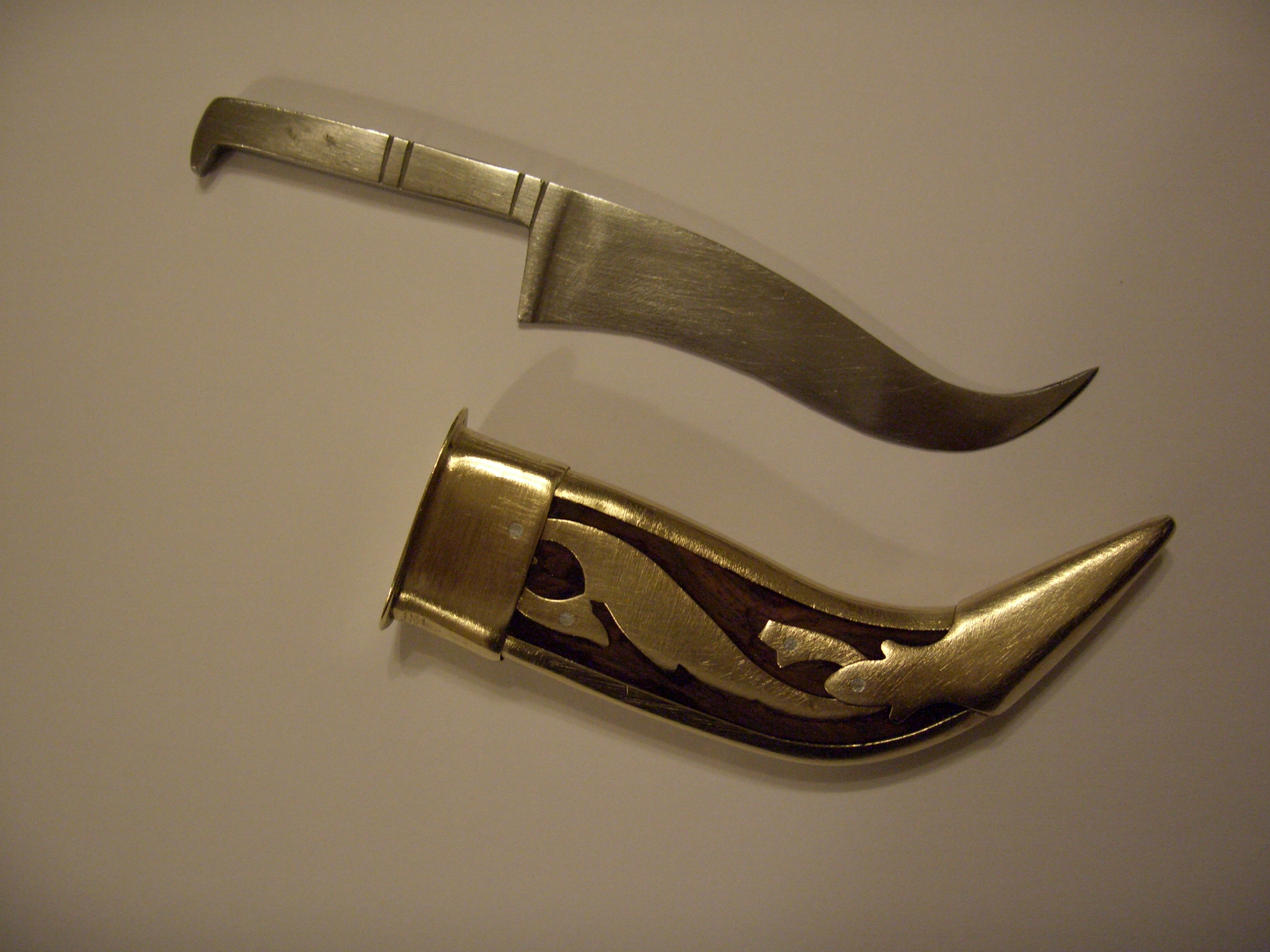
- Kirpan
- Type: Blade (dagger, or sword)
- Place of origin: Punjab region, Mughal Empire

Specifications
- Length: Usually 15–90 cm (6–35 in); most common is 15–30 cm (6–12 in)
- Blade type: Single edged
- Scabbard/sheath: The Kirpan is carried in its sheath and is usually worn in a holster known as a Gatra (cross-body shoulder belt worn over the right shoulder)

The kirpan (Punjabi: ਕਿਰਪਾਨ; pronunciation: [kɪɾpaːn]) is a blade that Khalsa Sikhs are required to wear as part of their religious uniform, as prescribed by the Sikh Code of Conduct. Traditionally, the kirpan was a full-sized talwar at around 76 cm long (30 in); however, British colonial policies and laws introduced in the 19th century reduced the length of the blade, and in the modern day, the kirpan is typically a dagger between 12 and 30 cm long (5–12 in). According to the Sikh Code of Conduct, "The length of the sword to be worn is not prescribed", but must be curved and single edged (as its original sword form was), and worn over the right shoulder and across the body. It is part of a religious commandment given by Guru Gobind Singh in 1699, founding the Khalsa order and introducing the five articles of faith (the 'five Ks') which must be worn at all times.

== Etymology ==
The Punjabi word ਕਿਰਪਾਨ, kirpān, has a folk etymology with two roots: kirpa, meaning "mercy", "grace", "compassion" or "kindness"; and aanaa, meaning "honor", "grace" or "dignity". The word is in fact derived from or related to Sanskrit कृपाण (kṛpāṇa, “sword, dagger, sacrificial knife”), ultimately from the Proto-Indo-European stem *kerp-, from *(s)ker, meaning "to cut".

== Purpose ==
Sikhs are expected to embody the qualities of a Sant Sipahi or "saint-soldier", showing no fear on the battlefield and treating defeated enemies humanely. The Bhagat further defines the qualities of a sant sipahi as one who is "truly brave ... who fights for the deprived".

Kirpans are curved and have a single cutting edge that can be sharp or blunt, which is up to the religious convictions of the wearer. They vary in size and a Sikh who has undergone the Amrit Sanskar ceremony of initiation may carry more than one; the kirpans must be made of steel or iron.

=== Symbolism ===
The kirpan represents bhagauti, meaning "primal divine power".

== History ==
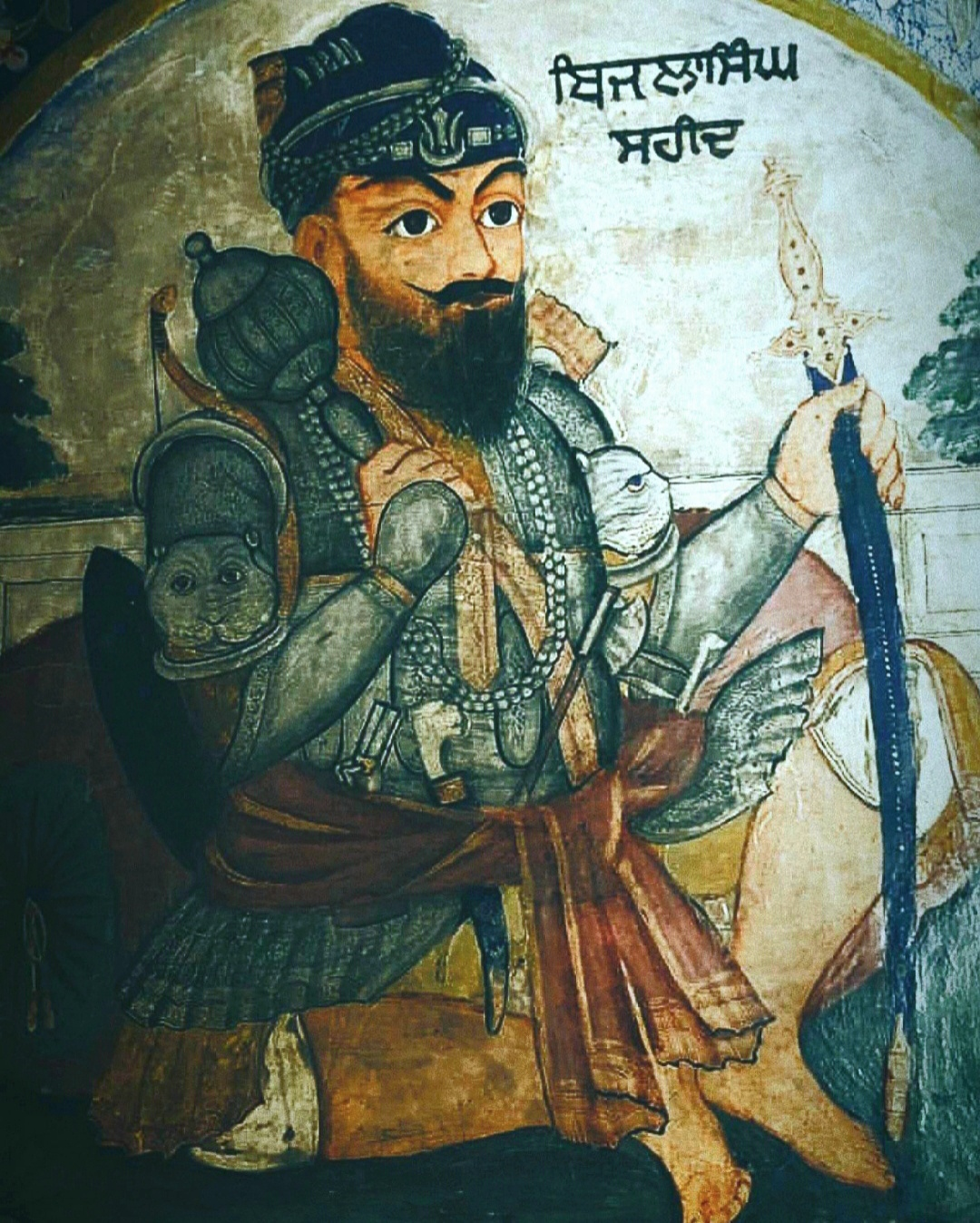
Fresco of Bijla Singh from Gurdwara Baba Atal, Amritsar, depicting him holding a kirpan on his waist.

Sikhism was founded in the 15th century in the Punjab region of Early-Modern India. At the time of its founding, this culturally rich region was governed by the Mughal Empire. During the time of the founder of the Sikh faith and its first guru, Guru Nanak, Sikhism flourished as a counter to both the prevalent Hindu and Muslim teachings. The Mughal emperor Akbar focused on religious tolerance. His relationship with the Sikh Gurus was cordial.

The relationship between the Sikhs and Akbar's successor Jahangir was not friendly. Later Mughal rulers reinstated shari'a traditions of jizya, a poll tax on non-Muslims. The Guru Arjan Dev, the fifth guru, refused to remove references to Muslim and Hindu teachings in the Adi Granth and was summoned and executed.

This incident is seen as a turning point in Sikh history, leading to the first instance of militarisation of Sikhs under Guru Arjan Dev's son Guru Hargobind. Guru Arjan Dev explained to the five Sikhs who accompanied him to Lahore, that Guru Hargobind has to build a defensive army to protect the people. Guru Hargobind trained in shashtar vidya, a form of martial arts that became prevalent among the Sikhs. He first conceptualised the idea of the kirpan through the notion of Sant Sipahi, or "saint soldiers". According to Pashaura Singh, Guru Hargobind had his warriors keep a kirpan.

The relationship between the Sikhs and the Mughals further deteriorated following the execution of the ninth Guru Tegh Bahadur by Aurengzeb, who was highly intolerant of Sikhs, partially driven by his desire to impose Islamic law. Following the executions of their leaders and facing increasing persecution, the Sikhs officially adopted militarisation for self-protection by creating later on the Khalsa; the executions also prompted formalisation of various aspects of the Sikh faith. The tenth and final guru, Guru Gobind Singh formally included the kirpan as a mandatory article of faith for all baptised Sikhs, making it a duty for Sikhs to be able to defend the needy, suppressed ones, to defend righteousness and the freedom of expression.

== Manufacturing ==
Guru Hargobind is believed to have settled expert swordsmiths around Darbar Sahib in Amritsar. With Guru Gobind Singh ordaining the kirpan as one of the five Ks, demand for kirpans increased. During the Sikh Empire, Amritsar became a hub of arms manufacturing to provide weaponry to the Sikh forces. The first power-operated kirpan factory in Amritsar came-about in the 1940s. During the 1980s, there was a brief pause of six months in manufacturing kirpans post Operation Blue Star in 1984, which negatively affected business. By the 1990s, the industry had recovered and thousands of kirpans were being produced on a daily basis by kirpan-manufacturing units.

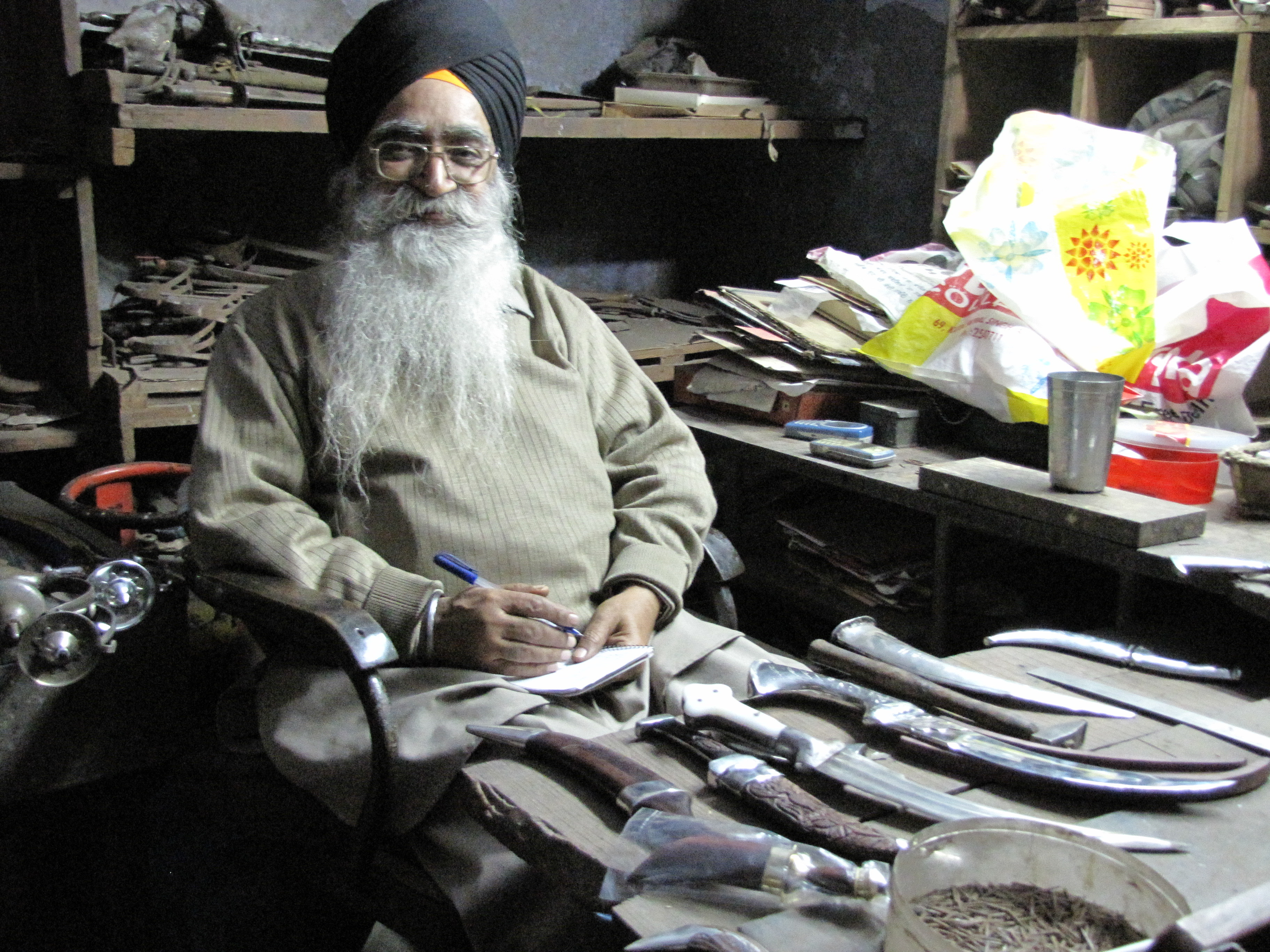
Photograph of kirpan-maker Inderjeet Singh

Over the years since the 1990s, the Amritsari kirpan-manufacturing industry, mostly located in Sultanwind Gate, Kulfi Wali Gali, Sultanwind, East Mohan Nagar, Dana Mandi, and 100 Feet Road, decreased from hundreds of workshops to thirty or forty due to competition with cheaper Chinese-made kirpans rapidly created in bulk; the manually crafted Amritsari kirpans may be of higher quality but are more expensive and numerically fewer because of their slower manufacturing processes. In the 2000s, Chinese manufacturing of kirpans nearly wiped out the local Sikh manufacturers.

== Legality ==
In modern times there has been debate about allowing Sikhs to carry a kirpan that falls under prohibitions on bladed weapons, with some countries allowing Sikhs a dispensation.

Other issues not strictly of legality arise, such as whether to allow carrying of kirpans on commercial aircraft or into areas where security is enforced.

=== Australia ===
In May 2021, the state of New South Wales imposed a ban on bringing any knives, including kirpans, onto school grounds after a 14-year-old boy allegedly stabbed a 16-year-old boy with his kirpan in a school in Sydney's north-west on 6 May. After members of Sydney's Sikh community spoke out and defended their children's rights to bring religious items to school, the state's Department of Education reversed this decision in August 2021 and implemented new guidelines around the bringing of kirpans with the following conditions:

- Kirpans must be smaller than 8.5 cm (3.3 in) in length and must have no sharp points or edges
- Kirpans must only be worn under clothing
- Kirpans must be removed during sports

In August 2023, the state of Queensland repealed a previous ban on bringing knives to schools and other public places after Australian Sikh Kamaljit Kaur Athwal took the Queensland state government to court in 2022. The Supreme Court of Queensland found that the ban, which was stated in section 55 of the Weapons Act 1990 (Qld), contravened the Racial Discrimination Act 1975 (Cth).

=== Belgium ===
On 12 October 2009, the Antwerp court of appeal declared carrying a kirpan a religious symbol, overturning a €550 fine from a lower court for "carrying a freely accessible weapon without demonstrating a legitimate reason".

=== Canada ===
In most public places in Canada a kirpan is allowed, although there have been some court cases regarding carrying on school premises. In the 2006 Supreme Court of Canada decision of Multani v Commission scolaire Marguerite‑Bourgeoys the court held that the banning of the kirpan in a school environment offended Canada's Charter of Rights and Freedoms, and that the restriction could not be upheld under s. 1 of the Charter, as per R v Oakes. The issue started when a 12-year-old schoolboy dropped a 20 cm (7.9 in) long kirpan in school. School staff and parents were very concerned, and the student was required to attend school under police supervision until the court decision was reached. A student is allowed to have a kirpan on his person if it is sealed and secured.

In September 2008, Montreal police announced that a 13-year-old student was to be charged after he allegedly threatened another student with his kirpan. The court found the student not guilty of assault with the kirpan, but guilty of threatening his schoolmates, and he was granted an absolute discharge on 15 April 2009.

On 9 February 2011, the National Assembly of Quebec unanimously voted to ban kirpans from the provincial parliament buildings. However, a similar motion proposed by the Bloc Québécois, which would have prohibited the wearing of Kirpans in federal parliamentary buildings, was later rejected.

As of 27 November 2017, Transport Canada has updated its Prohibited Items list to allow Sikhs to wear kirpans smaller than 6 cm (2.4 in) in length on all domestic and international flights (except to the United States).

As of 2024, many Khalsa Sikhs in Canada freely wear their kirpans in public. An example of this is Canadian politician Jagmeet Singh, who wears his kirpan.

=== Denmark ===
On 24 October 2006, the Eastern High Court of Denmark upheld the earlier ruling of the Copenhagen City Court that the wearing of a kirpan by a Sikh was illegal, becoming the first country in the world to pass such a ruling. Ripudaman Singh, who now works as a scientist, was earlier convicted by the City Court of breaking the law by publicly carrying a knife. He was sentenced to a 3,000 kroner fine or six days' imprisonment. Though the High Court quashed this sentence, it held that the carrying of a kirpan by a Sikh broke the law. The judge stated that "after all the information about the accused, the reason for the accused to possess a knife and the other circumstances of the case, such exceptional extenuating circumstances are found, that the punishment should be dropped, cf. Penal Code § 83, 2nd period."

Danish law allows carrying of knives (longer than 6 centimetres and non-foldable) in public places if it is for any purpose recognised as valid, including work-related, recreation, etc. The High Court did not find religion to be a valid reason for carrying a knife. It stated that "for these reasons, as stated by the City Court, it is agreed that the circumstance of the accused carrying the knife as a Sikh, cannot be regarded as a similarly recognisable purpose, included in the decision for the exceptions in weapon law § 4, par. 1, 1st period, second part."

=== India ===
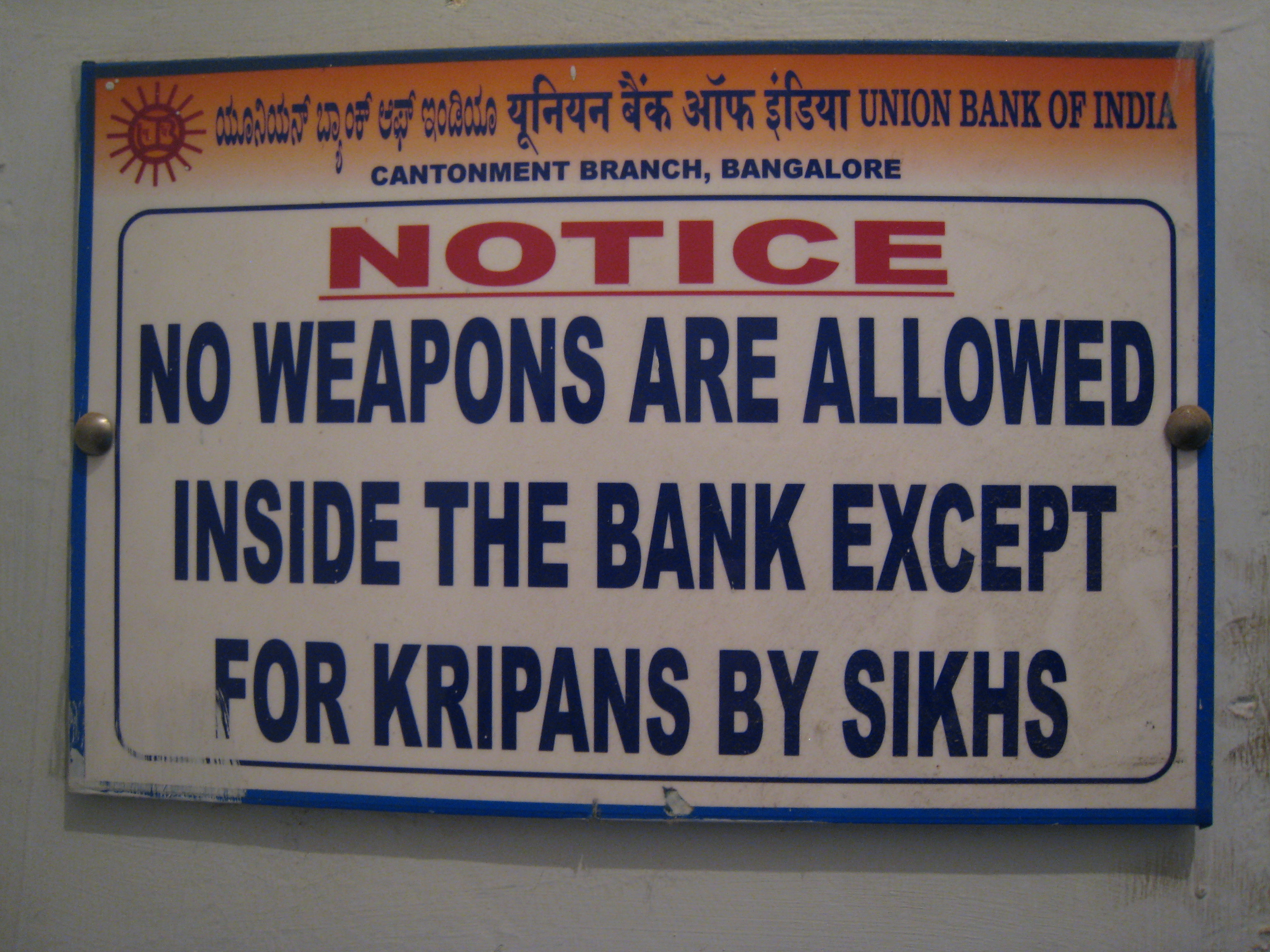
Sign at a bank in Bangalore prohibiting all weapons except kirpans.

Sikhism originated in the Indian subcontinent during the Mughal Empire era and a majority of the Sikh population lives in present-day India, where they form around 2% of its population.

Article 25 of the Indian Constitution deems the carrying of a kirpan by Sikhs to be included in the profession of the Sikh religion and not illegal. Sikhs are allowed to carry the kirpan on board domestic flights in India.

=== Italy ===
In 2015 an amritdhari Sikh was fined in the Lombard town of Goito, in Mantua province for carrying a 18 centimetres (7.1 in) kirpan "without a valid reason". In 2017 Italy's higher appeal court, the Corte di Cassazione upheld the fine. Media reports have interpreted the sentence as instituting a generalised ban on the kirpan. Amritsar Lok Sabha MP Gurjeet Singh Aulja met with Italian diplomats and was assured no generalised ban on kirpans is operative, and that the case had only specific relevance to a singular instance and carried no general applicability.

=== Sweden ===
Swedish law has a ban on "street weapons" in public places that includes knives unless the usage has a legitimate interest (for instance fishing or working). Carrying even smaller knives is not allowed, hence it is uncertain whether kirpans are within the law.

=== United Kingdom ===
As a bladed article, possession of a bladed article in a public place is illegal under section 139 of the Criminal Justice Act 1988, but there is a specific defence for a person charged to prove that he carries it for "religious reasons". There is an identical defence to the similar offence (section 139A) which relates to carrying bladed articles on school grounds. The official list of prohibited items at the London 2012 Summer Olympics venues prohibited all kinds of weapons, but explicitly allowed the kirpan.

Similar provisions exist in Scots law with section 49 of the Criminal Law (Consolidation) (Scotland) Act 1995 making it an offence to possess a bladed or pointed article in a public place. A defence exists under s.49(5)(b) of the act for pointed or bladed articles carried for religious reasons. Section 49A of the same act creates the offence of possessing a bladed or pointed article in a school, with s.49A(4)(c) again creating a defence when the article is carried for religious reasons.

The carrying of kirpans in public received renewed attention after university student Henry Nowak was murdered in 2025 using a dagger that was variously characterised as a kirpan or pesh-kabz. Independent (Note: McMurdock was elected in the 2024 United Kingdom general election as a Reform UK MP, but subsequently left the party in July 2025 to sit as an Independent MP.) MP James McMurdock asked Prime Minister Keir Starmer about the carrying of kirpans in Prime Minister's Questions on 11 June 2026.

=== United States ===
In 1994, the Ninth Circuit held that Sikh students in public school have a right to wear the kirpan. State courts in New York and Ohio have ruled in favour of Sikhs who faced the rare situation of prosecution under anti-weapons statutes for wearing kirpans, "because of the kirpan's religious nature and Sikhs' benign intent in wearing them." In New York City, a compromise was reached with the Board of Education whereby the wearing of the knives was allowed so long as they were secured within the sheaths with adhesives and made impossible to draw. The tightening of air travel security in the 21st century has caused problems for Sikhs carrying kirpans at airports and other checkpoints. As of 2016, the Transportation Security Administration (TSA) explicitly prohibits the carrying of "religious knives and swords" on one's person or in cabin baggage and requires that they be packed in checked baggage.

In 2008, American Sikh leaders chose not to attend an interfaith meeting with Pope Benedict XVI at the Pope John Paul II Cultural Center in Washington, D.C., because the United States Secret Service would have required them to leave behind the kirpan. The secretary general of the Sikh Council stated: "We have to respect the sanctity of the kirpan, especially in such interreligious gatherings. We cannot undermine the rights and freedoms of religion in the name of security." A spokesman for the Secret Service stated: "We understand the kirpan is a sanctified religious object. But by definition, it's still a weapon. We apply our security policy consistently and fairly."

== See also ==
- Gatka
- Sant Sipahi
