= Sikh practices =

Guidelines for followers of Sikhism

Sikh practices (Punjabi: ਸਿੱਖ ਅਭਿਆਸ, romanized: sikha abhi'āsa) are guidelines laid out by the Gurus for the practice of the "Sikh way of life". The Gurus emphasise that a Sikh should lead a disciplined life engaged in Naam Simran, meditation on God's name, Kirat Karo, living an honest life of a house-holder, and Vand Chaako, sharing what one has with the community. This translates into hard work, honest living, love of fellow humans and through them service of the God, the primal power. This way of life is said to have been stripped of complications, myths, jargon, rituals and exploitation of man by man in the name of religion. No benefits are gained by where and to which family the person is born to – All have to undertake the rigours of Simran (meditation) and Sevā (selfless service) to progress spiritually. The Guru Granth Sahib asks the Sikh to "Practice truth, contentment and kindness.

== Disciplined life ==
The Sikh is required to undertake the following observances:

1. Wake up very early in the morning.
2. Bathing and cleansing of the body should be performed.
3. Cleanse the mind by meditating on God.
4. Engage in family life and address your responsibilities within the family.
5. Attend to a work or study routine and earn a living by earnest means.
6. Undertake to help the less well off with monetary and/or physical help.
7. Exercise your responsibilities to the community and take active part in the maintenance and safeguard of the community.

== Personal regulations ==
Many of the personal practices of Sikhism were described in the first section of the 1950 pamphlet Sikh Rehat Maryada.

1. Wear the 5Ks
  1. Kesh – long and uncut hair and a turban to protect the hair on the head.
  2. Kanga – small comb to be used twice daily to keep the hair in clean and healthy condition.
  3. Kacchera – worn in the form of shorts to exercise self-control.
  4. Kara – a steel slave bangle on the dominant arm to remind the Sikh to always remember the Guru before undertaking any action.
  5. Kirpan – a short, often dagger-sized sword to remind the Sikh that he is to defend against repression of the weak.
2. Meditate by reciting his Gurbani and by singing his Kirtan (musical hymns).
3. Wash your mind clean with Sevā, selfless service to the community, by doing manual work at the Gurdwara such as cleaning the dishes, washing the floors, painting the walls, working in community centres, in old peoples homes, etc.
4. Practice truth at all times: To live by the Gurus instruction to practice Truth.
5. Be kind and merciful to others: Kindness is a virtue that the Sikh have been asked to exercise at all times. The Gurus have shown on many occasions how to practise and live a life of kindness and mercy.
6. Become a Gurmukh (a guru-oriented person) by doing good deeds. The Sikh Gurus repeatedly ask the dedicated Sikh to always do good deeds as shown by verses from the Guru Granth Sahib.

== Community practices ==
1. Organise Gurdwaras: As a community Sikhs set up local places of worship called Gurdwara. Services are held in the morning and evening including:
  1. Asa-Di-Vār kirtan
  2. Sukhmani Sahib Paath
  3. Akhand Path
  4. Ardas and Hukamnama
  5. Kirtan programs
  6. Naam Karan (Sikh naming ceremony)
  7. Anand Karaj (Sikh marriage ceremony)
  8. Antam Sanskar (Sikh funeral ceremony)
  9. Amrit Sanskar (Khalsa baptismal ceremony)
