= Murder of Henry Nowak =

2025 murder in Southampton, England

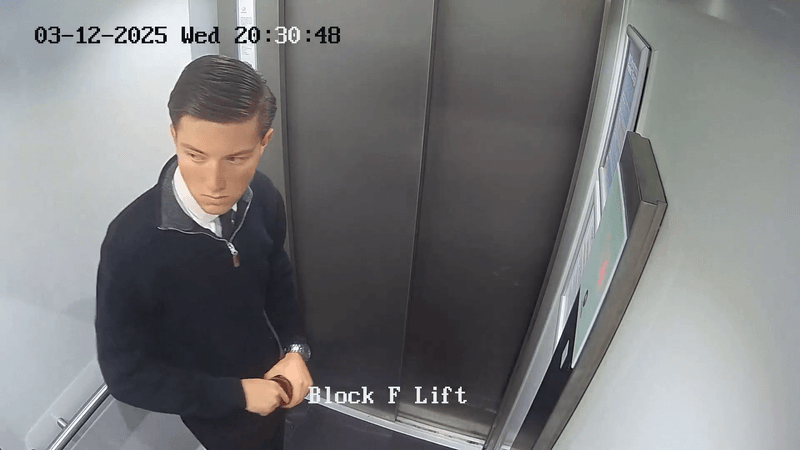
- Nowak leaving his accommodation three hours before his murder
- Location: Belmont Road, Portswood, Southampton, Hampshire, England
- Date: 3 December 2025 c. 11:30 pm
- Attack type: Stabbing
- Weapon: Dagger
- Victim: Henry Nowak
- Perpetrator: Vickrum Singh Digwa
- Convictions: Digwa: Murder; Kaur: Assisting an offender
- Sentence: Digwa: Life imprisonment (with a minimum term of 25 years); Kaur: 3 years' imprisonment
- Convicted: Vickrum Singh Digwa; Kiran Kaur (perpetrator's mother)

On 3 December 2025, Henry Nowak, (Note: Polish: [ˈxɛn.rɨ ˈnɔ.vak]) an 18‑year‑old university student, was murdered in Southampton, Hampshire, England, by 23‑year‑old Vickrum Singh Digwa. Police bodycam footage showing officers arresting Nowak as he lay dying from stab wounds sparked public outrage, parliamentary debate, and wider discussion about policing and knife laws. Nowak had been walking home when he encountered Digwa, who stabbed him five times with a 21 cm (8.3 in) dagger he claimed was carried for Sikh religious reasons.

When police officers from Hampshire and Isle of Wight Constabulary arrived at the scene, Nowak was lying on the ground saying he had been stabbed and could not breathe. Digwa denied having stabbed Nowak, and falsely told the officers that Nowak had assaulted him and used a racial slur, prompting the officers to handcuff and arrest Nowak moments before he lost consciousness and died. Following the death of Nowak, the police force referred itself to the IOPC.

Digwa was convicted of murder in May 2026 and sentenced to life imprisonment the following month, with a minimum term of 21 years, increased to 25 years on appeal. His mother was convicted of assisting an offender by hiding the dagger, and further charges were brought against Digwa and other family members over weapons found at their home.

The release of the police bodycam footage prompted political controversy, a PCC‑commissioned enquiry, and protests in Southampton. Nowak's family called for a review of knife laws and Sikh exemptions, while politicians debated policing standards and allegations of "two‑tier policing". On 26 October 2026, the Home Secretary announced an independent review into the circumstances surrounding the murder.

== Background ==
Henry Nowak was an 18-year-old student in his first year studying Accounting and Finance at the University of Southampton. He was born in Westminster and grew up in Chafford Hundred, a suburb of Grays, Essex, where he attended Harris Academy Chafford Hundred. One of four siblings, he was especially close to his older sister Olivia. At Southampton, he was a member of two university football teams and worked part-time in the local Morrisons.

Nowak's father was of Polish descent, and Nowak himself was a dual citizen of the United Kingdom and Poland.

== Murder ==
CCTV footage of Nowak entering and leaving the Hobbit pub in Bevois Valley

On the evening of 3 December 2025, Nowak left his student accommodation in Portswood at 8:30 pm to celebrate the end of term with his football team-mates. At about 11:00 pm, CCTV recorded him entering The Hobbit pub in Bevois Valley alone and leaving a few minutes later without ordering a drink. Although he had consumed alcohol earlier, he was under the drink-drive limit. As he walked home, he sent messages and videos to friends on Snapchat. On Belmont Road, near the junction with St Denys Road, he encountered Digwa, who lived with his parents nearby. A Snapchat video recovered from Nowak's phone captured him saying "Hello car" and singing to himself before yawning, while Digwa walked away. Nowak then said, "Innit bad man, what bad man. You're a bad man, say you're a bad man, go on." to which Digwa replied, "I am a bad man". The recording ended when Digwa snatched Nowak's phone.

Digwa then stabbed Nowak, inflicting a fatal chest wound, two deep stab wounds to his legs, a knife‑tip wound to his abdomen and a cut to his face. There were no eyewitnesses, but neighbours heard Nowak saying he had been stabbed and was dying and called the police. One neighbour heard shouts of "you're not getting away, big man" and "I'm going to slash you" or "I'm going to smash you". Another neighbour heard Nowak say "I am not a racist". Digwa filmed Nowak as he attempted to flee by climbing a fence and collapsed. Digwa's brother, Gurpreet Digwa, and their parents arrived before the police. Digwa told his mother, Kiran Kaur, to take the knife and hide it at their home, which she did. His brother called the police, falsely claiming that Nowak had "verbally attacked my brother racially", with Nowak heard in the background saying, "No I didn't". Digwa's brother also said that no weapons had been used, and said the victim needed medical attention.

Four officers from Hampshire and Isle of Wight Constabulary attended. When the first officers arrived, they spoke to Digwa while Nowak lay mortally injured on the ground. Digwa told them that Nowak was drunk, had punched him, used a racial slur and pulled off his turban, and showed them what he said was a swollen eye and small bruise. An officer dragged Nowak across the gravel. Bodycam footage released on 2 June 2026, with the permission of Nowak's family, showed Nowak repeatedly telling officers that he had been stabbed and could not breathe. In response, one officer said, "Don't think you have, mate". The officers pulled Nowak's hands behind his back and handcuffed him. An officer briefly lifted his top around the waist. Digwa said, "he hasn't been stabbed, I don't know why he's saying that", and an officer replied, "I know but we have to check don't we". Nowak said, "Please brother, I can't breathe". These were his last words. He was arrested and read his rights before an officer realised he was unresponsive; the handcuffs were removed, an ambulance called and CPR administered. At 11:55 pm Digwa was arrested on suspicion of attempted murder. He was not handcuffed. Nowak was pronounced dead at 12:37 am.

On 4 December, after Nowak's death was confirmed, Digwa was told in his cell that he was being rearrested on suspicion of murder. His custody was formally extended in court the following day. Police allowed Digwa to sit with his brother in a police van on the way to court and covertly recorded their conversation in Punjabi. Digwa told his brother that he had stabbed Nowak and showed him where he had inflicted the wounds. His brother said, "You should have hit him or beaten him up. Why did you use the kirpan?", to which Digwa responded, "I'm a fool. I'm an idiot". His brother advised him to claim self‑defence, and Digwa said he would not be able to do so if there were security cameras on the street. The judge later said in sentencing Digwa that a number of aggravating factors would not have applied had Digwa told the police what he had said to his brother.

Three days after Nowak died, police prepared an official statement describing him as the aggressor, but changed the wording after protest from his family.

Nowak's funeral took place at Brentwood Cathedral on 23 January 2026 and was attended by 650 people. The following month, a football match between the two university teams he had played for was held in his memory and raised over £40,000 for 2Wish, a charity supporting those affected by the sudden death of a child or young adult. On 27 June 2026, members of the Chafford Hundred Running Club organised a memorial run, with more than 200 people, including local MP Jen Craft, taking part.

== Criminal proceedings ==
=== Trial ===
Digwa went on trial on 14 May 2026 at Southampton Crown Court on charges of murder and carrying a knife in public. On 22 May, the judge, William Mousley KC, ordered him to face an alternative charge of manslaughter, to which he pleaded not guilty. Kaur was charged with assisting an offender by removing the weapon and also pleaded not guilty.

The prosecution, led by Nicholas Lobbenberg KC, told the jury that Nowak's blood alcohol level was below the drink-drive limit and that he had been filming a Snapchat video showing Digwa walking away from him before the stabbing. The footage was shown to the jury. Lobbenberg said that "the killing wasn't seen by anyone other than Henry and Vickrum Digwa" and that, after the stabbing, Digwa "chose to aggressively pursue" Nowak.

When asked why he had not told the police he stabbed Nowak, Digwa said he was scared because it was the "first time anything like this had ever happened". He alleged that Nowak had threatened him with racist remarks and begun recording him. He said that after being taunted he grabbed Nowak's phone and a fight broke out, during which Nowak said "I'm going to kill you". Digwa said he acted in self‑defence and testified that his parents arrived and took the knife home. Defence barristers told the jury they had to consider whether he acted "in the heat of the moment". A neighbour testified that he saw Digwa's mother try and stop officers from arresting him.

Digwa said in court that after his turban was knocked off, he had hair in his eyes as he stabbed Nowak. A bystander's video recorded between the stabbing and the arrival of the police showed his hair tied up, and loose when officers arrived. The prosecution said this showed a "dishonest claim of self defence taking root from the outset". Digwa told the court that he had been "respectful and polite" throughout his time in custody.

Digwa was carrying two ceremonial knives at the time of the murder: a small kirpan, required in Sikh religion, and the 21-centimetre (8.3 in) dagger used to stab Nowak. He chose to carry the larger dagger or kirpan (Note: The Sikh Federation has said the murder weapon should not be called a kirpan.) as a member of the Nihang order, though expert witness Professor Gurnam Singh said it is not a strict requirement. Both knives were carried under religious exemption to knife laws. In sentencing remarks, the judge said the "privilege extended to practising Sikhs of being allowed to be in public with a bladed article and, particularly in respect of the large dagger, a highly dangerous weapon, easily accessible to the wearer, brings with it huge responsibility".

On 27 May, the jury retired. On 28 May, it rejected the claims of self‑defence and found Digwa guilty of murder. He was also found guilty of carrying a knife in public, as the religious exemption was lost once it was used in an act of violence. Kaur was found guilty of assisting an offender. Sentencing was set for 1 June, with Kaur to be sentenced on 17 July.

It was later revealed that during the trial Hampshire Police had sought to release a statement addressing what it described as "disinformation" circulating online.

=== Perpetrator ===
Digwa, who was aged 23 when convicted of murder, is a British Sikh. The son of British-born Moga Singh and Indian-born Kiran Kaur, he was born and raised in Southampton. He was a member of the Nihang order, historically associated with martial practices and traditional weapons. With his older brother, Gurpreet Singh, he taught Gatka at the local gurdwara. In 2023, the brothers were reported to the police for stealing £1,000 worth of ceremonial knives from the gurdwara; they were arrested but released without charge.

A member of the local gurdwara described Digwa as argumentative and confrontational with "anger problems" and as a pathological liar. In January 2025, he was hired as a trainee at a local accountancy firm. A photograph from his workplace appears to show him wearing a ceremonial dagger in an external sheath. At trial, the prosecution said he had a weapons obsession, kept an "arsenal of weapons" in his bedroom and described the murder weapon "in loving terms". After the trial, footage emerged of Digwa in his garden with an air gun, filmed by a neighbour three years earlier.

=== Sentencing of Digwa and Kaur ===
During the sentencing of Digwa on 1 June, the judge said that Digwa's claim of being barged into by Nowak was a lie, but that Nowak "cheekily" called him a "bad man". The judge said: "You lied [to your brother] that you had been attacked, picking up on his question about whether it had been accompanied by racism by falsely claiming that Henry had called you a 'Paki'. I am sure that Henry had said nothing racist. You are the only person to make that claim and it is completely at odds with his previous character." The judge also said that during the confrontation, when Digwa grabbed Nowak's phone to prevent being filmed, it appeared that Digwa's turban "may have been knocked, pulled or, potentially, punched off" his head. The judge said that, as the turban is a sacred part of Sikh identity, it was understandable that Digwa may have perceived this as a sign of disrespect and that it would have increased his anger. He said Digwa had given a "convincing but wholly false narrative of the incident".

At sentencing, the judge cited an assessment of the pathologist, stating: "No emergency medical treatment would have permitted access to the bleeding vein. In simple terms, he would not have survived, however quickly he received first aid, CPR or expert medical treatment". The assessment indicated that the police delay in treating Nowak or calling an ambulance did not lead to his death.

Digwa received a life sentence for murder with a minimum term of 21 years. The judge had as a starting point a minimum term of 15 years, and added the following as aggravating factors: the number of stabs and nature of the weapon, the defendant's lies about Nowak, his filming Nowak's suffering, concealing evidence, putting the blame on Nowak, involving his mother in the crime, Nowak's vulnerability, community impact, and putting other Sikhs at risk of repercussions. This resulted in a sentence of 23 years, reduced to 21 years through taking into account the mitigating factors of Digwa's age and lack of previous convictions. For the crime of carrying a knife in public, he received a two-year sentence to run concurrently.

Digwa's mother, Kiran Kaur, was sentenced on 17 July 2026 to three years imprisonment for assisting an offender. She had removed the dagger from the crime scene.

=== Family statement ===
After the sentencing of Digwa, Nowak's father, Mark Nowak, read a statement outside Southampton Crown Court. He called Henry's treatment by police "inhumane and degrading" but expressed "heartfelt gratitude" to the murder investigation team. He added that the murderer had been "afforded decency". He also said that he did not want Henry's death to be used "to create further division, hatred, or tension" and quoted prosecutor Nicholas Lobbenberg as saying: "This is not a case about racism. This is a case about murder".

=== Appeal ===
Digwa applied for permission to appeal both his conviction and sentence; he was granted permission to appeal the sentence in September 2026. The Solicitor General, Ellie Reeves, referred Digwa's sentence to the Court of Appeal under the unduly lenient sentence scheme.

Both appeals against the sentence were heard by the Court of Appeal at the Royal Courts of Justice in London on 5 November 2026, before judges Baroness Carr, Matthew Nicklin and Mark Wall. Jonathan Polnay KC, the barrister for the Attorney General, argued that the sentence was too lenient because Digwa had abused the religious privilege which allowed him to carry a knife in public and used it against an "unarmed and defenceless stranger". The sentence, he said, failed to adequately reflect the aggravating features of the crime. Imran Khan KC, representing Digwa, argued that the sentence should not be increased since, he said, the original trial judge had not committed a "gross error" in sentencing. The Court of Appeal increased Digwa's sentence to 25 years.

=== Further charges ===
On 2 June, the day after the sentencing, Digwa appeared at Southampton Magistrates' Court to face charges of possessing offensive weapons (a flick knife, an extendable baton, knuckledusters, a machete, swords and kusaris) in a private place. His father, Moga Singh, and his brother, Gurpreet Digwa, faced similar charges. In addition, Gurpreet Digwa was charged with, on 4 December 2025, possessing offensive weapons (an extendable baton, an axe and a knife) in a public place, and furthermore of possessing a prohibited weapon (an air rifle). The three faced a total of 22 charges. The hearing was adjourned until July 2026. Moga Singh and Gurpreet Digwa appeared at Southampton Magistrates Court on 9 July; Digwa joined by videolink from HM Prison Frankland. All three pleaded not guilty to the charges against them and a trial date was set for September 2026 in the Magistrates Court.

== Inquest ==
At a brief hearing in Winchester on 4 June 2026, an inquest into Nowak's death was resumed and adjourned until September 2027, or earlier if the date could be brought forward. Hampshire coroner Jason Pegg said that, because Nowak had died in police custody, Article 2 of the European Convention on Human Rights was engaged. He said that the inquest, which would be held before a jury and with the participation of Nowak's family, would investigate "whether any act or omission by a police officer or any delay in the treatment Henry Nowak received caused or contributed to death".

== ITV documentary ==
On 5 November 2026, Tonight on ITV broadcast a documentary about Nowak's murder. Nowak's family told ITV that they felt "manipulated in [their] darkest hours" by the police force and the IOPC. They said they were told that police had immediately administered first aid to Nowak, and did not see the bodycam footage until the trial. They said the police initially described Nowak as the aggressor and asked them about Nowak's and their own political views.

== Reviews ==
=== IOPC review ===
After the death of Nowak, Hampshire and Isle of Wight Constabulary referred itself to the Independent Office for Police Conduct (IOPC), which opened a review into the events. The IOPC stated that the officers involved were being treated as witnesses. The IOPC was expected to report on the case within the following three months. On 1 July 2026, it was reported that the IOPC was investigating two of the officers – the first two to arrive on the scene – for potential gross misconduct.

=== HMICFRS review ===
On 2 June 2026, an enquiry by His Majesty's Inspectorate of Constabulary and Fire & Rescue Services (HMICFRS) was commissioned by Donna Jones, the Hampshire Police and Crime Commissioner.

=== Independent review ===
On 26 October 2026, Home Secretary Shabana Mahmood announced an independent review into the circumstances surrounding the murder, to be led by Alex Chalk, the former Lord Chancellor.

== Reactions and debates ==
=== Police statements ===
Following the conviction of Digwa, temporary Deputy Chief Constable Robert France of Hampshire Constabulary said: "The facts heard in court should leave no doubt in anyone's mind who was lying to officers that night, and why we didn't immediately understand what had happened."

On 2 June, Hampshire Police released bodycam footage showing the officers handcuffing and arresting Nowak as he lay dying. On 3 June, Chief Constable Alexis Boon, in a public interview with BBC News's Lucy Manning, apologised to Nowak's family. He said that one of the officers featured in the bodycam footage had left the force for an unrelated reason and the other three were no longer on front-line duties.

=== Politicians ===
On 11 December 2025, Jen Craft, Labour MP for the Thurrock constituency where Nowak grew up, paid tribute to him in the House of Commons and asked what the government was doing to support the victims of knife crime. She also visited Nowak's former school, Harris Academy Chafford Hundred, to pay her respects.

After sentencing on 1 June, Prime Minister Keir Starmer described the murder as an "awful, shocking case" and welcomed the IOPC investigation.

Following the release of the police bodycam footage, the case was debated in the House of Commons on 2 June 2026 and in the House of Lords on the following day. In the Commons, home secretary Shabana Mahmood described the bodycam footage as disturbing and tragic but said that people should wait for the IOPC investigation to provide answers about the actions of police officers. She acknowledged that there had been accusations of two-tier policing, again saying this would be addressed by the IOPC investigation. In the House of Lords, home office minister Lord Hanson of Flint described the footage as appalling and horrific and deferred further comment to the IOPC investigation.

After meeting with Nowak's family on 4 June, the leader of the opposition, Kemi Badenoch said she endorsed their view that trust in the police had been broken and needed to be rebuilt by work across political parties and religions. Having met with Nowak's family later on 4 June, Starmer said that there were "difficult questions that need to be answered about the way the police handled Henry's murder" and that Nowak "deserves a legacy that goes beyond this awful tragedy".

==== Accusations of two-tier policing ====
Shadow home secretary Chris Philp said in the House of Commons that the "police appeared more concerned with the accusation of racism than they were with helping Henry". Badenoch described the police treatment of Nowak as "absolutely appalling". She said she blamed "the training that police have been given, all of this nonsense that came in after the Black Lives Movement". She added: "I do not want police looking at the colour of your skin when they're deciding how to treat you. I think they are, because that's what they're being taught."

On 2 June, the leader of Reform UK, Nigel Farage, posted a video on social media in which he linked the case to "anti-White prejudice" and called for promoting "the idea that White lives matter just as much as black lives". He said: "Henry's family have responded to this in just the most extraordinarily dignified way. But I suggest the rest of us respond to this with pure, cold rage." The following day, during Prime Minister's Questions, Farage, with reference to police anti-racism guidance, asked Starmer to take action against what he said was "two-tier policing".

Robert Jenrick of Reform UK raised the actions of the police in the House of Commons during the trial on 21 May. He called the police conduct a scandal, asked what the Home Secretary was doing to investigate it, and requested a debate on what he described as "two-tier policing". He later said that Reform UK would seek to ban ceremonial knives from being carried in public.

US-based businessman Elon Musk called the police officers involved "disgusting" and demanded they be fired. He also offered to fund a wrongful death lawsuit and a private prosecution against them. In a post on X about the killing, the US State Department wrote that "ideological conditioning and two-tiered policing are glaring symptoms of civilizational decline." On 5 June, the US vice-president, JD Vance, blamed Nowak's death on "the politics of self-hatred and the mass invasion of immigrants". Deputy Prime Minister David Lammy responded by calling Vance and telling him he was wrong.

Following criticism of the National Police Chiefs' Council (NPCC's) anti-racism document that states: "(Racial equality) does not mean treating everyone 'the same' or being 'colour blind'", the NPCC announced that it plans to review the guidance.

=== Sikh community ===
The Sikh Federation wrote to home secretary Shabana Mahmood after reporting an increase in anti-Sikh hate crimes following the trial, asking for strengthened legislation. In a further letter, the Federation called for a public inquiry into Nowak's murder. A group of eleven Sikh MPs issued a statement in which they said that the murder was not about Sikhism.

Sikhs from the local gurdwara at Grays held a meeting with Nowak's mother to offer their "deepest sympathies, support and solidarity". They had known Nowak as he had worked at a supermarket close to the gurdwara.

=== Protest ===
A protest took place in Southampton on the evening of 2 June 2026, the day after the sentencing of Digwa. Activist Tommy Robinson addressed a crowd outside Southampton central police station at a "Justice for Henry Nowak" protest. Other people present at the protest included Britain First leader Paul Golding, UK Independence Party leader Nick Tenconi, the activist Thomas Moffitt (known as Young Bob) and Laurence Fox. Current and former members of Raise the Colours were also present. Two people were arrested, and Hampshire Police reported that 11 officers and a police dog were injured during the disorder. By early August 2026, 34 people had been charged in connection with the disorder. Jail sentences of up to three years and three months were handed down to those convicted of violence during the protest.

=== Misidentification of police officers ===
The identities of the police officers involved in the incident were not disclosed. The Daily Echo reported on 29 May that a "PC Parsons" was the officer who "initially handcuffed Henry while he was critically injured." On 4 June it was reported that Christi Hill, a former police officer who had been falsely accused online of being involved in the Nowak arrest, had been forced to move to a safe house. Home Secretary Shabana Mahmood said on 2 June that another officer, also misidentified online, had also been forced to move out of his home. Police officer Tristan Parsons, who BBC News said was also misidentified, was in the United States at the time of the murder. Both were misidentified by Grok, the AI chatbot, amongst others.

=== Debate over carrying knives in public ===
After Digwa's sentencing, Nowak's father, Mark, urged the government to treat knife crime as a national emergency and called for stronger controls on the sale, ownership and carrying of knives. Elders at Southampton Gurdwara had previously expressed concern about Digwa's habit of carrying swords in public while dressed in Nihang Sikh attire.

Under UK knife laws, it is an offence to carry a bladed weapon in public. Section 139 of the Criminal Justice Act 1988 provides for certain exemptions, including religious reasons. The Offensive Weapons Act 2019 confirmed the right of Sikhs to carry a small kirpan. Digwa carried both the small concealed kirpan required by his faith and a larger sheathed dagger associated with the Nihang Sikh tradition. In his sentencing remarks, the judge said it was possible that Digwa had a “good legal reason” for carrying the larger dagger when he encountered Nowak, but that this justification ended when he drew it from its sheath and used it in the attack.

During the trial, the weapon was repeatedly described as a kirpan by the prosecution, defence and judge, a characterisation disputed by Sikh organisations. Digwa also referred to it as a kirpan when giving evidence. In sentencing remarks, the judge described it as a large dagger worn by Digwa in addition to the small kirpan.

The Southampton Sikh Federation and the Network of Sikh Federations stated that the murder weapon was a pesh-kabz rather than a kirpan, and the Sikh Federation said it "was not the normal Kirpan worn by fully practising Sikhs". The Supreme Sikh Council announced a review of safeguards around carrying ceremonial knives and a strengthened educational campaign on Sikh responsibilities.

On 3 June, Hampshire Police and crime commissioner Donna Jones supported calls for a review of knife laws, urging the government to examine the current maximum permitted blade length of nine inches (23 cm).
