= Norman Fairclough =

British linguist

- Born: 3 April 1941 (age 85); Lancaster, United Kingdom

Academic background
- Education: University College, London (BA, MA); Lancaster University (PhD)

Academic work
- Discipline: Linguist
- Sub-discipline: Critical discourse analysis
- Institutions: Lancaster University

Norman Fairclough (/ˈfɛərklʌf/; born 3 April 1941) is an emeritus professor of linguistics at Lancaster University. He is one of the founders of critical discourse analysis (CDA) as applied to sociolinguistics.

== Critical discourse analysis ==
Critical discourse analysis, also called textually oriented discourse analysis or TODA to distinguish it from philosophical enquiries not involving linguistic methodology, is concerned with the mutual effects of linguistic textual properties, sociolinguistic speech genres, and sociological practices. The main thrust of Fairclough's analysis is that, if according to Foucauldian theory practices are discursively shaped and enacted, the intrinsic properties of discourse, which are linguistically analysable, constitute a key element of their interpretation. He is thus interested in how social practices are discursively shaped, as well as the subsequent discursive effects of social practices.

Language and Power (1989) explored the overlaps between language and socio-political institutional practices. In the book Fairclough develops the concept of synthetic personalisation to account for the linguistic effects providing an appearance of direct concern and contact with the individual listener in mass-crafted discourse phenomena, such as advertising, marketing, and political or media discourse. This is seen as part of a larger-scale process of technologisation of discourse, which encompasses the increasingly subtle technical developments in the field of communication that aim to bring under scientifically regulated practice semiotic fields that were formerly considered suprasegmental, such as patterns of intonation, the graphic layout of text on the page, or proxemic data.

His book New Labour, New Language? (2000) looks at the rhetoric used by the Labour Party in the United Kingdom, with a particular focus on the party's developments towards New Labour.

== Influences ==
Fairclough's theories have been influenced by Mikhail Bakhtin and Michael Halliday in linguistics, and by ideology theorists such as Antonio Gramsci, Louis Althusser, Michel Foucault, and Pierre Bourdieu in sociology.

== Honorary degrees ==
- Dr.phil.h.c., Aalborg University, 2004
- Honorary Doctorate, University of Jyväskylä, 1998

== Publications ==
=== Books ===
==== As author ====
- Language and Power. London: Longman. 1989.
- Discourse and Social Change. Cambridge: Polity. 1992.
- Media Discourse. London: Edward Arnold. 1995.
- Critical Discourse Analysis. Boston: Addison-Wesley. 1995
- Discourse in Late Modernity: Rethinking Critical Discourse Analysis. With Lilie Chouliaraki. Edinburgh University Press. 1999.
- New Labour, New Language? London: Routledge. 2000
- Analysing Discourse: Textual Analysis for Social Research. London: Routledge. 2003.
- Language and Globalization. London: Routledge. 2006.
- Discourse and Contemporary Social Change. Edited with Guiseppina Cortese and Patrizia Ardizzone. Bern: Peter Lang. 2007.
- Political Discourse Analysis: A Method for Advanced Students. With Isabela Fairclough. London: Routledge. 2013.

==== As editor ====
- Critical Language Awareness. London: Longman. 1992.

=== Selected journal articles ===
- "Critical and descriptive goals in discourse analysis". Journal of Pragmatics. 9 (6). December 1985. doi:10.1016/0378-2166(85)90002-5.
- "Discourse and Text: Linguistic and Intertextual Analysis within Discourse Analysis". Discourse & Society. 3 (2). April 1992. doi:10.1177/0957926592003002004.
- "Critical Discourse Analysis and the Marketization of Public Discourse: The Universities". Discourse & Society. 4 (2). April 1993. doi:10.1177/0957926593004002002.
- "A reply to Henry Widdowson's 'Discourse analysis: a critical view'". Language and Literature: International Journal of Stylistics. 5 (1). February 1996. doi:10.1177/096394709600500105.
- "Rhetoric and Critical Discourse Analysis: A Reply to Titus Ensink and Christoph Sauer". Current Issues In Language and Society. 3 (3). 1996. doi:10.1080/13520529609615475.
- "Global Capitalism and Critical Awareness of Language". Language Awareness. 8 (2). April 1999. doi:10.1080/09658419908667119.
- "Responses to Carter and Sealey: Realism and sociolinguistics". Journal of Sociolinguistics. 4 (1). With Jonathan Potter. February 2000. doi:10.1111/1467-9481.00101.
- "Discourse, social theory, and social research: The discourse of welfare reform". Journal of Sociolinguistics. 4 (2). May 2000. doi:10.1111/1467-9481.00110.
- "The dialectics of discourse". Textus. 14 (2). 2001.
- "Language in New Capitalism". Discourse & Society. 13 (2). March 2002. doi:10.1177/0957926502013002404.
- "`Political Correctness': the Politics of Culture and Language". Discourse & Society. 14 (1). January 2003. doi:10.1177/0957926503014001927.
- "Book Review: ALASTAIR PENNYCOOK, Critical Applied Linguistics: A Critical Introduction. London: Erlbaum, 2001. 240 pp. ISBN 0–805–83792–2". Discourse & Society. 14 (6). November 2003. doi:10.1177/09579265030146008.
- "Introduction". Critical Discourse Studies. 1 (1). With Phil Graham, Jay Lemke, and Ruth Wodak. April 2004. doi:10.1080/17405900410001674489.
- "Peripheral Vision: Discourse Analysis in Organization Studies: The Case for Critical Realism". Organization Studies. 26 (6). June 2005. doi:10.1177/0170840605054610.

=== Selected book chapters ===
- "The Appropriacy of 'Appropriateness'". In Fairclough, Norman (ed.). Critical Language Awareness. London: Routledge. 1992.
- "Discourse and Cultural Change in the Enterprise Culture". In Graddol, David; Thompson, Linda; Byram, Michael (eds.). Language and Culture. Clevedon: Multilingual Matters. 1993.
- "Technologisation of Discourse". In Caldas-Coulthard, Carmen Rosa; Coulthard, Malcolm (eds.). Texts and Practices: Readings in Critical Discourse Analysis. London: Routledge. 1996.
- "The Conversationalisation of Political Discourse: A Comparative View". With Anna Mauranen. In Blommaert, Jan; Bulcaen, Chris (eds.). Political Linguistics. Amsterdam: John Benjamins. 1998.
- "Democracy and the Public Sphere in Critical Research on Discourse". In Wodak, Ruth; Ludwig, Christoph (eds.). Challenges in a Changing World: Issues in Critical Discourse Analysis. Vienna: Passagen Verlag. 1999.
- "Critical Discourse Analysis". In McHoul, Alec; Rapley, Mark (eds.). How to Analyse Talk in Institutional Settings: A Casebook of Methods. London: Continuum. 2001.
- "Critical Discourse Analysis as a Method in Social Scientific Research". In Wodak, Ruth; Meyer, Michael (eds.). Methods of Critical Discourse Analysis. London: Sage. 2001.
- "The Discourse of New Labour: Critical Discourse Analysis". In Wetherell, Margaret; Taylor, Stephanie; Yates, Simeon (eds.). Discourse as Data: A Guide for Analysis. London: Sage. 2001.
