= Synthetic personalisation =

Addressing mass audience as individuals

Synthetic personalisation is the process of addressing mass audiences as though they were individuals through inclusive language usage. This concept emerged from critical discourse analysis (CDA), a branch of sociolinguistics concentrating upon how power is articulated.

Norman Fairclough, credited with developing the concept, calls it "a compensatory tendency to give the impression of treating each of the people 'handled' en masse as an individual." Through synthetic personalisation, convergence can be achieved, where distance between audience and speakers are brought closer together. As a result, this builds an intimate relationship between the speaker, writer and the audiences, creating a sense of private engagement and resonance.

Nevertheless, it is important to take into account that synthetic personalisation builds on a foundation of an "unequal encounter", in which the producer of text or speech have sole control over a one-sided endorsement. Hence, synthetic personalisation often appears to be neutral, yet, ideological powers are hidden behind.

== Application ==
=== Mass Media ===
Frequently utilised in advertising world and media, synthetic personalisation is an effective strategy used by the mass media to win consumers' hearts and simulate friendships between consumers and producers.

=== Political Discourse ===
Due to its efficiency in addressing indeterminable audiences, the use of synthetic personalisation is also prevalent in political settings. In recent years, the use of synthetic personalisation in politicians' speech has been analysed. Relevant research includes Wong's study on Barack Obama's speech at the 2008 US Democratic National Convention, and Corina's study on Vladimir Putin's speech regarding Russian annexation of Crimea. Nonetheless, research is limited and tentative.

=== E-mail and Direct Marketing ===
E-mail campaigns routinely utilises synthetic personalization by inserting recipients' names and tailoring subject lines (e.g. "John, your exclusive offer awaits!") as a strategy to boost engagement. This strategy has been shown to increase open rates by up to 20% and sales lead by 31%, thereby enhancing customer engagement and response to marketing campaigns."

=== Chatbots and AI ===
In conversational commerce, AI-based chatbots use synthetic personalisation through anthropomorphic language and second-person pronouns, which increases users' perception that products are personalized to them, thereby enhancing their incentive to purchase, as they perceive the products are more relevant to them. This significantly increases users' perception of personalisation of the products and their willingness to pay compared to neutral chatbot interactions.

== Method ==
=== Use of First and Second Person Pronouns ===
The use of second person pronouns, like you and we, contributes significantly to the process of synthetic personalisation within the mass media. Addressing readers or listeners with inclusive pronouns like we, our and us creates personal engagement with readers. The respective usage also triggers audiences' participation as they are "involved" in the utterance, which brings up their point of view and sympathy. Meanwhile, the second-person pronoun - you, is used to create a sense as of face-to-face individual conversations. An example that illustrates this is "List down 'the various things you've always wanted to do but couldn't because of your work schedule'. Now go do them!" ('You're Fired, Now What?' Her World, December 2012)

=== Use of Possessive Pronouns ===
Distance between the audience and speaker can be reduced by using possessive pronouns. They are commonly used while the producers are mentioning and telling stories about people who are closely related to them, such as family, friends and relatives. This brings a sense of closeness and engage to the audience. In particular, it was found that women's speeches in mass media tend to include more possessive pronouns when compared to men's.

=== Response Demanding Utterances ===
Synthetic personalisation is also constructed through the impression of a two-way interaction. This is achieved by response-demanding utterances, including commands and questions. This simulation of reciprocal discourse gives a sense of intimacy and creates the idea of the publication "as friend, giving advice or solution to common problems".

== Related Terminology ==
=== Synthetic Sisterhood ===
Mary Talbot used the concept in her work on a synthetic sisterhood in teenage girls' magazines, analysing the linguistic devices (pronouns, presuppositions) constructing a simulated friendship between reader and producer. Using a variety of sociolinguistic concepts, including positive politeness, she comments upon the ideological implications, such as patriarchy.

=== Direct Address ===
The use of second person pronouns, like "you" and "we", to address mass audiences as individuals used by synthetic personalization is usually referred to as "Direct Address" (Kennedy, W.J., 1987).

=== Inclusive Language ===
The use of first person pronouns (e.g. we, us, our) to construct a sense of community and shared identity between sender and mass audience.

=== Audience Positioning ===
The rhetorical strategy of assigning an implied social role or stance to the audience (e.g., as "valued customer," "citizen," or "friend"). For example, marketing emails position recipients as "valued customer," reinforcing a transactional relationship and boosting responsiveness, while teenage magazines address readers as "girlfriend," simulating an intimate peer relationship within mass‐produced media.
