= Visual communication =

Method of communication

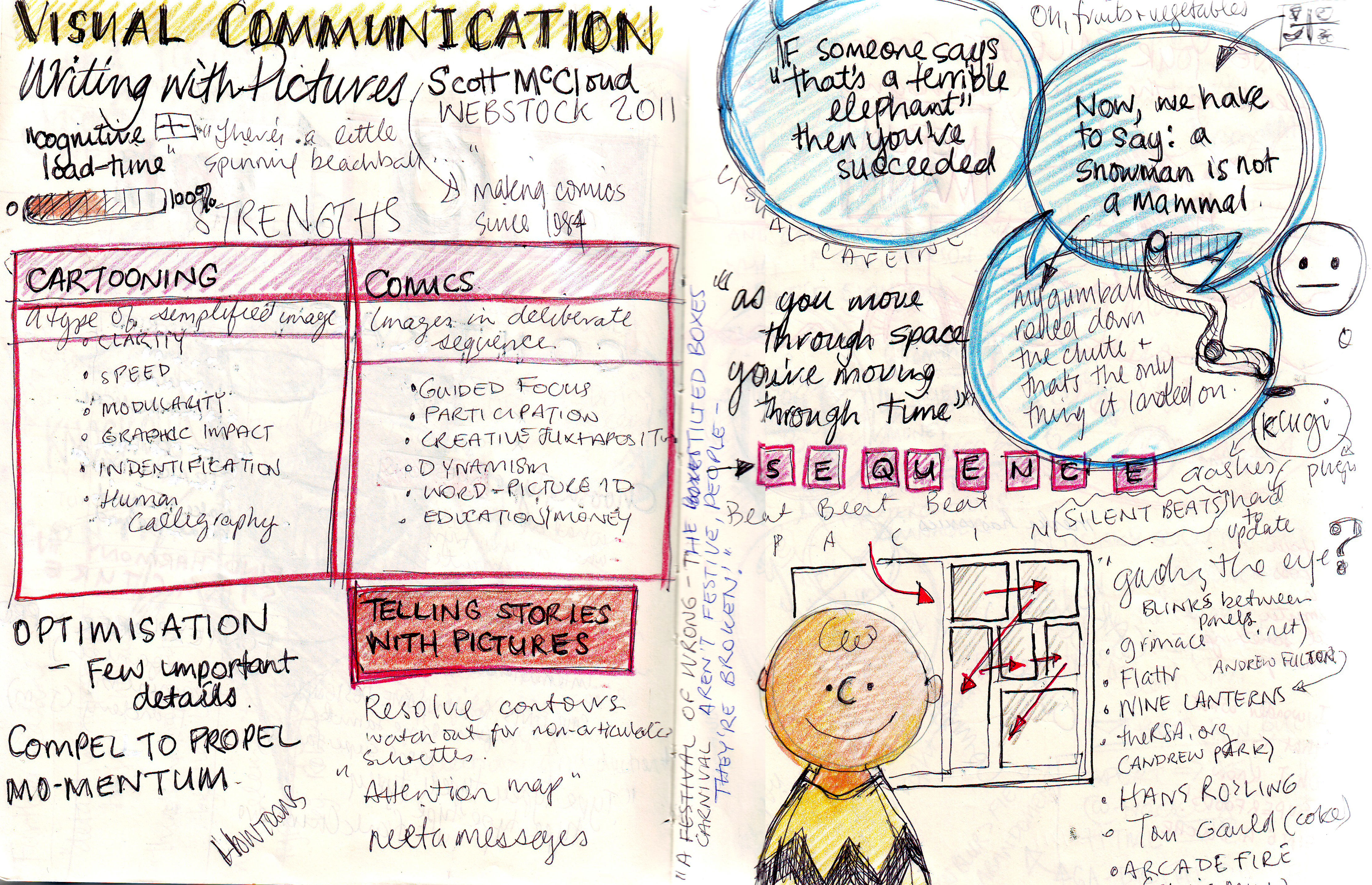
This Image is showing the visual communication process.

Visual communication is the use of visual elements to convey ideas and information which include (but are not limited to) signs, typography, drawing, graphic design, illustration, industrial design, advertising, animation, and electronic resources.

This style of communication relies on the way one's brain perceives outside images. These images come together within the human brain making it as if the brain is what is actually viewing the particular image. Visual communication has been proven to be unique when compared to other verbal or written languages because of its more abstract structure. It stands out for its uniqueness, as the interpretation of signs varies on the viewer's field of experience. The brain then tries to find meaning from the interpretation. The interpretation of imagery is often compared to the set alphabets and words used in oral or written languages. Another point of difference found by scholars is that, though written or verbal languages are taught, sight does not have to be learned and therefore people of sight may lack awareness of visual communication and its influence in their everyday life. Many of the visual elements listed above are forms of visual communication that humans have been using since prehistoric times. Within modern culture, there are several types of characteristics when it comes to visual elements, they consist of objects, models, graphs, diagrams, maps, and photographs. Outside the different types of characteristics and elements, there are seven components of visual communication: color, shape, tones, texture, figure-ground, balance, and hierarchy.

Each of these characteristics, elements, and components play an important role in daily lives. Visual communication holds a specific purpose in aspects such as social media, culture, politics, economics, and science. In considering these different aspects, visual elements present various uses and how they convey information. Whether it is advertisements, teaching and learning, or speeches and presentations, they all involve visual aids that communicate a message. In reference to the visual aids, the following are the most common: chalkboard or whiteboard, poster board, handouts, video excerpts, projection equipment, and computer-assisted presentations.

== Overview ==
The debate about the nature of visual communication dates back thousands of years. Visual communication relies on a collection of activities, communicating ideas, attitudes, and values via visual resources, i.e. text, graphics, or video. The evaluation of a good visual communication design is mainly based on measuring comprehension by the audience, not on personal aesthetic and/or artistic preference as there are no universally agreed-upon principles of aesthetics. Visual communication by e-mail, a textual medium, is commonly expressed with ASCII art, emoticons, and embedded digital images. Visual communication has become one of the most important approaches using which people communicate and share information.

The term 'visual presentation' is used to refer to the actual presentation of information through a visible medium such as text or images. Recent research in the field has focused on web design and graphically-oriented usability.

=== Important figures ===
Aldous Huxley is regarded as one of the most prominent explorers of visual communication and sight-related theories. Becoming near-blind in his teen years as the result of an illness influenced his approach, and his work includes important novels on the dehumanizing aspects of scientific progress, most famously Brave New World and The Art of Seeing. He described "seeing" as being the sum of sensing, selecting, and perceiving. One of his most famous quotes is "The more you see, the more you know."

Max Wertheimer is said to be the father of Gestalt psychology. Gestalt means form or shape in German, and the study of Gestalt psychology show emphasis in simplicity, as its properties group visuals by similarity in shape or color, continuity, and proximity. Additional laws include closure and figure-ground principles in studied images is also intensively taught.

Kurt Koffka and Wolfgang Köhler are also prominent figures in early visual communication research.

=== Image analysis ===
Visual communication contains image aspects. The interpretation of images is subjective and to understand the depth of meaning, or multiple meanings, communicated in an image requires image analysis. Images can be analyzed through many perspectives, for example these six major perspectives presented by Paul Martin Lester: Personal, Historical, Technical, Ethical, Cultural, and Critical.

- Personal perspective: When a viewer has an opinion about an image based on their personal thoughts. Personal response depends on the viewer's thoughts and values, individually. However, this might sometimes conflict with cultural values. Also when a viewer has viewed an image with a personal perspective, it is hard to change the view of the image on the viewer, even though the image can be seen in other ways.
- Historical perspective: An image's view can be arising from the history of the use of media. Through times sort images have been changed, because the use of different (new) media. For example: The result of using the computer to edit images (e.g. Photoshop) is quite different when comparing images that are made and edited by craft.
- Technical perspective: When the view of an image is influenced by the use of lights, position and the presentation of the image. The right use of light, position and presentation of the image can improve the view of the image. It makes the image looks better than the reality.
- Ethical perspective: From this perspective, the maker of the image, the viewer and the image itself must be responsible morally and ethically to the image. This perspective is also categorized in six categories: categorical imperative, utilitarianism, hedonism, golden mean, golden rule, and veil of ignorance.
- Cultural perspective: Symbolization is an important definition for this perspective. Cultural perspective involves identity of symbols. The uses of words that are related with the image, the use of heroes in the image, etc. are the symbolization of the image. The cultural perspective can also be seen as the semiotic perspective.
- Critical perspective: The view of images in the critical perspective is when the viewers criticize the images, but the critics have been made in interests of the society, although an individual makes the critics. This way this perspective differs from the personal perspective.

=== Visual aid media: Simple to advanced ===
- Chalkboard or whiteboard: Chalkboards and whiteboards are very useful visual aids, particularly when more advanced types of media are available. They are cheap and also allow for much flexibility. The use of chalkboards or whiteboards is convenient, but they are not a perfect visual aid. Often, using this medium as an aid can create confusion or boredom. Particularly if a student who is not familiar with how to properly use visual aids attempts to draw on a board while they are speaking, they detract time and attention from their actual speech.
- Poster board: A poster is a very simple and easy visual aid. Posters can display charts, graphs, pictures, or illustrations. The biggest drawback of using a poster as a visual aid is that often a poster can appear unprofessional. Since a poster board paper is relatively flimsy, often the paper will bend or fall over. The best way to present a poster is to hang it up or tape it to a wall.
- Handouts: Handouts can also display charts, graphs, pictures, or illustrations. An important aspect of the use of a handout is that a person can keep a handout with them long after the presentation is over. This can help the person better remember what was discussed. Passing out handouts, however, can be extremely distracting. Once a handout is given out, it might potentially be difficult to bring back your audience's attention. The person who receives the handout might be tempted to read what is on the paper, which will keep them from listening to what the speaker is saying. If using a handout, the speaker distributes the hand out right before you reference it. Distributing handouts is acceptable in a lecture that is an hour or two, but in a short lecture of five to ten minutes, a handout should not be used.
- Video excerpts: A video can be a great visual aid and attention grabber, however, a video is not a replacement for an actual speech. There are several potential drawbacks to playing a video during a speech or lecture. First, if a video is playing that includes audio, the speaker will not be able to talk. Also, if the video is very exciting and interesting, it can make what the speaker is saying appear boring and uninteresting. The key to showing a video during a presentation is to make sure to transition smoothly into the video and to only show very short clips.
- Projection equipment: There are several types of projectors. These include slide projectors, overhead projectors, and computer projectors. Slide projectors are the oldest form of projector, and are no longer used. Overhead projectors are still used but are somewhat inconvenient to use. In order to use an overhead projector, a transparency must be made of whatever is being projected onto the screen. This takes time and costs money. Computer projectors are the most technologically advanced projectors. When using a computer projector, pictures and slides are easily taken right from a computer either online or from a saved file and are blown up and shown on a large screen. Though computer projectors are technologically advanced, they are not always completely reliable because technological breakdowns are not uncommon of the computers of today.
- Computer-assisted presentations: Presentations through presentation software can be an extremely useful visual aid, especially for longer presentations. For five- to ten-minute presentations, it is probably not worth the time or effort to put together a deck of slides. For longer presentations, however, they can be a great way to keep the audience engaged and keep the speaker on track. A potential drawback of using them is that it usually takes a lot of time and energy to put together. There is also the possibility of a computer malfunction, which can mess up the flow of a presentation.

== Visual literacy ==
Studies often define visual literacy (or visual competence) as the ability to understand and process what is being seen in order to make sense of the world. Being visually literate has been shown to be an important aspect of life to those with sight. The function of sight itself has mechanisms that must work together in order to transform the lines, shapes, and colors around a person's environment into a cohesive picture that can then hold meaning. These mechanisms are what occur in the human body that allow a person's eye to make sense of what the viewer sees and then the signals that are sent to relay information to their brain to be processed. However, studies conducted state that visual intelligence is not something that is taught but rather observed. It is also noted within this study that this skill often goes unnoticed until it is impaired. This act of processing what is being seen has been shown to happen quickly and oftentimes without the viewer's cognizant awareness.

The effect visual literacy has on a viewer has also been shown to influence aspects of their life such as, attitudes, values, beliefs, as well as cultural views. Scholars have noted how society and culture is often dominated by imagery, especially with the rise of mass technological media. The dominance of visuals in culture such as film, television and social media, have now been used by various companies for their advertisements. Presidential and political candidates have also turned to the media to visually promote their campaigns. With many of these advertisements present in everyday life, the viewers of this content may often be open to influence without being cognizant of it.

== Study of symbols ==
=== Semiotics ===
Semiotics is the study of signs and visuals within society that relay meaning. The symbols used in different cultures to convey a meaning also entails the hidden systems and functions that make up the symbols. Logos, gestures, and technological signs such as emoticons, are a few examples of symbols used in culture.

The term semiology is the study of signs and symbols and their arrangements as a visual language. The characterization of what is considered a language is the existence of an alphabet that can be arranged to create meaning. An example of signs, or an alphabet, that can be arranged to create meaning are the 26 letters that make up the Modern English Alphabet which can then be used to compose written messages that can then be relayed orally. However, in semiology, the signs that create the alphabet of visual communication are more abstract than a written or verbal languages alphabet. In comparison to the English Alphabet, the visual alphabet is still being studied due to the various channels that may be used to relay visuals. Components of a still graphic compared to film, for instance. Another category of study within the field of semiotics is how the interpretation of visual signs depends on the experiences of the person interpreting the visual components of symbols, commonly referred to as the interpretant.

=== Theory of semiotics ===
Collectively, the study of visual imagery and gestures as a language has two major schools of thought. The contributors who are commonly referred to are; Charles Sanders Peirce and his descendants and Ferdinand de Saussure. Peirce's school of thought is the meaning that the interpreter assigns to a particular sign instead of the study of the sign itself. His work focuses on the pragmatics, semantics, and structure of a symbol in visual communication. Saussure, however, focused primarily on the structure and value of a sign and its relation to other symbols within the language system. The school of thought that Saussure curated contributed to the rise of structuralism as well as later theories developed by various scholars in the field of communication.

== Prominence and motive ==
=== Social media ===
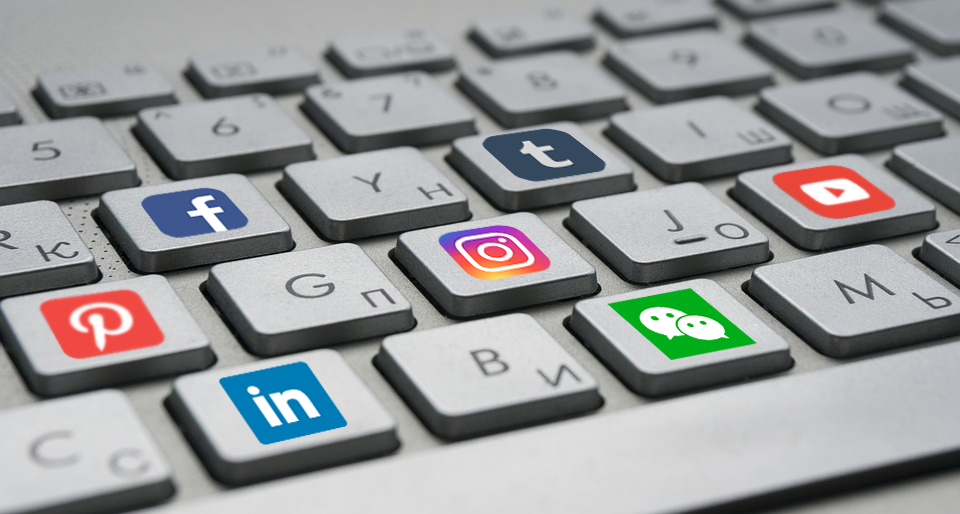
Major Social Media Apps

Social media is one of the most effective ways to communicate. The incorporation of text and images deliver messages quicker and more simplistic through social media platforms. A potential drawback can be there is limited access due to the internet access requirement and certain limitations to the number of characters and image size. Despite the potential drawback, there has been a shift towards more visual images with the rise of YouTube, Instagram, and Snapchat. In the rise of these platforms, Facebook and Twitter, have followed suit and integrated more visual images into their platform outside the use of written posts. It can be stated that visual images are used in two ways: as additional clarification for spoken or written text, or to create individual meaning (usually incorporating ambiguous meanings). These meanings can assist in creating casual friendships through interactions and either show or fabricate reality. These major platforms are becoming focused on visual images by growing a multi-modal platform with users having the ability to edit or adjust their pictures or videos these platforms. When analyzing the relationship between visual communication and social media, four themes arise:

- Emerging genres and practices: The sharing of various visual elements allow for the creation of genres, or new arrangements of socially accepted visual elements (i.e. photographs or GIFs) based on the platforms. These emerging genres are used as self-expression of identity, to feel a sense of belonging of different sub-group of the online community.
- Identity construction: Similar to genres, users will use visuals through social media to express their identities. Visual elements can change in meaning over a period of time by the person who shared it, which means that visual elements can be dynamic. This makes visuals uncontrollable since the person may not identify as that specific identity, but rather someone who has evolved.
- Everyday public/private vernacular practices: This theme presents the difficulty of deciphering what is considered public, or private. Users can post the privacy from their own home, however, their post is interacting with users from the online public.
- Transmedia circulation, appropriation, and control: Transmedia circulation refers to visual elements being circulated through different types of media. Visual elements, such as images can be taken from one platform, edited, and posted to another platform without recognizing where it originally came from. The concept of appropriation and ownership can be brought into question, making aware the idea that if a user can appropriate another person work, then that user's work can appropriated, as well.

=== Culture ===
Members of different cultures can participate in the exchange of visual imagery based on the idea of universal understandings. The term visual culture allows for all cultures to feel equal, making it the inclusive aspect of every life. When considering visual culture in communication, it is shaped by the values amongst all cultures, especially regarding the concepts of high and low-context. Cultures that are generally more high-context will rely heavily on visual elements that have an implied and implicit meaning. However, cultures that are low-context will rely on visual elements that have a direct meaning and rely more on the textual explanations. Visual communication can be defined in different ways (Volli 1994). An effective one is through opposition with signification (Volli 2010). Whereas visual signification can be unintentional, there is no communication without intentionality. A sunset signifies something, whereas a painting signifies something but also communicates, because culture marks it as product of communicative intentionality. However, imputation of intentionality changes across cultures and epochs. Whereas religion may see a sunset as a divine message, secular observers will attach to it an unintentional meaning of nostalgia.

=== Politics ===
Visual communication in politics have become a primary sense of communication, while dialogue and text have become a secondary sense. This may be due to the increased use of televisions, as viewers become more dependent on visuals. Sound bite has become a popular and perfected art among all political figures. Despite it being a favored mode of showcasing a political figure's agenda, it has shown that 25.1% of news coverage displayed image bites - instead of voices, there are images and short videos. Visuals are deemed an essential function in political communication, and behind these visuals are 10 functions for why political figures use them. These functions include:

- Argument function: Although images do not indicate any words being said, this function conveys the idea that images can have an association between objects or ideas. Visuals in politics can make arguments about the different aspects of a political figure's character or intentions. When introducing visual imagery with sound, the targeted audience can clarify ambiguous messages that a political figure has said in interviews or news stories.
- Agenda setting function: Under this function, it is important that political figures produce newsworthy pictures that will allow for their message to gain coverage. The reason for this is due to the agenda-setting theory, where importance of public agenda is taken into consideration when the media determines the importance of a certain story or issue. With that said, if politicians do not provide an interesting and attention-grabbing picture, there will likely be no news coverage. A way for a politician to gain news coverage, is to provide exclusivity for what the media can capture from a certain event. Despite not having the ability to control whether they receive coverage, they can control if the media gets an interesting and eye-catching visual.
- Dramatization function: Similar to agenda setting, the dramatization function targets a specific policy that a political figure wants to advocate for. This function can be seen when Michelle Obama promoted nutrition by hosting a media event of her planting a vegetable garden, or Martin Luther King Jr. producing visuals from his 1963 campaign for racial injustice. In some cases, these images are used as icons for social movements.
- Emotional function: Visuals can be used as a way to provoke an emotional response. A study that was performed found that motion pictures and video has more of an emotional impact than still images. On the other hand, research has suggested that the logic and rationality of a viewer is not barred by emotion. In fact, logic and emotion are interrelated meaning that images not only can have emotional arousal, but also influence viewers to think logically.
- Image-building function: Imagery gives a viewer a first impression of a candidate when they are running for office. These visuals give voters a sense of who they will be voting for during the elections, regarding their background, personality, or demeanor. They can create their image by appearing be family-oriented, religiously involved, or showing a commonality with the disadvantaged community.
- Identification function: Through the identification function, visuals can create an identification between political figures and audiences. In other words, the audience may perceive a type of similarity with the political figure. When a voter finds a similarity with a candidate they are more likely to vote for them. This is the same when a voter notices a candidate who does not have any perceived similarities, then they are less likely to vote for them.
- Documentation function: Similar to a stamp on a passport that indicated you have been to a certain country, photographs of a political figure can document that an event had happened and they were there. By documenting an event that occurred, there is evidence and proof for argumentative claims. If a political figure claims one thing, then there is evidence to either back it up or disprove it.
- Societal symbol function: This function is used in visuals when political figures use iconic symbols to draw on emotional power. For instance, political figures will stand with American flags, be photographed with military personnel, or even attending a sport. These three areas of societal symbols hold a strong sense of patriotism. In comparison, congressional candidates may be pictured with former or current presidents to gain an implied endorsement. Many places like the Statue of Liberty, Mount Rushmore, or the Tomb of the Unknown Soldier can be seen and iconic, societal symbols that hold a sense of emotional power.
- Transportation function: The transportation function of using visuals is to transporter the viewer to a different time or place. Visuals can figuratively bring viewers to the past or to an idealized future. Political figures will use this tactic as a way to appeal to the emotional side of their audience and get them to visually relate to the argument that is at hand.
- Ambiguity function: Visuals can be used to interpret different meanings without having to add any words. By not adding any words, visuals are normally used for controversial arguments. On the basis that visual claims can be controversial, they are held to a less strict standard compared to other symbols.

=== Economic ===
Economics has been built on the foundation of visual elements, such as graphs and charts. Similar to the other aspects of why visual elements are used, graphs are used by economists to clarify complex ideas. Graphs simplify the process of visualizing trends that happen over time. Along the same lines, graphs are able to assist in determining a relationship between two or more variables. The relationship can determine if there is a positive correlation or negative correlation between the variables. A graph that economists rely heavily on is a time-series graph, which measures a particular variable over a period of time. The graph includes time being on the X-axis, while a changing variable is on the Y-axis.

=== Science and medicine ===
Science and medicine has shown a need for visual communication to assist in explaining to non-scientific readers. From Bohr's atomic model to NASA's photographs of Earth, these visual elements have served as tools in furthering the understand of science and medicine. More specifically, elements like graphs and slides portray both data and scientific concepts. Patterns that are revealed by those graphs are then used in association with the data to determine a meaningful correlation. As for photographs, they can be useful for physicians to rely on in figuring out visible signs of diseases and illnesses.

However, using visual elements can have a negative effect on the understanding of information. Two major obstacles for non-scientific readers is: 1.) the lack of integration of visual elements in every day scientific language, and 2.) incorrectly identifying the targeted audience and not adjusting to their level of understanding. To tackle these obstacles, one solution is for science communicators must place the user at the center of the design, which is called User-Centered Design. This design focuses on strictly the user and how they can interact with the visual element with minimum stress, but maximum level of efficiency. Another solution could be implemented at the source, which is university-based programs. In these programs, universities need to introduce visual literacy to those in science communication, helping in producing graduates who can accurately interpret, analyze, evaluate, and design visual elements that further the understanding of science and medicine.

== See also ==
- Advertising
- Art director
- Cartography
- Graphic design
- Illustration
- Models of communication
- Optical communication
- Photography
- Swiss Style (design)
- Sign industry
- Technical geography
- Telepresence
- Typography
- Videoconference
- Visual Communication (journal)
- Visual culture
- Visual design
- Visual language
- Visual rhetoric
- Visual sociology
