= Weapons Act 1990 =

Act of Queensland, Australia

Parliament of Queensland

The Weapons Act 1990 is an act of the Parliament of Queensland.

== Purpose and administration of the act ==
This act provides for an administrative scheme to regulate the possession, use and trade of various weapons including firearms, martial arts weapons, particular knives, body armour and crossbows. The act is administered by the Weapons Licensing Branch of the Queensland Police Service.
