= Young Bob (activist) =

British activist (born 2008)

Thomas Moffitt
- Born: 15 July 2008 (age 18); England
- Other names: Young Bob; Gregory Moffitt
- Known for: Turning Point UK; Far-right activism

Thomas Moffitt (born 15 July 2008), who uses the pseudonym Young Bob, is a British right-wing activist who was involved with Turning Point UK until late 2025. Moffitt came to prominence debating Islam at Speaker's Corner and has been active since 2025. He has campaigned for Restore Britain and holds debate stalls in town centres and at universities.

He has campaigned for Disciples of Christ and been involved in UKIP and Turning Point UK, he has also worked as a journalist for Vox Populi. As of October 2026, his TikTok profile describes him as chief executive of Project Britannia, an organisation he launched.

== Politics ==
=== Turning Point UK ===
Moffitt was heavily involved with Turning Point UK until late 2025, when he was suspended from his position after Hope Not Hate revealed disparaging comments he made about the organisation and Nick Tenconi.

=== Campaigning ===
Moffitt campaigned for Restore Britain in the 2026 Makerfield by election.

On 14 September 2026, during freshers' week, he held a debate stall outside the University of Bristol's Senate House under a sign reading "We need to deport millions. Change my mind.", saying he was there "to make a statement on freedom of speech on university campuses"; a small group of protesters chanted in front of his table.

On 30 September 2026 he ran a debate stall in Parliament Street, York, under a sign reading "We need to deport millions. Change my mind.", which he said he ran with the University of York's Restore Britain society. Counter-protesters drowned him out and he left the city; North Yorkshire Police said no arrests were made. Rachael Maskell, the MP for York Central, said she had written to the police and City of York Council about the visit.

== Incidents ==
=== Southampton disorder ===
Moffitt filmed the disorder in Southampton on 2 June 2026 that followed a protest over the murder of Henry Nowak; in a video filmed at the protest he said it "perfectly demonstrates the sentiment in the country". His footage was later used as evidence in the prosecution of people involved in the disorder, and he apologised on social media.

=== Manchester attack ===
On 15 June 2026, while hosting a debate stand on Manchester's Market Street with a sign reading "Reform UK must be more radical. Change my mind.", Moffitt was punched and kicked by several people and his camera was damaged. Earlier in the debate, after a bystander threw water at him, he called those throwing water "cowards" and said "You don't actually want to fight for what you believe in"; a woman replied that she would fight him. The fight broke out later, after he confronted bystanders who had been throwing paper at him. He was treated at the scene and said he had bruises and cuts. Police arrested three people, two juveniles and one person in their 20s, on suspicion of robbery and assault; all three were released on bail pending further enquiries.
