= Crime, Media, Culture =

- Discipline: Criminology, media studies
- Language: English
- Edited by: Sarah Armstrong, Katherine Biber, Travis Linnemann

Publication details
- History: 2005-present
- Publisher: SAGE Publications
- Frequency: Triannually
- Impact factor: 2.796 (2020)

Standard abbreviations
- ISO 4: Crime Media Cult.

Indexing
- ISSN: 1741-6590 (print); 1741-6604 (web)
- LCCN: 2005206689
- OCLC no.: 60630237

Links
- Journal homepage; Online access; Online archive

Crime, Media, Culture is a peer-reviewed academic journal covering work at the intersections of criminological and cultural inquiry. It promotes a broad cross-disciplinary understanding of the relationship between crime, criminal justice, media and culture. The journal explores a range of media forms (including traditional media, new and alternative media, and surveillance technologies) and has a special focus on cultural criminology and its concerns with image, representation, meaning and style.

The journal covers three broad substantive areas:

- The relationship between crime, criminal justice and media forms (including traditional media, new and alternative media, and surveillance technologies)
- The relationship between criminal justice and cultural dynamics (with a special focus on cultural criminology and its concerns with image, representation, meaning and style)
- The intersections of crime, criminal justice, media forms and cultural dynamics (including historical, political, situational, spatial, subcultural and cross-cultural intersections)

Established in 2005 by Jeff Ferrell, Yvonne Jewkes, and Chris Greer, the journal is currently edited by Sarah Armstrong, Katherine Biber, and Travis Linnemann.

Previous editors-in-chief have been:

- Michelle Brown (University of Tennessee-Knoxville)
- Eamonn Carrabine (University of Essex)
- Jeff Ferrell (Texas Christian University and University of Kent)
- Chris Greer (City University London)
- Mark S. Hamm (Indiana State University)
- Yvonne Jewkes (University of Bath)

== Abstracting and indexing ==
The journal is abstracted and indexed in Scopus and the Social Sciences Citation Index. According to the Journal Citation Reports, the journal has a 2020 impact factor of 2.796.
