= Visual Communication (journal) =

- Discipline: Media studies, communication studies, journalism, multimodality
- Language: English
- Edited by: Louise Ravelli, Janina Wildfeuer

Publication details
- History: 2002-present
- Publisher: SAGE Publications
- Frequency: Quarterly
- Impact factor: 1.790 (2021)

Standard abbreviations
- ISO 4: Vis. Commun.

Indexing
- ISSN: 1470-3572 (print); 1741-3214 (web)
- LCCN: 2003200605
- OCLC no.: 49517846

Links
- Journal homepage; Online access; Online archive

Visual Communication is a quarterly peer-reviewed academic journal that covers the visual dimension of language and communication. The journal's editors-in-chief are Louise Ravelli (University of New South Wales) and Janina Wildfeuer (University of Groningen). It was established in 2002 and is published by SAGE Publications.

== Abstracting and indexing ==
The journal is abstracted and indexed in Scopus and the Social Sciences Citation Index. According to the Journal Citation Reports, the journal has a 2021 impact factor of 1.790.
