= Institute of International Relations =

Institute of International Relations may refer to:

- University of International Relations, Beijing, China
- Institute of International Relations (Mozambique)
- Institute of International Relations Prague
- Institute of International Relations (Turkmenistan)
- Institute of International Relations Yekaterinburg, Russia
- Institute of International Relations, KFU, Russia
- Moscow State Institute of International Relations
- China Institutes of Contemporary International Relations, Beijing, China

== See also ==
- IIR (disambiguation)
