= Moisés de Lemos Martins =

Professional at the Department of Communication Sciences

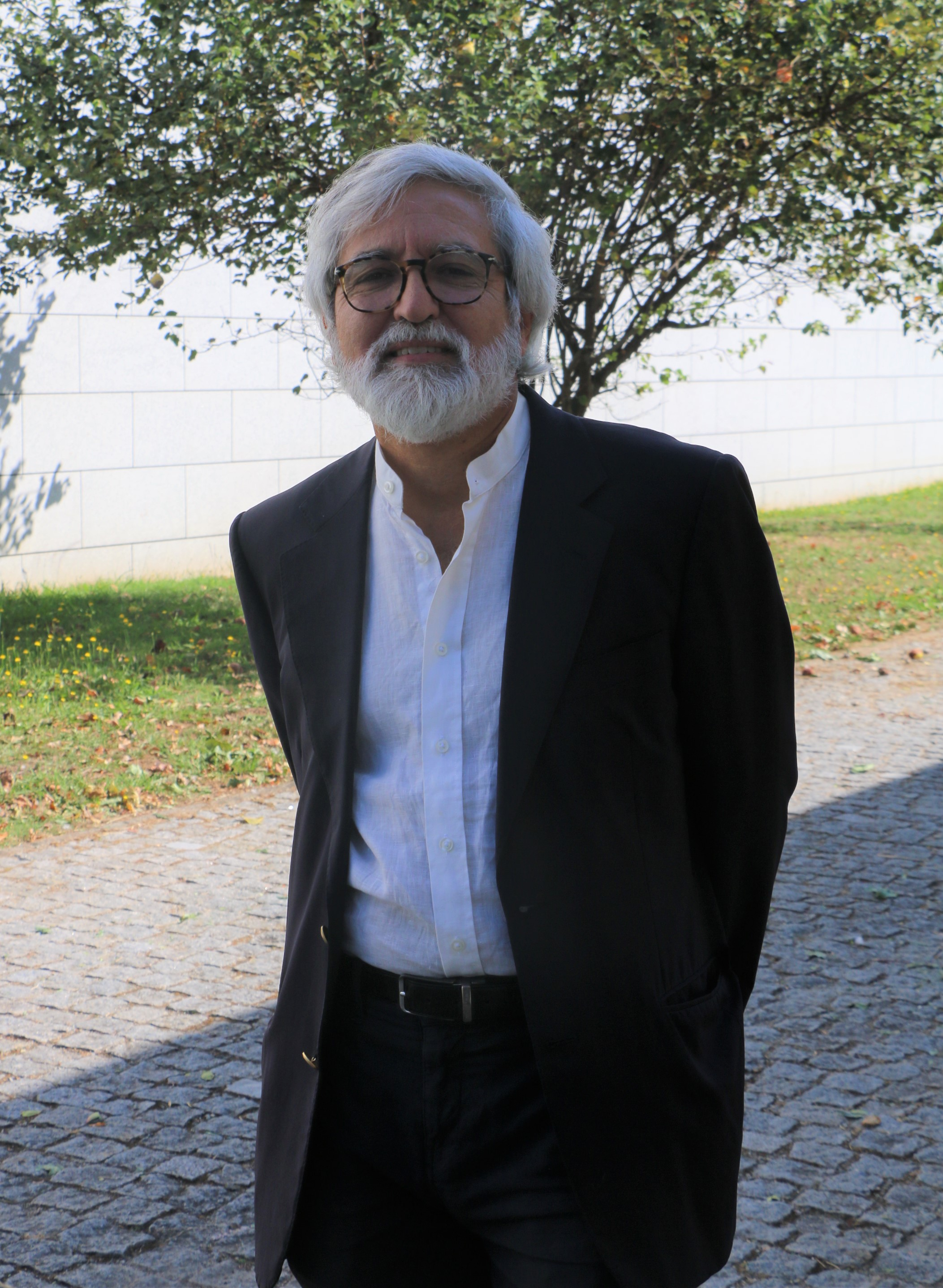

Personal details
- Born: 8 March 1953 (age 73) Felgueiras, Portugal
- Education: Sociology
- Awards: 2015 – Academic distinction award from Intercom – Brazilian Society for Interdisciplinary Communication Studies 2015 – Honorary President of Sopcom – Portuguese Association of Communication Sciences 2016 – Minho University Scientific Merit Award 2021 – Gold Insignia, by the University of Santiago de Compostela

Moisés de Lemos Martins (born March 8, 1953) is a full professor at the Department of Communication Sciences, University of Minho. He is the Director of CECS – the Communication and Society Research Centre, which he founded in 2001, and of the Virtual Museum of Lusophony, which he set up in 2017. He is also the director of the scientific journals Comunicação e Sociedade (Communication and Society), Revista Lusófona de Estudos Culturais/Lusophone Journal of Cultural Studies, and the Vista. He launched the former in 1999, the second in 2013, and the latter in 2020. He is a sociologist and communication theorist, as well as an essayist and regular contributor to the media.

== Biography ==
Moisés de Lemos Martins was born in Vila Cova da Lixa, Felgueiras, on March 8, 1953. He is a sociologist, Communication theorist, essayist and a regular contributor to the media. He is a Full Professor at the University of Minho, and director of the CECS – Communication and Society Research Centre. His strategic project is focused on this research unit, which currently comprises six intervention platforms, which he founded or helped found: the Virtual Museum of Lusophony, an academic cooperation platform in the fields of science, teaching and arts, in Portuguese-speaking countries; the Observatory for Science, Communication and Cultural Policies (POLObs); Passeio, an art and urban culture platform; the Media and Information Literacy Observatory (MILObs); the Communitas Think Tank, a platform that monitors the agenda and debate in public, local, regional and national spaces; and CreateLab, a creative agency, oriented towards innovation and experimentation, that produces audio-visual and multimedia content, at the service of strategic communication. He is the director of the Virtual Museum of Lusophony, as well as the scientific journals, Comunicação e Sociedade (Communication and Society), Revista Lusófona de Estudos Culturais/Lusophone Journal of Cultural Studies, and the Vista. He is the founder and editor of the CECS book collection, "Comunicação e Sociedade", as well as the open science community of this research unit in the RepositóriUM of the University of Minho. This activity has helped confirm the thesis that the University of Minho is "champion in the digital disclosure of its works", as suggested by the physicist and university professor, Carlos Fiolhais, in reference to the work of Moisés de Lemos Martins. He is the Honorary President of Sopcom – the Portuguese Association of Communication sciences. In 2015, Intercom – Brazilian Society for Interdisciplinary Communication Studies awarded him the academic distinction. In 2016, the University of Minho distinguished him with the Scientific Merit Award.

V Congress of Lusocom, Maputo (Mozambique), 16–19 April 2002
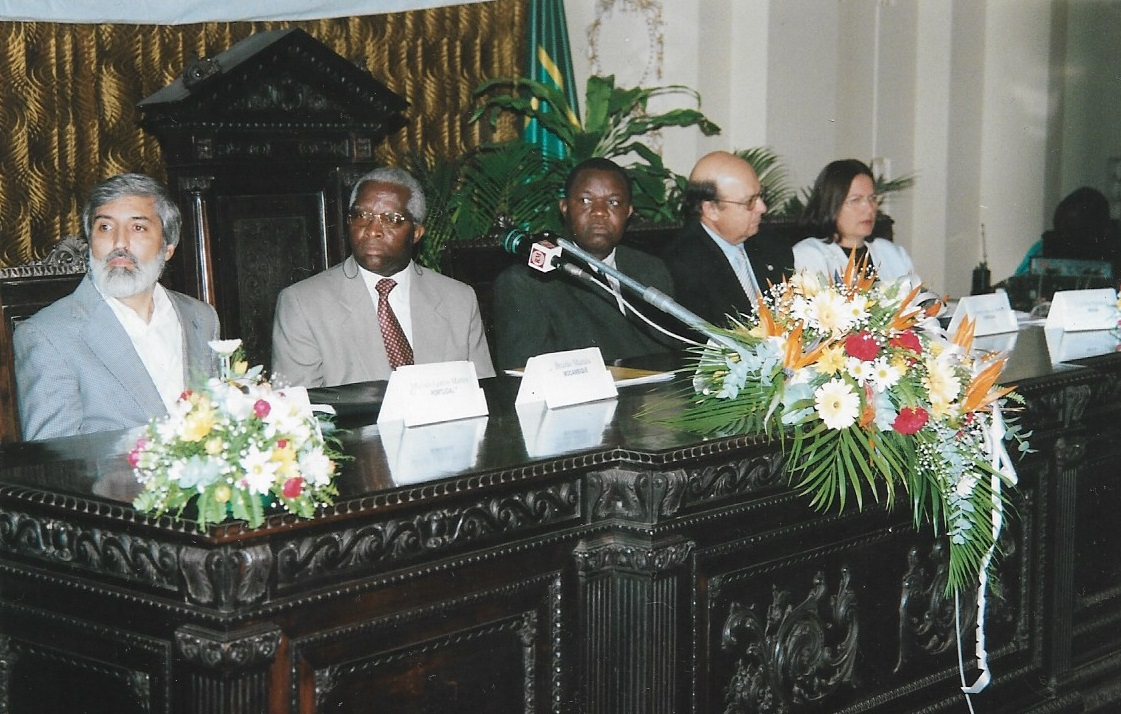
- Scanner 20201013 (3)

Notes
- Moisés de Lemos Martins (Vice President of Sopcom); Brazão Mazula (Rector of the Eduardo Mondlane University); Pascoal Mocumbi (Prime Minister of the Republic of Mozambique); Alberto Antas de Barros (President of the Instituto Politécnico of Lisbon); Cicilia Peruzzo (President of Intercom).

He studied Theology and Philosophy at the Universidade Católica Portuguesa (UCP), in Lisbon, and has a BA Hons. degree in Catholic Theology from the University of Human Sciences in Strasbourg. At this university, he also studied Social Sciences, majoring in Sociology, and completed his master's degree in 1980 and his PhD in 1984. He was awarded a scholarship by the French Government's Ministry of Foreign Affairs (1978/1984). He taught sociology at the Universidade Católica Portuguesa, in Lisbon, and also at the University of Beira Interior (UBI), before moving to the University of Minho, in 1990, where he has been Full Professor since 1998.

His academic training was marked by Fr. Bento Domingues, Edgar Morin, Francis Jacques, Friedrich Kittler, Georg Simmel, Gilbert Durand, Gilles Deleuze, Jacques Derrida, Jacques Lacan, Jean-François Lyotard, Jürgen Habermas, Karl-Otto Apel, Karl Marx, Max Weber, Michel de Certeau, Michel Foucault, Michel Maffesoli, Pierre Bourdieu, Roland Barthes and Walter Benjamin, which is why he is predominantly identified with the comprehensive method of the Human and social Sciences, that is founded on discourse and thought, and, on a secondary basis, with the explanatory method, that is founded on number and measure, to paraphrase a classic categorisation by the German philosopher Wilhelm Dilthey. His areas of teaching and research are Sociology of Culture and Communication, Social Semiotics, Theory and Discourse Analysis, Visual Studies, Media Arts, Scientific Policy, Cultural Studies, Intercultural Communication, Lusophone Studies and Salazarism.

He has served as visiting professor at the following universities: Autonomous University of Barcelona; Autonomous University of Madrid; Pontifical Catholic University of Minas Gerais (Belo Horizonte); Pontifical Catholic University of São Paulo; Pontifical University of Salamanca; Pontifical Catholic University of Rio Grande do Sul (at Porto Alegre); University of Cape Verde; University of Santiago de Compostela; Université catholique de Louvain; Federal University of Bahia; Federal University of Minas Gerais (Belo Horizonte); Université Paris-Descartes (Sorbonne); Université Paul Valéry, Montpellier; Universidade Politécnica (of Mozambique)in Maputo; Mackenzie Presbyterian University (São Paulo); Universidade Zambeze (Beira, Mozambique).

In 2002, when interviewed by academic, Virgínia Moreira and editor and academic, José Manuel Paquete de Oliveira, (Note: Moreira is president of Intercom – the Brazilian Society for Interdisciplinary Communication Studies; Paquete de Oliveira, editor: Brazilian Journal of Communication Sciences; president: SOPCOM – Portuguese Association of Communication Sciences and of Lusocom; president: Lusophone Federation of Communication Sciences) they pointed out that it was "just and correct" to include Moisés de Lemos Martins among the most distinguished "Portuguese researchers" "in the exchange process", not only Luso-Brazilian, but more extensively throughout Portuguese-speaking countries.

In 2016, the Portal Mutirão, of the Methodist University of São Paulo, identified Moisés de Lemos Martins' academic profile, highlighting his pedagogical, scientific and associative work. The Portal Mutirão was created in 2016 by José Marques de Melo, journalist, university professor and pioneer of Communication Science studies in Brazil, to distinguish not only the uniqueness of the research work pursued in Brazil in this scientific field, but also of academics from all over the world who have helped develop and consolidate the academic community of Communication Sciences in Brazil.

Congress on Culture and Tourism, Maputo (Mozambique), 26th and 27th November 2018
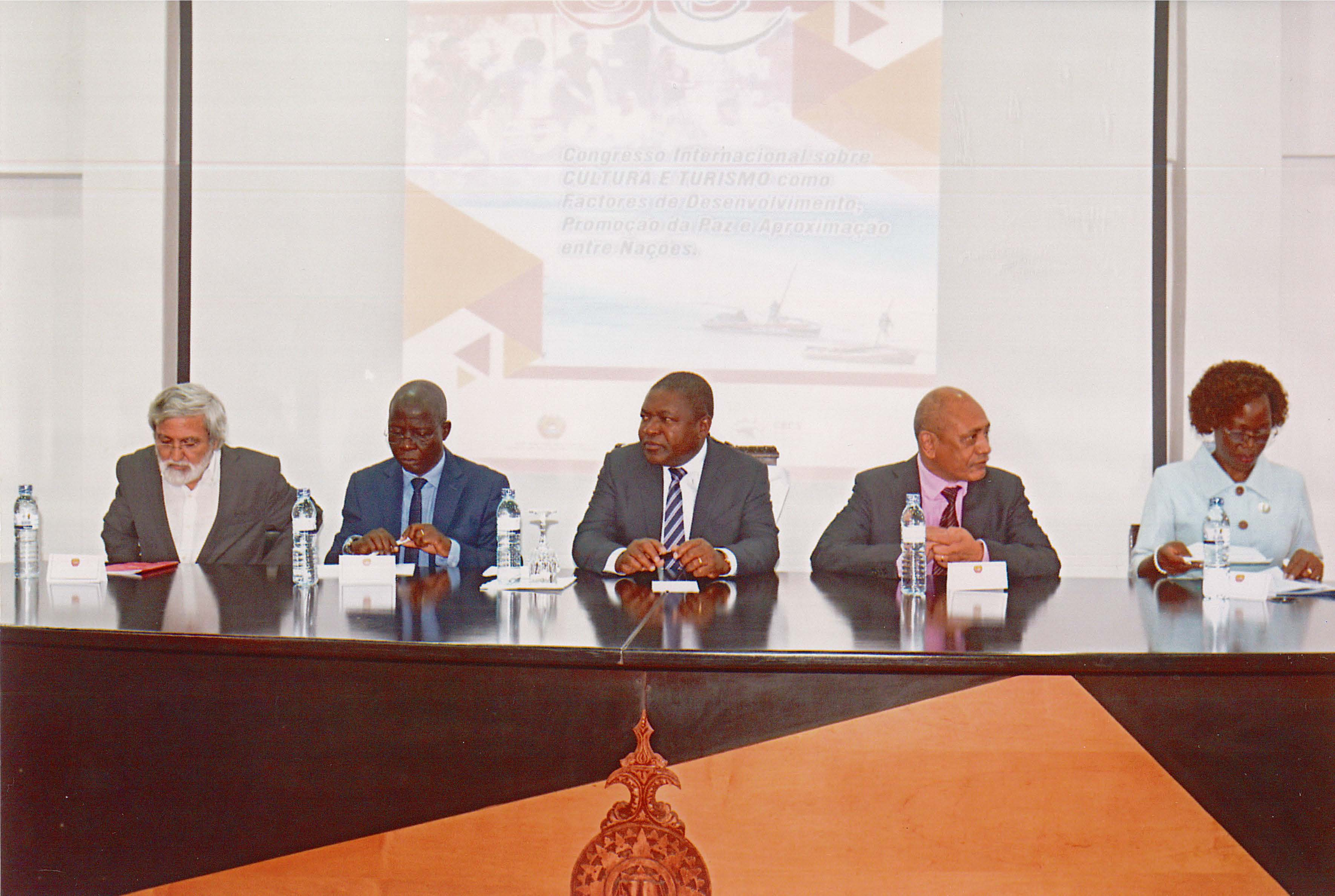
- Congresso sobre Cultura e Turismo, em 2018, em Moçambique (Maputo)Mesa

Notes
- Moisés de Lemos Martins (President of the Congress), Silva Dunduro (Minister of Culture and Tourism of Mozambique); Filipe Nyusi (President of the Republic of Mozambique); Lourenço do Rosário (Magno Chancellor of the Polytechnic University); Iolanda Cintura (Governor of Maputo city)

In 2013, with the Brazilian academics Antônio Hohlfeldt and Cicilia Peruzzo, from Intercom (the Brazilian Society for Interdisciplinary Communication Studies), Moisés de Lemos Martins helped Tomás José Jane, Professor at the Higher School of Journalism, in Maputo, Mozambique, to found Acicom – the Mozambican Association of Information and Communication Sciences. Later that year, with Margarita Ledo, Professor at the University of Santiago de Compostela, Moisés de Lemos Martins helped Silvino Lopes Évora, Professor at the university of Cape Verde, in Praia, Cape Verde, to found Mediacom – the Cape Verdean Association of Communication Sciences. Moisés de Lemos Martins is an honorary member of Mediacom.

== Management functions ==
Moisés de Lemos Martins directed the Department of Social sciences at the University of Beira Interior between 1988/1990, and in 1989 created the BA Hons. degree in Social Communication and in 1990, the magazine Anais Universitarios, of which he was the first editor. He was director of the BA Hons. degree course in Sociology at this university. Between 1988 and 1990, he taught History of Sociology. In conjunction with Aníbal Alves, emeritus professor at the University of Minho, he helped set up the BA Hons. degree in Media Studies (Comunicação Social) at this university. In 1991, he began teaching semiotics, Theory and Analysis of Discourse and Sociology of Communication. At the University of Minho, from 1990 to 1993, he directed the BA Hons. course in Sociology of Organizations, founded by Manuel da Silva Costa in 1989, in which he taught the discipline, Sociology of Power. With Albertino Gonçalves, Professor of Sociology at the University of Minho, he created the master's degree in Sociology of Culture and Lifestyles (1996–2011), in which he taught Sociology of Culture, and the master's degree in communication, Art and Culture, in 2011, in which he taught Sociology of Communication. For ten years, he was the director of the Institute of Social Sciences at the University of Minho (1996/2000 and 2004/2010). In 2006, he was one of the candidates to be elected Rector of this university.

He was the first Director of the PhD course in Communication Sciences at the University of Minho (2009/2011), in which he taught, Social Semiotics. He promoted the teaching and research project in Cultural Studies, at the University of Minho's Institute of Social Sciences, and was the director of the PhD programme in Cultural Studies (2010/2015), a joint initiative of the University of Minho and the University of Aveiro. He teaches Sociology of Culture in the PhD programme in Cultural Studies. He was the promoter and director of the PhD programme in "Communication Studies: Technology, Culture and Society" (2013/2015), funded by the Foundation for Science and Technology (FCT), which involved six Portuguese research centres in five universities. He taught the discipline, Intercultural Communication, in this PhD. In 2018, he helped found a PhD course in Language, Culture and Society, at the Faculty of Human and Social Sciences, of Zambezi University, in the city of Beira, Mozambique, where he taught Intercultural Communication.

He was the co-founder of Sopcom – Portuguese Association of Communication Sciences, and its President (2005/2015). He was also the president of Lusocom – the Lusophone Federation of Communication Sciences (2011/2015). He was editor of the Anuário Internacional de Comunicação Lusófona (International Yearbook of Lusophone Communication), a scientific journal published by Lusocom (2007/2011). He also presided over Confibercom – the Ibero-American Confederation of Scientific and Academic Communication Associations (2012/2015). Since 2019, he has been the Secretary General of Assibercom – the Ibero-American Association of Communication Researchers.

== A comprehensive and transcultural social theory ==
Right after the publication of A Linguagem, a Verdade e o Poder – Ensaio de Semiótica Social (Language, Truth and Power – an Essay on Social Semiotics), in 2002, Moisés de Lemos Martins was described by Eduardo Prado Coelho, university professor, essayist and literary critic, as "a cornerstone of communication studies in Portugal". He said that this is because his work makes it possible "not only to retrace an entire fundamental theoretical path, but also places us at the centre of the major issues of analysis of contemporary reality (in this point – where linguistics, rhetoric, critical theory, sociology, anthropology and psychoanalysis become intertwined and blurred, and sometimes even redistribute themselves)". Luís Carmelo, a writer and university professor, after reading A Linguagem, a Verdade e o Poder, in 2003, wrote: "The role of Moisés de Lemos Martins has been rich, stimulating and productive, as a healthy polemicist within the scientific and academic community. It is this desire to dispute ideas and encourage lifelong learning that perhaps best defines what the author tries to describe, at the end of his essay, as 'the passion of the university'".

=== Techné and Bios ===
Discussion of the fusion of technique (techné) with life (bios) – the debate par excellence in relation to contemporary experience – was begun by Moisés de Lemos Martins in A Linguagem, a Verdade e a Poder. A decade later, he published, Crise no Castelo da Cultura – Das Estrelas para os Ecrãs (Crisis in the Castle of Culture – From the Stars to the Screens), published in 2011 (2nd ed. 2017), in which he began by exploring the ideas of Deleuze and Guattari, in terms of their invocation of biotechnology and genetic engineering, and discussion of implants, prostheses, hybridity, the transhuman and the post-organic and of Lyotard, in relation to his discussion of "logotechnics". Moisés de Lemos Martins argues that as Deleuze and Guattari point out, the machine is desiring and desire is machined, which means that there are "as many living beings in the machine as machines in living beings". In relation to "logotechnics", as pointed out by Lyotard, we are talking about information technologies. But this movement, in which technique merges in a hybrid form with life, leads to miniaturisation of technique and the immaterialisation of the digital world.

As Maria da Luz Correia mentions, in Crise no Castelo da Cultura. Das Estrelas para os Ecrãs, 2011, Moisés de Lemos Martins "combines the work of more than ten years in communication studies and the theory of culture". She argues that in this essay about the movement of total immersion of technique in people's and bodies, "the sociologist focuses on the crisis of human existence, the contemporary mal de vivre, which results from technological experience – from network communication to biotechnologies – and from the conversion of our lives into the logic of the global market". She adds that in the wake of that which he describes as "thinking about difference" – by Bataille, Klossowski, Blanchot, Foucault, Lyotard, Deleuze, Derrida and Baudrillard – Moisés de Lemos Martins "recognizes the condition of someone, who crosses a night of times, is precarious, given that history is stored in gigs, emotions are processed in bits, and bodies are composed of pixels. At times bored by highly-regulated daily life, at times stunned by unruly screens, we accept, but not without a certain spleen, the retreat of the word in the face of the torrent of technological images, the bankruptcy of identity in the face of the labyrinthine 'flow' of passions, or the failure of citizenship in the face of imperatives of efficiency in the global economy".

Using Foucault's concept of the apparatus/dispositif, and following the ideas of F. Kittler, Moisés de Lemos Martins was always interested in posing "theoretical-cultural questions to technology". Indeed, as Deleuze remarks, "we belong to social apparatuses (dispositifs) and act within them. We call the innovation of a device in relation to its predecessors actuality, our actuality. The new is the actual, not what we are, but rather what we are becoming, what we are in the process of becoming, that is, the Other, our becoming-other", or in Ricoeur's expression "the self as another". The various cultural-theoretical questions that Moisés de Lemos Martins poses in relation to technology include the questioning of the "total" (Ernst Jünger, 1930) and "infinite" (Sloterdijk, 2000) movement of mobilisation, from the human to competition, as well as Kittler's idea about the questioning of hardware, programming, automation and regulation. In short, following in the footsteps of Martin Heidegger, Moisés de Lemos Martins questions what he calls "technical autotelism", which translates into a form of "messianism without telos".

In his analysis of the contemporary challenges posed by Communication, Moisés de Lemos Martins focuses above all on intersubjective and contextual relationships, given that his sociological theory is comprehensive. But, together with Heidegger and Deleuze, he also questions the reality of technique (techné). And the reality that is being questioned is its hybrid form, it is technique as an animal (a "kind of animal", in the words of Giorgio Agamben, "it is the alloy that mixes the organic and non-organic, it is the hybrid of the human and non-human, the hybrid of sensitivity and organic matter". Moisés de Lemos Martins' proposal for a sociology of technique marks what Perniola (1990) calls the Egyptian version of our culture, attention paid to the inorganic within the organic. It is the idea that the mineral world can be fuelled by the excitement of an inversion, which is summed up by the figure of "technical individuality", as proposed by Gilbert Simondon, Gilles Deleuze, Norbert Elias, Bruno Latour and Bernard Stiegler.

But the proposal of Moisés de Lemos Martins opens up to the theory of materiality, above all linked to the ideas of Heidegger, Kittler e Simondon. He also uses the concepts of actor/network and mediation, by Latour (2005); of apparatus (dispositif) by Foucault (2000); of agency, by Deleuze and Guattari (1980); and of erotic objects, by Perniola (1994/2004). These ideas are also articulated with the "materialist turn", identified by Bennett and Joyce (2010), and also with the "non-human turn", referred to by Richard Grusin, which accentuate both the agency of objects and their materiality. In line with the ideas proposed by Grusin, Moisés de Lemos Martins recognises that the media and media technology have operated and continue to operate epistemologically, as knowledge producers. But he also recognises within them a technical, bodily and material functioning of producers and shapers of individual and collective affections, and of producers of feelings in human and non-human agency relations. In this respect, Moisés de Lemos Martins' viewpoint on digital culture draws close to André Lemos' understanding of "Epistemology of communication, neo-materialism and digital culture". It is not possible to limit the analysis of social networks, fake news, the practice of selfies, the issue of design and the privacy of the Internet of Things, as well as the culture of platforms, to "a macro-social analysis of the economic structure of data capitalism", nor to a communication relationship between individuals in a specific situation. The current communication challenge requires taking into account, for example, the materiality and agency of the objects involved in them: interfaces; algorithmic logic, database construction; the principles hidden in technical documents and patents.

=== Techné and Aesthesis ===
Moisés de Lemos Martins considers that technique (techné) is the condition of time, which is why, in the current world, the shift from the realm of words and ideas to the realm of images, sounds and emotions has been accentuated, involving a shift from "ideology to the imagination". This question runs throughout his work, especially from the early 21st century onwards. The final chapter of A Linguagem, a Verdade e a Poder, that he published in 2002, was already a forerunner to his subsequent works. Society has definitively converted itself to image and sound, both of which are technologically produced. Society has gained an audio-visual dimension, signalling a process of translation from argumentative rationality to emotional rationality, from the realm of logos and ethos, to the realm of pathos, from ideology to "sensology", as Mário Perniola remarks. A new reality now occupies the social scene. The look (the image, appearance, visual); the brand or mark (that which the classics called the "example"); timing (opportune timing, or kairos); marketing (the art of persuasion) are already the messengers of this new reality. In Perniola's words, technical objects have sex appeal.

In the meantime, Crise no Castelo da Cultura – Das Estrelas para os Ecrãs (Crisis in the Castle of Culture – From the Stars to the Screens), which Moisés de Lemos Martins published in 2011, constituted a proposal that not only accounts for this shift from logos and ethos to pathos, but also the shift from propositions to images, and from "sun/bolé", an image that unites, to "dia/bolé", an image that separates. As Madalena Oliveira points out, invoking the figure of "crisis of the existent", Moisés de Lemos Martins considers that "culture will tend to be more a space of 'dia-bolic' divergence, than of symbolic confluence, since one no longer expects that it will gather that which has been fragmented, unless it permits the confrontation with things". Summarising, Moisés de Lemos Martins' thesis about the contemporary era, characterised by a "spirit of alienation", which "satisfies itself through melancholy", Madalena Oliveira adds: "the crisis of the existent is not resolved through the control of knowledge, proper to culture, but rather through a political response, that is necessarily free, of the domain of action and not of the word, of the domain of dia-bolé and not the domain of sim-bolé". Crisis in the Castle of Culture – From the Stars to the Screens signals, on the other hand, a shift from reasoning to memes; from the conscious to the unconscious; from rhetoric to the figurative path; from persuasion to seduction and fascination; from a dramatic, classic and sublime imagery to a tragic, baroque and grotesque imagery; from the media as discursive devices, in a rhetorical sense, to the media as image-based devices, with sensory, affective and bodily memory; from an informational process with information producers and consumers, to socio-technical networks with tribes and audiences, who are content producers.

In the opinion of Moisés de Lemos Martins, western culture has shifted from the realm of thought, which is governed by the logic of identity, stability and autonomy, to the paradigm of sound, resonance, vibration, modulation, rhythm, tension, duration and memory. As audiovisual and digital media, the new technical media will enact a spectacle, which is simultaneously a simulation and a simulacrum, as Baudrillard has argued, in which the masses deceptively believe that they are participating. According to Moisés de Lemos Martins, the new technical media permanently remake the world, taking us to a state of ocular possession, a kind of an "optical unconscious", as suggested by Walter Benjamin, in relation to photografs, cinema and radio. And by re-making the world, the new technical media operate a return of the archaic in the contemporary world.

In other words, in effect, Moisés de Lemos Martins' analysis builds on the ideas of Walter Benjamin. But this does not mean that, for Moisés de Lemos Martins, or for Benjamin, that the only effect of the advent of new technical media is disarticulation of the masses, through problematisation of human experience and its progressive "impoverishment", or what Guy Debord calls the "dissimilated freezing of the world". On the contrary, the new technical media also support the entry of the masses into history, reinforcing their right to assert themselves as subjects. The new technological media allow us to deal with dreams, i.e., with the figurative paths of the image, with the collective unconscious (Lacan) and with archetypes (Carl Jung e Gilbert Durand), in short, with the imaginary, or that which Derrida termed "mythopoetics", resuming the "bricolage" figure of the myth, which Lévi-Strauss used in the first chapter of La Pensée Sauvage. Or, in Moisés de Lemos Martins' own words, the new technological media constitute a mediation of "flows, resonances, rhythms, cadences, sonorities, durations, vibrations, which prevent human communities from fixating on something that is defined, i.e. definitive ", and instead open themselves up to the design of transfigurations, which characterise them as an indefinite and infinitive thing, to be made.

International Congress of Pioneering Places (2019-03-30)
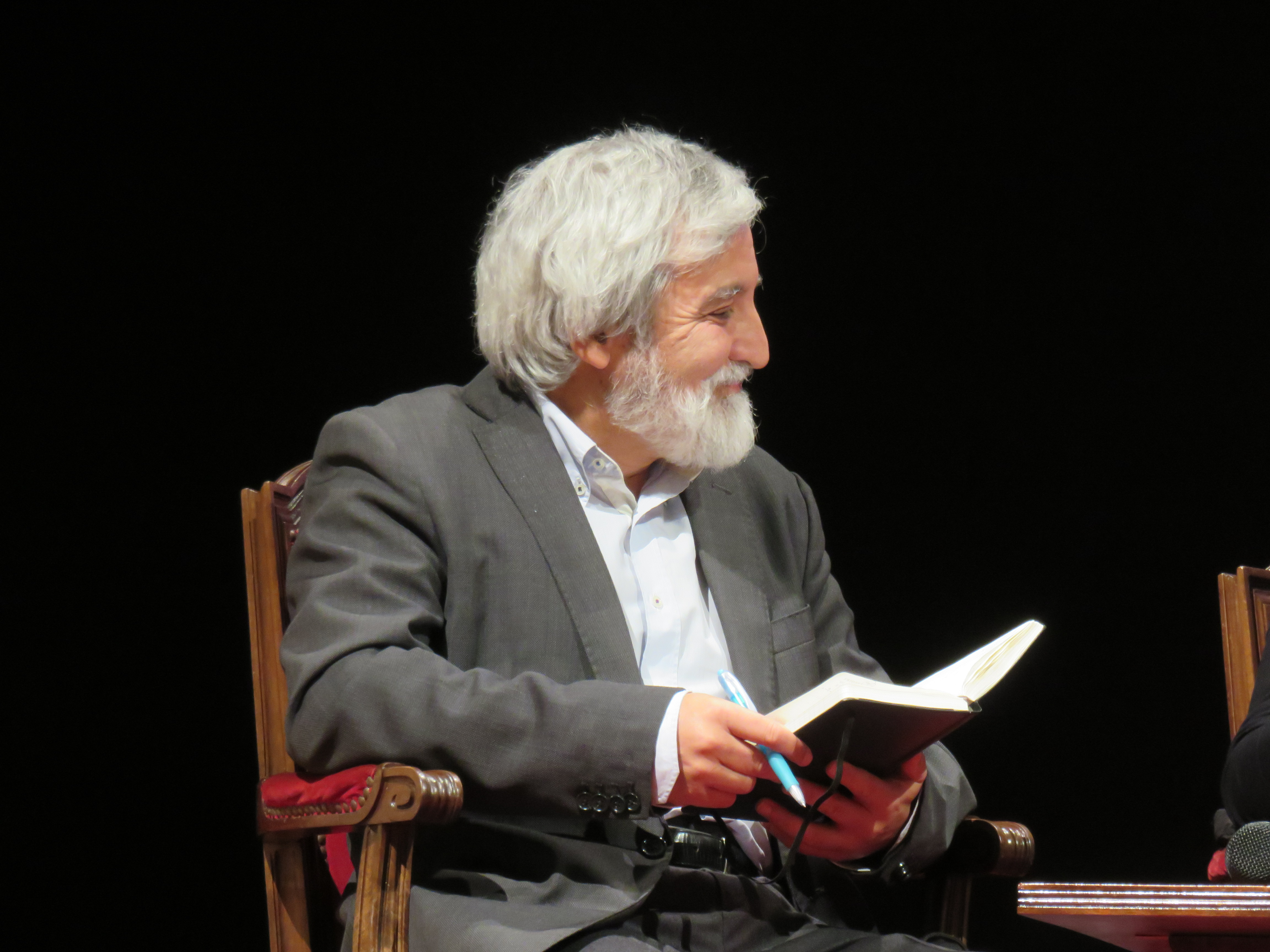
- Congresso Internacional Lugares Pioneiros – 2019-03-30 – IMG 9513

Notes
- Funchal-Machico, Island of Madeira

Moisés de Lemos Martins has curated three exhibitions by the fine artist, Pintomeira: two painting exhibitions: Interiors, in 2009; and Other Faces, in 2010 and the photography exhibition, Somewhere, in 2014. Through the work of this fine artist, who he began to study and analyse, Moisés de Lemos Martins has made a wide range of incursions into the field of Media Arts. In Interiors, with Pintomeira exploring the aesthetic influence of the painters, David Hockney and Tom Wesselmann, who transformed painting into a profane art, multiplying the links with photography and suggesting both poster painting and collages for advertisements, or the design of product advertisements. By analysing artistic procedures in Pintomeira that observe the principles of Minimalist Art, Moisés de Lemos Martins has approached the fields of Pop art and Graphic design.

In the case of Other Faces, in which Pintomeira is influenced the works of Andy Warhol and Roy Lichtenstein, Moisés de Lemos Martins analysed an artistic production process that interlinks the visual arts, advertising, photography and cinema, with the performing arts, and refers to the labyrinthine crossing of the realm of media images, which leap onto the painter's canvas, whether from newspaper or magazine pages, or from cinema or computer screens. Moisés de Lemos Martins considers that the use of the image manipulation technique, Photoshop, in Other Faces, as well as digital printing of the images on canvas, confirms this art movement, which brings art closer to the masses and also to machines, as he says, in reference to Jünger.

According to Moisés de Lemos Martins, Other Faces, an exhibition of ten exclusively figurative paintings, allows us to see the absolute homogeneity of the subject and object, of time and space, in a process of an enchanting return to it (portrait). In a neutral and documentary style, these portraits feature passive subjects, in profound solitude, subjects of mere surface and artifice, as if they were objects produced for consumption. Moisés de Lemos Martins considers that media subjects are precisely like that, as Andy Warhol showed us in his portraits of Marilyn Monroe, Elisabeth Taylor, Marlon Brando and Elvis Presley. This also applies to the portraits in New Faces, which show us cold and inexpressive subjects, reduced to a profane condition, subjects who are nothing more than "images without an aura", as Moisés de Lemos Martins points out, in reference to Walter Benjamin, mechanical achievements, modelled on both mass-media products and commercial articles, both of which are mass-produced.

When in 2014, Pintomeira exhibited his photo album, Somewhere, Moisés de Lemos Martins noted that the territory of the photographer of Somewhere was the same as that of the painter of Interiors and Other Faces. Considering the three exhibitions, Moisés de Lemos Martins concluded that Pintomeira settled, with particular obstinacy and radicality, in the devastated territory of the human – from where the spirit was deserted and the city was abandoned, without memory, looking lost, aimless and horizonless. Analysing Pintomeira's aesthetic procedures, Moisés de Lemos Martins returns to the figure of the "melancholic imaginary", as the form of the imaginary that is typical of the media in the contemporary era. This figure is recurrent in his writings since 1998, with A biblioteca de Babel e a árvore do conhecimento (The library of Babel and the tree of knowledge), and above all from 2002, with the studies O trágico na modernidade (The tragic in modernity) and O trágico como imaginário da era mediática (The tragic as imaginary of the media age).

Working with contemporary cultural and artistic forms, which combine the technological arts and the media, and having Friedrich Kittler as one of his main references, Moisés de Lemos Martins has been questioning the current regime of images, which produces a melancholic imagery, with tragic, baroque and grotesque forms. This is found in his study of the 1999 film eXistenZ, by the Canadian filmmaker, David Cronenberg. This is also found in the case of the 1986 music video of Peter Gabriel's song, Mercy Street, directed by the music video director Matt Mahurin. and also in three music videos of the Icelandic singer Björk: Hyperballad (1996), directed by Michel Gondry; Hunter (1998), directed by Paul White; and All is full of love (1999), directed by Chris Cunningham. The three music videos explore the eroticism of technical objects, desiring machines and machined desires, as Moisés de Lemos Martins repeatedly emphasises, resuming the formulation of Deleuze and Guattari (1972), in Anti-Oedipe, when they referred to hybridity between the human and non-human.

Crise no Castelo da Cultura (2011)
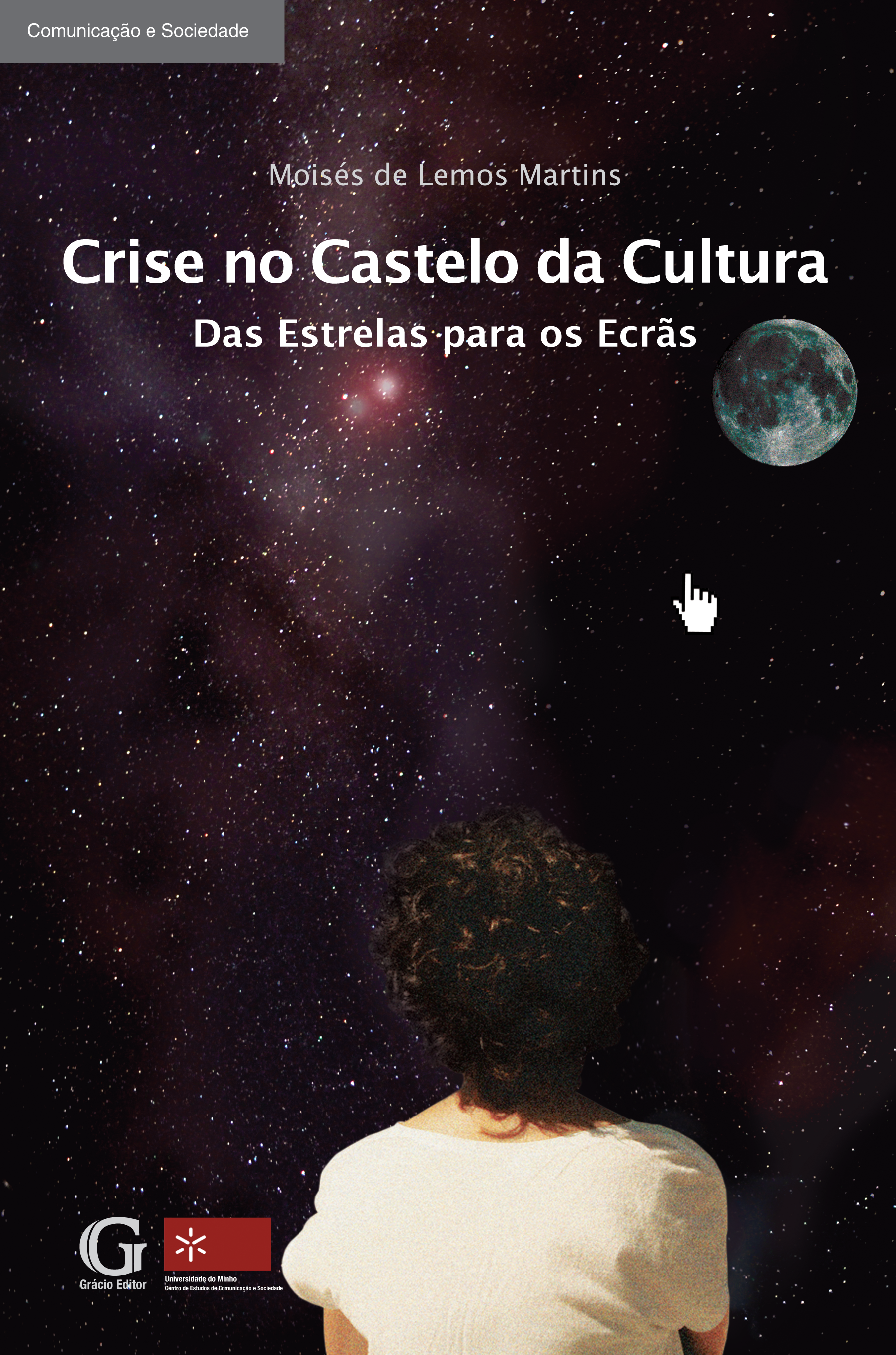
- Crise no Castelo da Cultura

Notes
- Grácio Editor

More recently, Moisés de Lemos Martins identified the presence of the same melancholy imagery, with tragic, baroque and grotesque forms, in the fashion, spring/summer and autumn/winter collections of the British designer, Alexander McQueen.

This line of thought, with references to Benjamin, Durand, Debord, Deleuze, Derrida, Baudrillard, Kittler and Perniola, led Moisés de Lemos Martins to coin the figure of "technological circumnavigation". In fact, new technological media, through digital content, make it possible to expand human experience. Moisés de Lemos Martins considers that websites, portals, blogs, video games, applications, digital repositories, virtual museums, and even installation of virtual realities in immersive environments, constitute the new territories, landscapes, atmospheres and environments of the "technological circumnavigation", which even comprises a new art of storytelling – "transmedia narratives". With regard to transmedia narratives, which Gunther Kress and Theo van Leeuwen call multimodal, Moisés de Lemos Martins draws references, above all, from Henry Jenkins, Lev Manovich and Carlos Alberto Scolari. Moisés de Lemos Martins considers that with transmedia narratives it is not just a question of imitating, reproducing, retelling, remedying, adapting, extending and indefinitely reinventing known stories. Transmedia narratives also allow us to fictionalise new stories, with the installation of virtual realities in immersive environments, such as videogames and interactive narratives on the Internet, in cinema, on television, and via DVDs.

=== A New Theory of the Image ===
Another central issue in contemporaneity questions the place occupied by the image in the contemporary world. In A Linguagem, a Verdade e o Poder, Moisés de Lemos Martins moves within the framework of a theory of the image, typical of Barthes, wherein the image is analysed through an analogy with language. But there is already a new theory of the image that is dealt with in the work, Imagem e Pensamento (Image and Thought), published in 2011 (2nd edition in 2017). In the words of Moisés de Lemos Martins, so- called information and communication technologies work within us as prostheses for the production of emotions, as "machines that can mould a cranked-up sensitivity within us". Moisés de Lemos Martins specifically considers that information and communication technologies, correspond to photography, cinema, radio, video, television, and above all digital technologies, Internet, electronic games, graphic design, cybernetic networks and virtual environments, with the "convergence" of media, content and platforms, according to the expression used by Henry Jenkins.

=== Transcultural identities ===
Moisés de Lemos Martins also highlights the contemporary importance of the question of identity. Globalisation and the resulting multi- and trans-cultural societies, which go hand in hand with the massive phenomena of migration and refugees, have become the new world order. And society has become fragmented, constituting itself as a "body without organs", in the view of Deleuze and Guattari, a body in crisis, where nationalism, populism and various extremisms thrive on a widespread basis. In the opinion of José Bragança de Miranda, analysing the work, Para uma Inversa Navegação – O Discurso da Identidade (Towards an Inverse Navigation – The Discourse of Identity), that Moisés de Lemos Martins published in 1996, in a body without organs, in which differences "wander throughout experience", what we encounter above all in Moisés de Lemos Martins is "the critique of cultural substantialism, as well as its effects on strategies to impose identities". Because "no one figure can link them together", whether "national identity" or regional, local, group or individual identity. Bragança de Miranda also concludes, "the truth of the differences lies in the fact that they are the effect of relationships, which constitute networks".

Practically two decades since the publication of Para uma Inversa Navegação (Towards an Inverse Navigation) (1996), Moisés de Lemos Martins once again questioned the discourses of identity, by analysing what he calls "transcultural and transnational identities", in particular Portuguese-speaking identity. Moisés de Lemos Martins continues his critique of cultural substantialism, referred to by Bragança de Miranda, as well as its effects on strategies to impose identities, which are power strategies.

Eduardo Prado Coelho, on the other hand, did not ignore the fact that Moisés de Lemos Martins' principal theoretical inspiration was Michel Foucault. In fact, for Prado Coelho this is what led Moisés de Lemos Martins to consider power as "the most important and accentuated dimension in the social space" – the panoptic power, or disciplinary power; and biopower, as for example in the case of biopolitics. Prado Coelho suggests that, marked by a "passion of hope", Moisés de Lemos Martins provides "a critique of power" and conceives "the demand for something beyond power", beyond "this microscopic reality of countless reversible filaments, to establish secret and unbreakable bonds between people".

In turn, the writer, essayist and philosophy professor Miguel Real also talked about this passion of hope that is linked to Moisés de Lemos Martins' "communicational avant-garde", which, on the one hand, values the differences and diversity of peoples, and on the other hinders the necessary fight in defence of the Portuguese language as a language of cultures, thought and knowledge. He describes this journey as a "crossing", using the term that Moisés de Lemos Martins himself borrowed from the Brazilian writer and diplomat, João Guimarães Rosa – a crossing as an uncertain, risky and dangerous journey. The "crossing" to which Moisés de Lemos Martins refers is a journey of "technological circumnavigation", carried out through Portuguese-speaking countries and their diasporas. In a post-colonial context, Moisés de Lemos Martins reviews colonisation, taking into account the weight that it has today, with regard to the narratives, social memory and identities of Portuguese-speaking peoples, rereading the figure of "circumnavigation", which Stéphane Hugon used to characterise the journey that we are now all simultaneously invited to make – an online circumnavigation.

=== Towards a cybercultural circumnavigation ===
The figure of "technological circumnavigation", proposed by Moisés de Lemos Martins, convening all Portuguese-speaking peoples to embark upon this journey, in effect is also open to new landscapes, including websites, portals, blogs, digital repositories, virtual museums. It is a culture in a nascendi status, as he points out in a study he conducted with Michel Maffesoli – a culture that encompasses new atmospheres, which materialise the practices of professionals in the new digital context, in particular web designers, online curators, managers of virtual museums, bloggers, web activists, YouTubers.

The approach pursued by Moisés de Lemos Martins in relation to "image environments, between the artistic and the media", an expression by Norval Baitello which he used as a subtitle in A Carta, o Abismo e o Beijo (The Letter, the Abyss and the Kiss), brings him closer to this Communication theorist. Baitello classifies him as one of his "current interlocutors" and cites two of his works: Crise no Castelo da Cultura (2011/2017) and Do Post ao Postal (From the Post to the Postcard) (2014).

On the other hand, Moisés de Lemos Martins, considers that the formation of new audiences for cultures and the arts are also central to this idea of cyberculture circumnavigation, as well as specific policies for digital repositories, which always aim to foster open access to knowledge. However, this is a journey enmeshed in dangers and misunderstandings, including misunderstandings about the exceptionality of Portuguese colonisation, as well as nostalgia for the empire. Given that the technological circumnavigation of Portuguese-speaking peoples is always a " crossing", it is also presented as a place of promise – the promise that these peoples can have a voice and that they can speak, based on their subordination as countries in the semi-periphery of the global system.

=== Lusophony and intercultural communication ===
The Portuguese journalist and art critic, Alexandre Pomar, considers Moisés de Lemos Martins' work, "Lusofonia e Luso-tropicalismo: equívocos e possibilidades de dois conceitos hiper-identitários" (Lusophony and Luso-tropicalism: misunderstandings and possibilities of two hyper-identity concepts), to be "the most interesting approach to questions of an identity and mythology around the concept and strategic scope of Lusophony". He highlights the fact that Moisés de Lemos Martins makes "an analysis that proposes to think about Lusophony as a 'culture space' and questions the "mythological, symbolic and imaginary character" of 'Lusophone culture', starting by placing himself in a "Bourdieusian point of view", from which he "sees the figure of Lusophony as a practical classification, i.e. as a division of the social world. Alexandre Pomar wrote in January 2013 that as a practical classification, Lusophony is subordinated to practical functions and oriented towards the production of social effects". But even then he was able to conclude that "although less widely known than the academic production from the universities of Lisbon, the research into the concept and practices of Lusophony seems to be more fruitful in the University of Minho".

However, Moisés de Lemos Martins recognises that mistakes have been made in the use of the figure of Lusophony. Carlos Reis, Full Professor of Literature, at the University of Coimbra, recognised that "it is possible and perhaps even wise to speak about a risk with an eventual Eurocentric marking", and invited Moisés de Lemos Martins, in this regard, and resumed his warning that the dream of Lusophony for the Portuguese can fill "a space of imaginary refuge, the space of an imperial nostalgia, which helps them today to feel less alone and more visible in the seven matches of the world, now that the cycle of the country's effective imperial epic is definitively closed.".

Lusofonia e interculturalidade (2015)
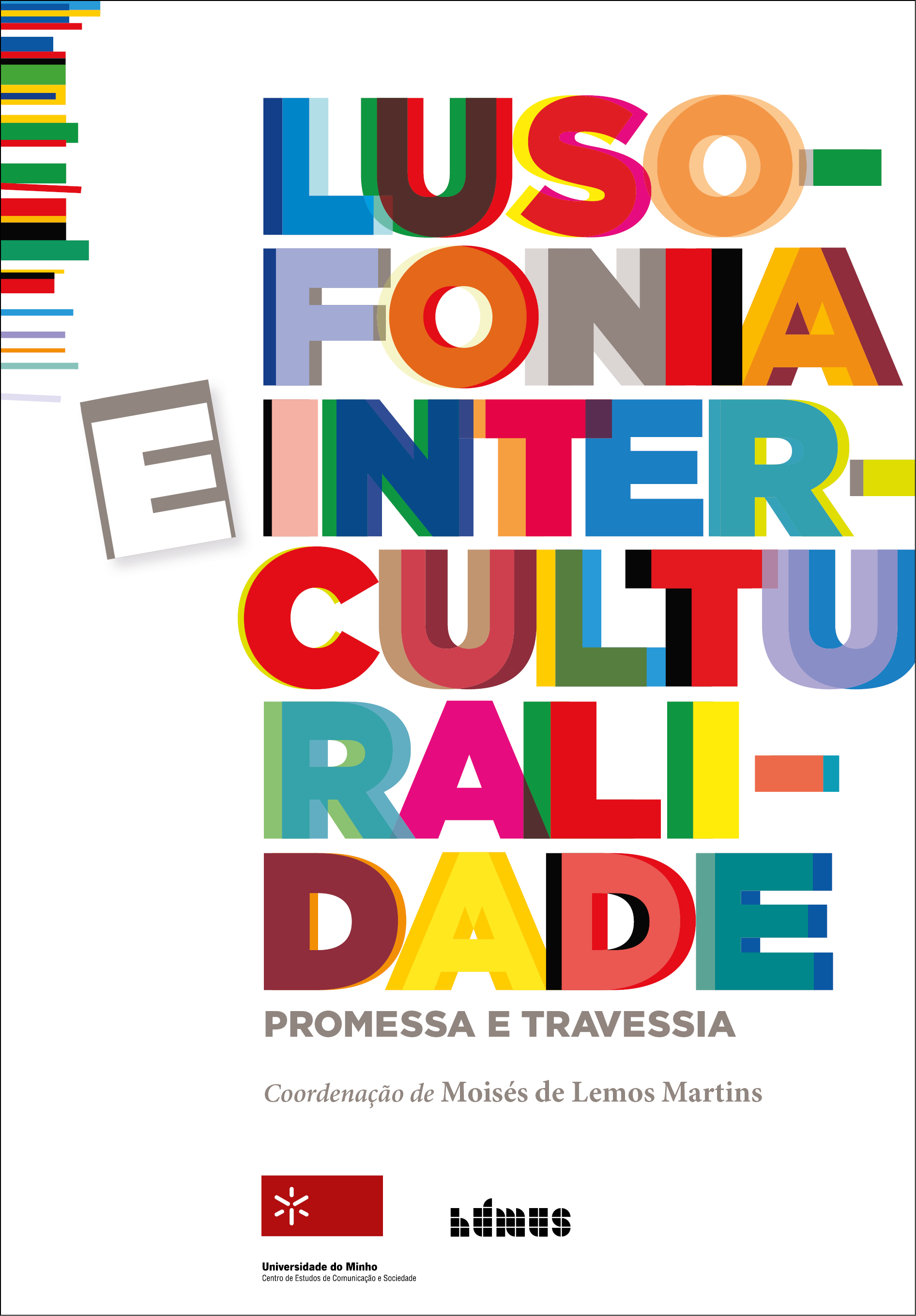
- 9789897551802-Lusofonia&Interculturalidade

Notes
- Húmus Editor

It is above all because of this line of research, developed in the field of intercultural communication, which focuses on transcultural and transnational identities, and particularly in the Portuguese-speaking identity, that led the Brazilian researcher Sónia Cunha to state that "Moisés Adão de Lemos Martins is a living part of contemporary historical memory, in the structuring and development of the intercultural scientific movement – Lusophony, Afro, Asian, Galician, Brazilian and Ibero-American – in the opposite direction of the north-south axis, in the field of communication". Anabela Gradim, Paulo Serra and Valeriano Pinheiro-Naval, researchers from the University of Beira Interior, when analysing "The presence of Lusophony in the epistemic space of Communication Sciences", in a decade of thematic studies (2007–2017), also concluded that the CECS – Communication and Society Research Centre, of the University of Minho, has an undisputed centrality "for Lusophone Studies in the field of Communication Sciences". This conclusion is also reached when looking at the list of the "most productive authors" in the field of Lusophony studies in the epistemic space of Communication – that all pertain to Moisés de Lemos Martins' team, primarily PhD or post-doctoral students whose theses he supervised.

=== The Virtual Museum of Lusophony ===
It was the idea of Lusophony as a "culture space" and "Lusophone culture" that inspired Moisés de Lemos Martins to create the Virtual Museum of Lusophony in 2017, as a web museum and a living museum, a transcultural and transnational space, open to active participation by citizens. In 2020, the Virtual Museum of Lusophony was installed on the Google Arts & Culture platform. Augusto Santos Silva, Portugal's Minister of Foreign Affairs, who attended the Museum's launch session on this platform stated that "instruments such as this one are very important, both as a dynamic product and as a process, since they foster cooperation at an academic level, between universities, and also involve digital companies, companies operating in the cultural area, individual or collective participants from civil society, and above all explore issues related to the Portuguese language". As Moisés de Lemos Martins pointed out to journalist Luís Caetano, on February 8, 2019, in the programme, "No Interior da Cultura", of Antena 2 of RDP, the Virtual Museum of Lusophony proposes to disseminate artistic and cultural materials from the Portuguese-speaking countries, its diasporas, and from regions such as Galicia, Goa and Macau. Aiming to contribute to "knowledge of the other", it serves to foster "reconciliation between nations and tolerance". On the other hand, it expresses the diversity of cultures in this space and shapes the collective memory of these communities and their plural identity. The Virtual Museum of Lusophony also aims to develop dynamics of interaction and cooperation, cultural, artistic, civic and scientific, in the vast Portuguese-speaking space, without forgetting the importance of the colonial past in the gestation of the contemporary realities of the Portuguese-speaking countries.

The idea of developing cooperation dynamics within the space of Portuguese-speaking communities was confirmed by the university professor and researcher Carlos Alberto Carvalho, in an interview he conducted with Moisés de Lemos Martins, in 2019, published in MATRIZes, a magazine of the Postgraduate Programme in Communication Sciences at the University of São Paulo. This Brazilian academic considers that "throughout his entire life, professor [Moisés de Lemos Martins] has fought for a concerted strategy of scientific cooperation between the Portuguese-speaking countries, inspired by a critical and post-colonial vision of Lusophony, which respects the differences and autonomy of all the countries and fosters mutual understanding between the peoples and nations of the space that shares the Portuguese language as a common symbolic heritage, thereby contributing to making Portuguese a language of science".

In RTP Play's programme, Palavra aos Directores, episode 12, broadcast on September 23, 2020, after installation of the Virtual Museum of Lusophony on Google Arts & Culture, Moisés de Lemos Martins underlined that the Virtual Museum is "an instrument of mediation for Portuguese-speaking citizens", which encourages the "exchange of cultural diversity and the exchange of artistic diversity".

=== The University and thought ===
Moisés de Lemos Martins raises his most radical line of enquiry in relation to thinking and institution that has been created in the West to preserve and promote it – the university. He wrote: "For a long time, the University in Portugal, where the main research laboratories are located, has ceased to harbour thought, and instead only understands numbers. Managed as a company, the University is now being driven by technology, to the point where it now seems that the only world of academic performance is that of market needs, financial injunctions, rankings of media visibility and respectability, and also rating agencies, which establish the criterion that values scientific production". The importance of the book has now been surpassed by the importance of articles published in scientific journals. And yet, in Moisés de Lemos Martins' opinion the book is the main means available to the Human and Social Sciences to explore ideas related to what it means to be human, ensuring that science is an idea with memory and thought.

But Moisés de Lemos Martins' defence of the importance of thought is not restricted solely to his academic work. He has also pursued this line of enquiry in the public space, in regular chronicles, which he publishes in the press. This activity was underlined by Carlos Fiolhais, physicist and full professor at the University of Coimbra, director of the university's research centre, Rómulo – Centro Ciência Viva, and author and principal editor of the blog De Rerum Natura dedicated to scientific policy, who said that he became acquainted with Moisés de Lemos Martins "through his powerful incisive articles", written in the press against the scientific policies that harmed the "human and social sciences". Specifically in reference to the book Crise no Castelo da Cultura, Carlos Fiolhais stated that Moisés de Lemos Martins "resolutely addresses the current state of the University, not only in Portugal but worldwide. In the section entitled 'University in the corruption of news' he states that universities, which should be the place for reflection, which requires time, have become marketing sites, that aim to achieve media visibility at all costs simply to survive or even to increase their 'business'. Classes have begun to imitate advertising. Everything has started to be quantified as if it were a business plan, where professors and researchers are 'human resources'".

=== Portugal and the "eye of God" of Salazar ===
There are other lines of research stand out in the extensive intellectual career of this university professor of the University of Minho before Moisés de Lemos Martins established a critical relationship with the contemporary academic world, a relationship that justifies, in the words of Eduardo Prado Coelho, "ruthless dismantling of the bear hug of liberal reason", or, according to the writer and university professor José Manuel Mendes, denunciation of the "poisoning of the gaze in the human sciences", One is analysis of the dominant discourse that prevailed in Portugal during the Estado Novo regime. One of his most notable achievements is the work, O Olho de Deus no Discurso Salazarista (The Eye of God in the Salazarian Discourse), that he published in 1990 (2nd edition in 2016). Based on reformulation of his PhD thesis, the work focuses on the 1930s and 1940s. Moisés de Lemos Martins questions the general politics of Salazarian meaning, i.e. the regime of truth. It was precisely because he posed the question of Salazar's regime of truth that he viewed discourse as a disciplinary political practice, exercised on historical memory, the gaze, desire and the will. In O Olho de Deus no Discurso Salazarista, Moisés de Lemos Martins provides a socio-semiotic analysis of Salazar's speeches, questioning the longevity of the corporate, political regime that the dictator founded. Starting from the idea that corporate, authoritarian and clerical ideology, as well as antidemocratic practices were not, by themselves, a sufficient explanation for Salazarism, Moisés de Lemos Martins decided to analyse the "Salazarist imaginary", that is, "the dream that Salazarism had for Portugal".

O olho de Deus no discurso Salazarista (2016)
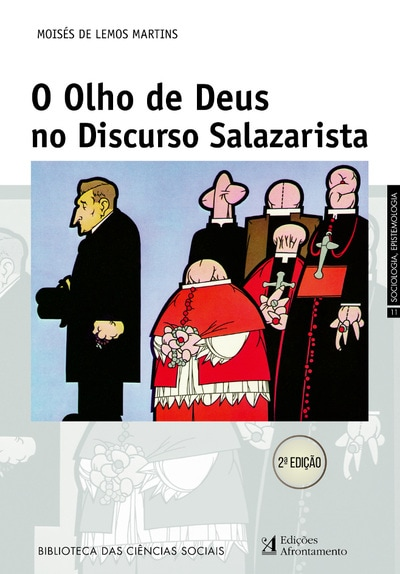
- Oolhodedeusno-discurso-salazarista-9789723615074

Notes
- Afrontamento Editions

The point of view adopted in O Olho de Deus no Discurso Salazarista is, above all, that of power, or more properly that of biopower, in line with the thinking of Michel Foucault, a panoptic and disciplinary power, which is exercised over bodies as living organisms. However, as José Augusto Mourão, Dominican friar, writer and University Professor of Literature and Communication points out, rereading the work of Moisés de Lemos Martins, Foucault's definition of power "is not limited to watching, spying, surprising, prohibiting and punishing, but incites, arouses and produces; it's not just the eye and ear; it makes people act and speak". While recognising "the shadow of Foucault" in O Olho de Deus no Discurso Salazarista, José Augusto Mourão concluded that this book is "a unique work in the panorama of Portuguese history and sociology". Summarising the path taken by Moisés de Lemos Martins up until that date, José Augusto Mourão states: "the author has chosen social Catholicism and the corporatist Estado Novo regime as the object of his analysis, in the period between May 28, 1926 and 1940. The methodology is clearly defined and there is no misunderstanding about the distance it maintains, either with the historical perspective or with the dialectical perspective. His field of work is that of the Salazarist discourse, dividing the text into three parts: the first, theoretical, which exposes religion as a panoptic view of society; a second, still with a strong theoretical bias, on the value systems or devices of Salazarist standardisation, which contemplates the ethical, eugenic and alethic apparatus; and a third part, on the application of the regime's strategy to heal the nation, through technologies aimed to discipline the national body, illustrated here by the figures of healing and conversion through parables".

As Moisés de Lemos Martins himself pointed out in his preface to the 2nd edition of the book, "feeding countless journeys of knowledge, The Eye of God in the Salazarist Discourse has come into contact, over the past twenty-five years, with many different ways of looking. Journeys of knowledge are, however, never-ending journeys. Today, reading or rereading this book on Salazarism continues to be a work of knowledge, although it is already another experience".

=== Semiotics as a human and social science and as a "problematological science" ===
Referring to Crime e Castigo – Práticas e Discursos (Crime and Punishment – Practices and Discourses), a book that Moisés de Lemos Martins edited in 2000 in which, in conjunction with other authors, he reflected on criminality in Portugal, the writer and university professor, José Manuel Mendes, praised the "problematological" point of view, which characterises his science, a point of view that "above all raises questions, as many as you can put and with the maximum rigour you are able to establish". He points out: "hearing in the background the death knell that is fine-tuned by the so-called philosophies of totality (Adorno: "totality is untruth"), by the grand narratives, I am here citing Jan Patočka in a reticular assertion: "becoming is problematised and will remain that way forever".

In an in-depth analysis of A Linguagem, a Verdade e o Poder, José Augusto Mourão also succumbed to the power of the semiotics of Moisés de Lemos Martins, that is simultaneously social and problematological. José Augusto Mourão stated: Moisés de Lemos Martins' writing "shares something similar with the sociologist who does not disconnect language from truth and power. His stilus scribendi is not due to the spectacle of his self-satisfied monologue. Instead, it provokes thinking about the war of paradigms that is fuelled by the libido dominandi. I agree. It is necessary to maintain a conception that is neither merely rhetorical nor merely consensual. […] In semiotics, the relationship of forces and the relationship of meaning are inextricably linked. The shadow of Foucault is a powerful presence in this book: the discursive construction of knowledge involves the use of 'disciplinary technologies' or forms of interaction that are used to create bodies that reinforce the 'positive power' on which the social order depends. '[discourse] is what we fight for, the very power we seek to seize", writes Michel Foucault, which the author cites in relation to discourse".

A Linguagem, a Verdade e o Poder (2017)
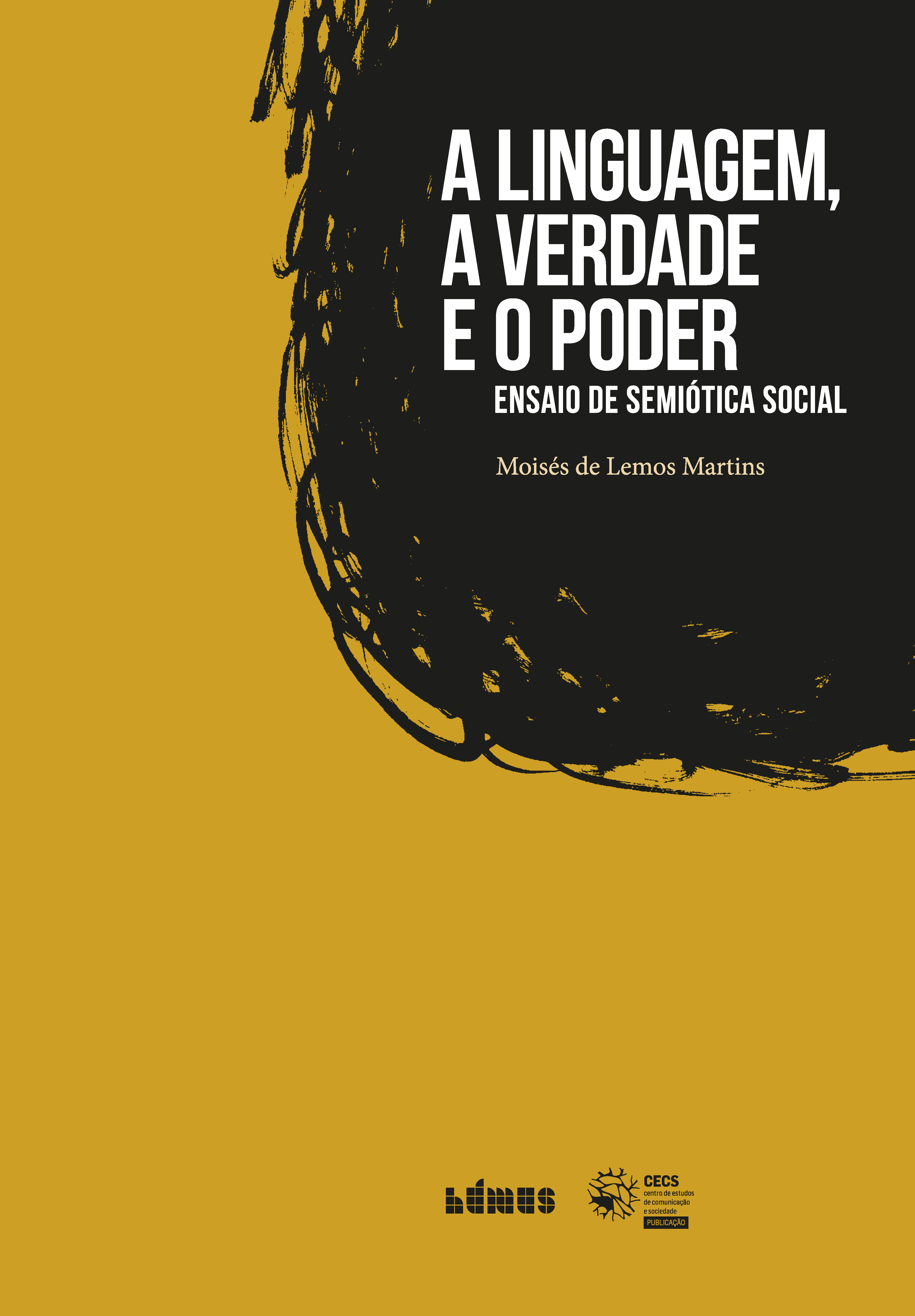
- 9789897552960-A Linguagem a verdade o poder

Notes
- Húmus Editor

It is, in fact, with A Linguagem, a Verdade e o Poder. Ensaio de Semiótica Social (2002/2017) that Moisés de Lemos Martins' Semiotic Theory asserts itself as social semiotics. Bernardo Pinto de Almeida, Full Professor at the Faculty of fine arts of the University of Porto, points out that "the author outlines a critical history of semiotics, questioning its concept and limits, its relevance and validity in the sociological approach that he never strays from". He also adds that in the writing of Moisés de Lemos Martins one feels "the experience of the accustomed professor and the restless thinker who does not bow down to concepts and discourses, but rather questions them in the light of his own ability to incarnate them in a living thought". On the other hand, his training as a sociologist "pervades the entire volume, under the rigorous applications that he develops in this attempt to semiotise sociology and sociologise the semiotics from which his entire enterprise emerges". In summary, Bernardo Pinto de Almeida concludes that it is this effort, "with its open character of transdisciplinarity, that gives the volume a particular strength and vivacity, making certain aspects of contemporaneity legible, in particular some of the paradoxes that underlie the formation of so-called 'post-modernity'".

Viewing semiotics as a social theory of the production of meaning, Moisés de Lemos Martins distances it from theories of consciousness and subjectivity, because meaning is not centred on the individual. Nor is it centred on the message that circulates between a sender and a receiver, as is the case of information theory. In the idea of semiotics that he proposes, Moisés de Lemos Martins is inspired by the transcendental conditions of the possibility of meaning and communication, which constitute the central axis of the theories, of Francis Jacques, on the one hand, and of Karl-Otto Apel and Jürgen Habermas, on the other. In so doing, Moisés de Lemos Martins opens signification to intersubjectivity and interaction, i.e. to communicative action. Starting from the a priori conditions of meaning, of Kantian inspiration, both Francis Jacques, com o with the primum relationis, and Karl-Otto Apel and Jürgen Habermas, with the "ethics of communicative action", had established the transcendental conditions of communication. Moisés de Lemos Martins' perspective in semiotics consists, however, in inverting the transcendental conditions of the possibility of meaning and communication, in conditions of the historical and social possibility of production of meaning. In all three cases – Jacques, Apel and Habermas – the primacy of the interlocutive relationship prevails, which is a relationship of communication. But in Moisés de Lemos Martins, the transcendental relationship, which underpins the dialogism of the three philosophers, becomes a socio-historical relationship, which is why his understanding of semiotics is social. This conclusion is reiterated by António Fidalgo, full professor of semiotics, at the University of Beira Interior: "the indication of its object is a very important element for its understanding as a science. Traditionally, semiotics was understood as the science of signs, but today new schools are appearing and authors are defending semiotics as a science of meaning as opposed to semiotics as a science of signs. One of these authors is Moisés Martins". And the reason why Moisés de Lemos Martins proposes a semiotics of discourse, rather than a semiotics of the sign, is that both the logic of communication and the theory of information, which constitute the dual tradition of the semiotics of the sign, have both ended up being mobilised at the service of the all-powerful technological, cybernetic and cyberspatial system for the circulation of verbal, sound and visual messages. There is, in fact, no doubt about the operative capacity of signs, given the fact that they bring together the logic of communication and the theory of information in the sense of their technological mobilisation.

=== A "Distinguished Portuguese citizen" ===
Moisés de Lemos Martins was interviewed, on February 6, 2014, for Fernando Alves' programme, "Portugueses excelentíssimos" (Distinguished Portuguese citizens), on TSF Rádio Notícias. The journalist who has interviewed dozens of illustrious Portuguese citizens for this programme introduced his guest as follows: "there are already many places where this man [Moisés de Lemos Martins] has left his footprint and the marks of his restless and disturbing knowledge, which justify his presence in this gallery of distinguished Portuguese Citizens".

A Romaria da Srª da Agonia (the Pilgrimage of Our Lady of Agony) (2000)
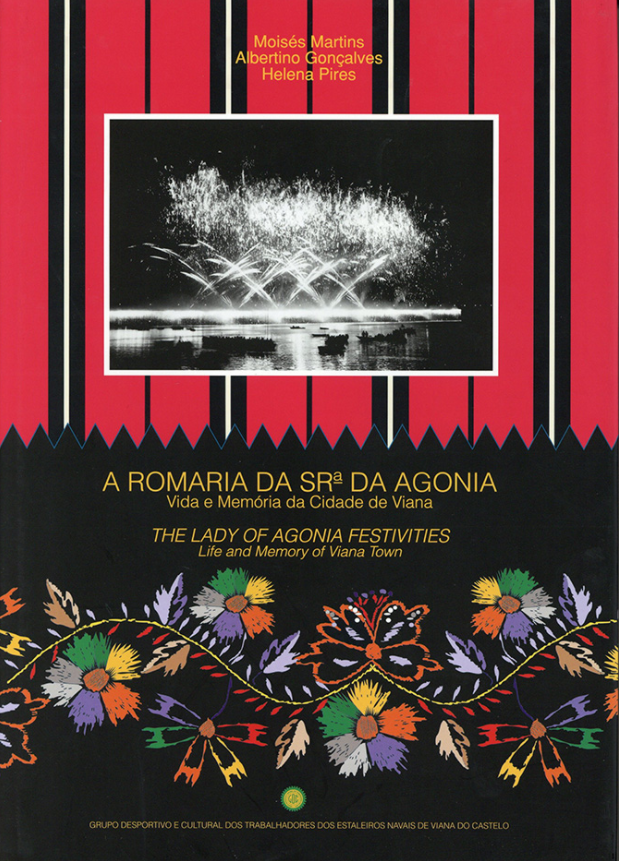

Notes
- Editor GDCTEN de Viana do Castelo

== List of Works (selection) ==
- A Internacionalização das comunidades lusófonas e ibero-americanas de Ciências Sociais e Humanas. O Caso das Ciências da Comunicação (The Internationalisation of the Lusophone and Ibero-American Communities of Human and Social Sciences. The case of the Communications Sciences). Famalicão, Húmus, 2017. Available at http://hdl.handle.net/1822/49365

A Internacionalização das Comunidades Lusófonas e Ibero-Americanas de Ciências Sociais e Humanas (The Internationalization of the Lusophone and Ibero-American Communities of Human and Social Sciences) (2017)
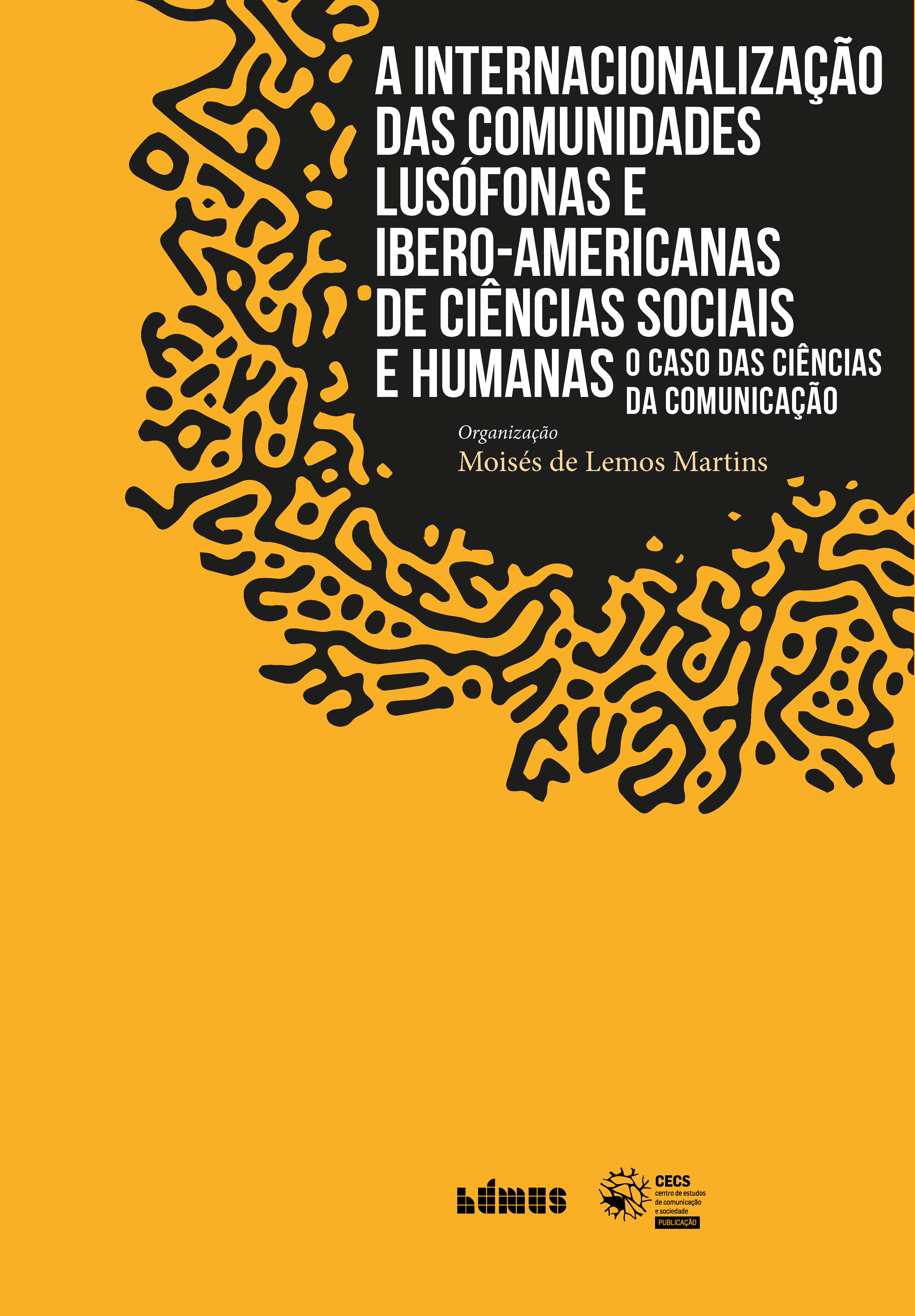
- 9789897553066-aInternacionalizacaoDasComunidades

Notes
- Editor Húmus

- A Lusofonia e an interculturalidade – Promessa e travessia (Lusophony and interculturality – Promise and crossing). Famalicão, Húmus, 2015. Available at http://hdl.handle.net/1822/39693
- Crise no Castelo da Cultura. Das Estrelas para os Ecrãs (Crisis in the Castle of Culture. From the Stars to the Screens). Coimbra: Grácio Editor, 2011 (2nd edition Húmus, 2017; Brazilian edition: Anneblume, 2011). Available at http://hdl.handle.net/1822/29167
- A Linguagem, a Verdade e o Poder. Ensaio de Semiótica Social (Language, Truth and Power. An Essay of Social Semiotics). Lisbon: Calouste Gulbenkian Foundation and the Foundation for Science and Technology (FCT), 2002 (2nd edition, Húmus, 2017). Available at http://hdl.handle.net/1822/48230.
- Ensino Superior e Melancolia. Oração de Sapiência (Higher Education and Melancholy. Prayer of Wisdom). Instituto Politécnico de Viana do Castelo, 2002. Available at http://hdl.handle.net/1822/1288
- Caminhos nas Ciências Sociais: memória, mudança social e razão. Estudos em homenagem a Manuel da Silva Costa (Paths in the Social Sciences: memory, social change and reason. Studies in honour of Manuel da Silva Costa). Coimbra: Grácio, 2010. Available at http://hdl.handle.net/1822/29762
- Para uma inversa navegação – O discurso da identidade (Towards an inverse navigation – The discourse of identity). Porto, Afrontamento, 1996.
- O olho de Deus no discurso salazarista (The eye of God in the Salazarist discourse), Porto, Afrontamento, 1990 (2nd edition 2016). Available at http://hdl.handle.net/1822/49972
- Políticas da Língua, da Comunicação e da Cultura no espaço Lusófono (Language, Communication and Culture Policies in the Lusophone space) (M. L. Martins & I. Macedo). Famalicão, Húmus, 2019. Available at http://hdl.handle.net/1822/62825
- Sentidos da Morte na vida da mídia (Meanings of Death in the life of the media). (M. L. Martins; M. Correia, P. Vaz & E. Antunes). Curitiba, Appris Editora, 2017.
- Do Post ao Postal (From the post to the postcard) (M. L. Martins & M. L. Correia). Famalicão, Húmus, 2014. Available at licão, Húmus, 2014. Available at http://hdl.handle.net/1822/35295
- L'Imaginaire des médias (The Imaginary of the Media) (M. Maffesoli & M. L. Martins). Sociétés, 2011/1 (nº111). Paris, De Boeck Université. ISSN:0765-3697
- Imagem e pensamento (Image and Thought) (M. L. Martins, José Bragança de Miranda, M. Oliveira e J. Godinho). Coimbra, Grácio Editor, 2011 (2nd edition Húmus, 2017). Available at hdl:1822/29165
- Comunicação e Lusofonia. Para uma abordagem crítica da cultura e dos média no espaço lusófono (Communication and Lusophony. Towards a critical approach to culture and media in the Portuguese-speaking space) (M. L. Martins, H. Sousa e R. Cabecinhas). Porto, Campo das Letras, 2006 (Húmus, 2017). Available at http://hdl.handle.net/1822/30019
- A Romaria da Sr.ª da Agonia. Vida e Memória da Cidade de Viana. The Lady of Agonia Festivities. Life and Memory of the city of Viana. (M. L. Martins, A. Gonçalves e H. Pires). Viana do Castelo, Grupo Cultural dos Trabalhadores dos Estaleiros Navais de Viana do Castelo, 2000.

The # 111 issue of the Journal of social sciences Sociétés edited by Michel Maffesoli & Moisés de Lemos Martins explores the contemporary imaginary of the media through various facets (2011).
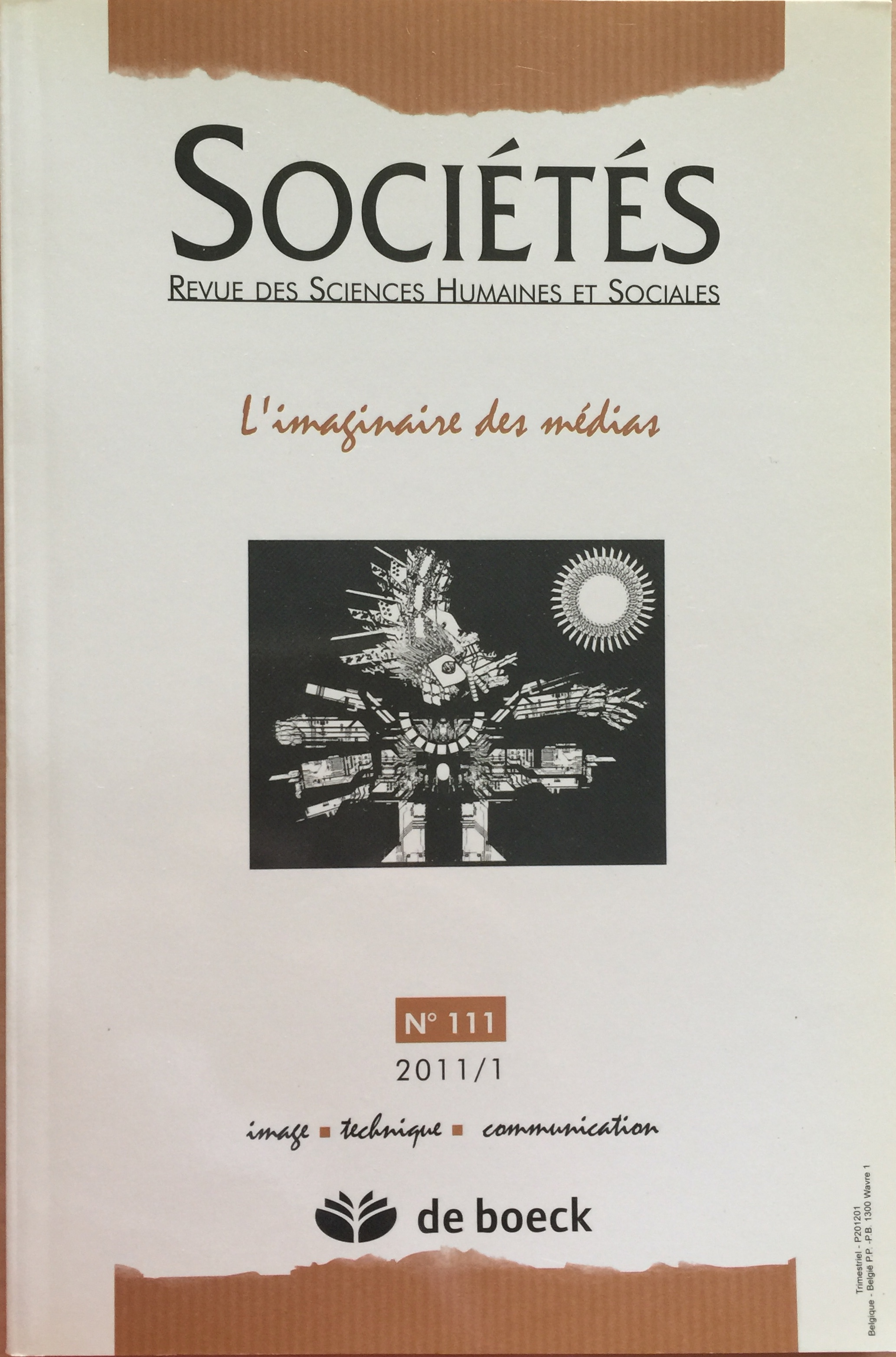
- L'imaginaire des médias – Revue Sociétés

Notes
- L'imaginaire des médias – Revue Sociétés

== Distinctions ==
- 2012 – Moisés Martins Tournament. Created in 2012, by former Communication Sciences students at the University of Minho, but currently involving both former and current students, as well as professors and employees, the Moisés Martins Tournament pays tribute to a particular way of being in the Academic world, seen as a space of freedom and a sense of community, a space with memory and thought, at the service of the preparation of new generations.
- 2015 – Honorary President of the Portuguese Association of Communication Sciences – Sopcom.
- 2015 – Academic distinction award by Intercom – Brazilian Society for Interdisciplinary Communication Studies.
- 2016 – Scientific Merit Award, from the University of Minho. Award aimed at distinction in research activity.
- 2021 – Gold Insignia, by the University of Santiago de Compostela.
