= Eduardo Coelho =

Eduardo Coelho may refer to:

- Eduardo Prado Coelho (1944–2007), Portuguese writer, journalist, columnist and professor
- Eduardo Teixeira Coelho (1919–2005), Portuguese comic book artist
