= Lúrio University =

Coordinates: 15.11675°S 39.20816°E

- Universidade Lúrio
- Motto: Latin: Scientia, Cretum, Fides; Portuguese: Ciência, Desenvolvimento, Compromisso
- Motto in English: Science, Development, Commitment
- Type: Public
- Established: 26 December 2006; 19 years ago
- Rector: Francisco Pedro Noa
- Vice Rectors: Sônia Maria Ataíde Maciel; Marcelino Liphola
- Academic staff: 192 (2013)
- Students: 1,430 (2013)
- Location: Marrere, Nampula Province, Mozambique
- Campus: Nampula Pemba Niassa Province
- Language: Portuguese
- Colours: Blue
- Website: www.unilurio.ac.mz

Lúrio University (Portuguese: Universidade Lúrio), also known as UniLúrio, is a public university in Nampula Province, Mozambique. Established by decree on 26 December 2006, the university has since grown to comprise seven faculties. Lúrio offers degree programs in 21 disciplines, enrolling 1,430 total students, including both undergraduate and postgraduate students. Besides its main campus in Nampula, the university operates campuses in Pemba, Cabo Delgado Province, and Niassa Province. The university is named for the Lúrio River in northeastern Mozambique.

== History ==
Enrollment by year
Year	Pop.	±%
2008	254	—
2013	1,430	+463.0%

Lúrio University was established by decree No. 50/2006 of the Council of Ministers on 26 December 2006, published in the Boletim da República, and officially inaugurated on 29 June 2007 by President Armando Guebuza. Education Minister Aires Ali, among others, attended the inauguration. In 2007, the university rectory was organized in Nampula, at first occupying facilities provided by the Museum of Ethnology of Mozambique. This made it the first public university in the country headquartered outside of the capital, Maputo. On 21 August 2007 the university council held its first session, defining its vision, mission, structure, and a suitable acronym. The Latin Scientia, Cretum, Fides ("Science, Development, Commitment") was chosen as the motto, and UniLúrio was selected as an acronym. The university logo was also chosen, selected from various designs put forward through a contest promoted by Eduardo Mondlane University's Faculty of Architecture and Physical Planning.

The university opened the Faculty of Health Sciences to students in 2007. The university started out with 20 instructors, 254 students, and three courses, medicine, dental medicine, and pharmacy. From the start, the university planned to eventually expand to three campuses. These goals came to fruition in 2008 and 2009, when satellite campuses were opened in Pemba, Cabo Delgado Province and Sanga, Niassa Province, respectively. The Pemba campus opened in temporary quarters in August 2008, and later moved onto a 12-hectare permanent campus. At the Pemba campus' opening, the Minister of Education said that Lúrio University "has positively surprised us, because without much uproar it is producing results."

By 2013, the university had 192 professors and 1,430 students. That year, the university reported it was planning to construct a 70-bed teaching hospital, and potentially an eye-hospital with Indian assistance. At that point, the university was using the Central Hospital of Nampula as its training hospital. During the rectorship of Jorge Ferrão, the university acquired significant debt.

=== Rectors ===
- Jorge Ferrão (c. 2013)
- Francisco Pedro Noa (c. 2017)
- Leda Florinda Hugo (c. 2020)

== Academics ==
Lúrio University comprises six faculties. The Faculty of Health Sciences offers degrees in medicine, dental medicine, pharmacy, nutrition, optometry, and nursing. The Faculty of Agrarian Sciences provides engineering degrees with specialties in forestry, rural development, and zootechnics. The Faculty of Engineering awards degrees in computer engineering, civil engineering, geological engineering, mechanical engineering. The Faculty of Natural Sciences offers a bachelor's program in biological sciences. The Faculty of Architecture and Physical Planning offers two degrees: architecture and physical planning, and urban planning and spatial planning. The Faculty of Social and Human Sciences awards a bachelor's degree in tourism and hospitality, and a degree in international relations and development. The Business School offers three degrees: economics, business management, and accounting, taxation, and auditing.

As of 2008, the university had 43 faculty, of which 46.5% were women, and a student-to-faculty ratio of 17:1. By 2013, the university had 192 faculty, and a student-to-faculty ratio of 7.4:1, one of the lowest in the country. Ten faculty members represent nationalities other than Mozambican. The university is aiming to reach 80% of its faculty having a master's degree or higher, and its ideal is to have 70% of the faculty with master's degrees and 30% with doctorates.

Lúrio University faculties
Faculty	Campus	Opened
Health Sciences	Nampula	2007
Engineering and Natural Sciences (Split in 2010)	Pemba	2008
Agrarian Sciences	Niassa	2009
Engineering	Pemba	2010
Natural Sciences	Pemba	2010
Architecture and Physical Planning	Nampula	2010
Social and Human Sciences	Nampula	?
Unilúrio Business School	Nampula	?

== Campuses ==
Lúrio University has three campuses in northern Mozambique. The main campus, opened in 2007, is located in Marrere, Nampula Province, near the city of Nampula. Its two satellite campuses, located in Pemba, Cabo Delgado Province and Sanga, Niassa Province, were opened in 2008 and 2009, respectively. Overall, throughout its three campuses, the university's academic spaces include 120 work spaces, 54 classrooms, and a number of laboratories. Each campus has a student dining room. There are 18 student dormitories at the Nampula campus, and four (plus 25 more planned) in Niassa. A 70-bed teaching hospital and an eye hospital are planned for the Nampula campus.

The Nampula campus contains the faculties of Health Sciences, Architecture and Physical Planning, Social and Human Sciences, and the School of Business. At the Pemba campus are located the faculties of Engineering and Natural Sciences. The Niassa campus consists of the Faculty of Agrarian Sciences. Although the Faculty of Social and Human Sciences is based out of the Nampula campus, it courses include time spent at the Island of Mozambique.

== Athletics ==
The university has some sports programs, including basketball, handball, and tennis. The university is looking to develop a football (soccer) team, and recently built a field and stands.

== See also ==
- List of universities in Mozambique
