= Institute of International Relations (Mozambique) =

International Colleges in Mozambique

- Latin: Institutum Relationum Internationalium
- Type: Higher Education Institution
- Established: 1986
- Location: Maputo, Mozambique

Institute of International Relations (Potugis: ISRI; Instituto Superior de Relações Internacionais ) is a higher education institution in Maputo, Mozambique, founded in 1986. This institution is dedicated to the fields of international relations, in diplomacy, politics and development.

== History ==
In 1991, ISRI realized one of its main objectives by establishing the Center for International Strategic Studies (CEEI), whose main task is to carry out scientific, academic and applied research functions.

In search of complementary elements and to grow as an HEI, and in response to public demand, in 2001, the HEI introduced a degree program in public administration and, in 2009, a master's program in international relations and development, with a specialization in external politics and in international trade or finance; a master's degree in public administration and development, with a specialization in territorial administration or public financial management.

Consequently, ISRI currently has 1,916 students enrolled in the courses, 856 in the work period and 940 in the post-work period, assisted by a teaching staff of 65 teachers, of which 1/3 have a PhD.

Given its Statutes, it was established by Decree no. 12/97 dated June 3, ISRI can grant honorary titles, such as professor emeritus and Doctor Honoris Causas to professors, scientists, in the fields of Science, Literature, Arts and Culture in general or those who have provided relevant services to humanity in the international world.

On April 29, 2016, ISCSP-ULisboa signed a cooperation protocol with the Higher Institute of International Relations (ISRI), at the ISRI facilities in Maputo (Mozambique). The partnership aims to promote cooperation between the two institutions to carry out academic, scientific, technical, pedagogical and cultural activities in areas of common interest. The protocol was signed by the president of ISCSP-ULisboa, Manuel Meirinho, and by the Vice-Rector of ISRI, Professor Doctor José Magode.

== See also ==
- List of universities in Mozambique
- List of universities in Africa
- List of universities and colleges by country
