= IIR =

IIR may refer to:

- Institute of International Relations (disambiguation)
- Institute for International Research, a human capital development company acquired by Informa
- International Institute of Refrigeration
- Imaging infrared, in munitions guidance systems
- Indo-Iranian languages
- Infinite impulse response
- Isobutylene isoprene rubber (butyl rubber)
