= Severino Elias Ngoenha =

Mozambican philosopher

Severino Elias Ngoenha (Maputo, 1962) is a Mozambican philosopher working in the area of Political philosophy. He is one of the main Portuguese-speaking African philosophers, along with other thinkers such as the Mozambican philosopher José Castiano, the Mozambican social theorist Elísio Macamo and the Angolan philosopher Filipe Cahungo.

== Biography ==
Ngoenha studied first at the Eduardo Mondlane University in Biology and Chemistry. He did not finish this studies, because of his growing interest in studying Theology or Religious Studies, specially Liberation Theology. So Ngoenha began to study Theology at Pius X Seminar (Seminário Pio X) at Maputo.

After these initial studies in Mozambique, he went to Rome in 1984, where he continued his studies at the Pontifical Gregorian University. At this educational institution he went on to study theology and philosophy. In Rome, Ngoenha began to take an interest in African philosophy, which lead him not only to disseminate these philosophical studies among his fellow countrymen in Mozambique, but also to develop his own philosophical perspectives.

In 1988 he goes to Paris, where he gets a doctorate in philosophy with a thesis on Voltaire in 1990. He then becomes a professor of philosophy at the University of Lausanne, Switzerland, where he raised a family there. During this period he became a visiting professor of philosophy at Eduardo Mondlane University.

In 2010, he joined the Department of Philosophy of the Pedagogical University of Mozambique (Universidade Pedagógica de Moçambique), now named Maputo University. Severino Ngoenha has been the Dean of the Technical University of Mozambique since January 2015.

Since September 2020, Ngoenha is president of the Council of Rectors of Mozambique.

== Philosophical work ==
Ngoenha defends two philosophical ideas: the freedom paradigm (paradigma liberdade or paradigma libertário) and the philosophy of federalism (filosofia do federalismo). These two ideas are articulated in a critical framework that interrogates the Marxism, socialism and liberal capitalism.

The idea of freedom paradigm (paradigma liberdade or paradigma libertário) was used by Severino Ngoenha for the first time in his book named Os tempos da filosofia (The times of Philosophy). In this book, it cited a specific African idea of freedom or will to freedom.

== Books ==
- Por uma Dimensão Moçambicana da Consciência Histórica. Porto: Edições Salesianas, 1992.
- Filosofia Africana: das independências as liberdades (1993)
- O retorno do bom selvagem : uma perspectiva filosófica-africana do problema ecológico. Porto : Ed. Salesianas, 1994.
- Os tempos da filosofia (2004)
- Pensamento Engajado - Ensaios sobre Filosofia Africana, Educação e Cultura Política (2011), com José Castiano
- Intercultura: alternativa a governação biopolítica. Maputo: Publifix, 2013.
- A Terceiro Questão (2015)
- A (Im)possibilidade do momento moçambicano: notas estéticas (2016)
- Resistir a Abadon (2017)
- Manifesto por uma terceira via. Maputo: Fundo Nacional de Investigação, 2019, com José Castiano.

== See also ==
- African philosophy
- Africana philosophy
