= Institute of International Relations Yekaterinburg =

Institute of International Relations
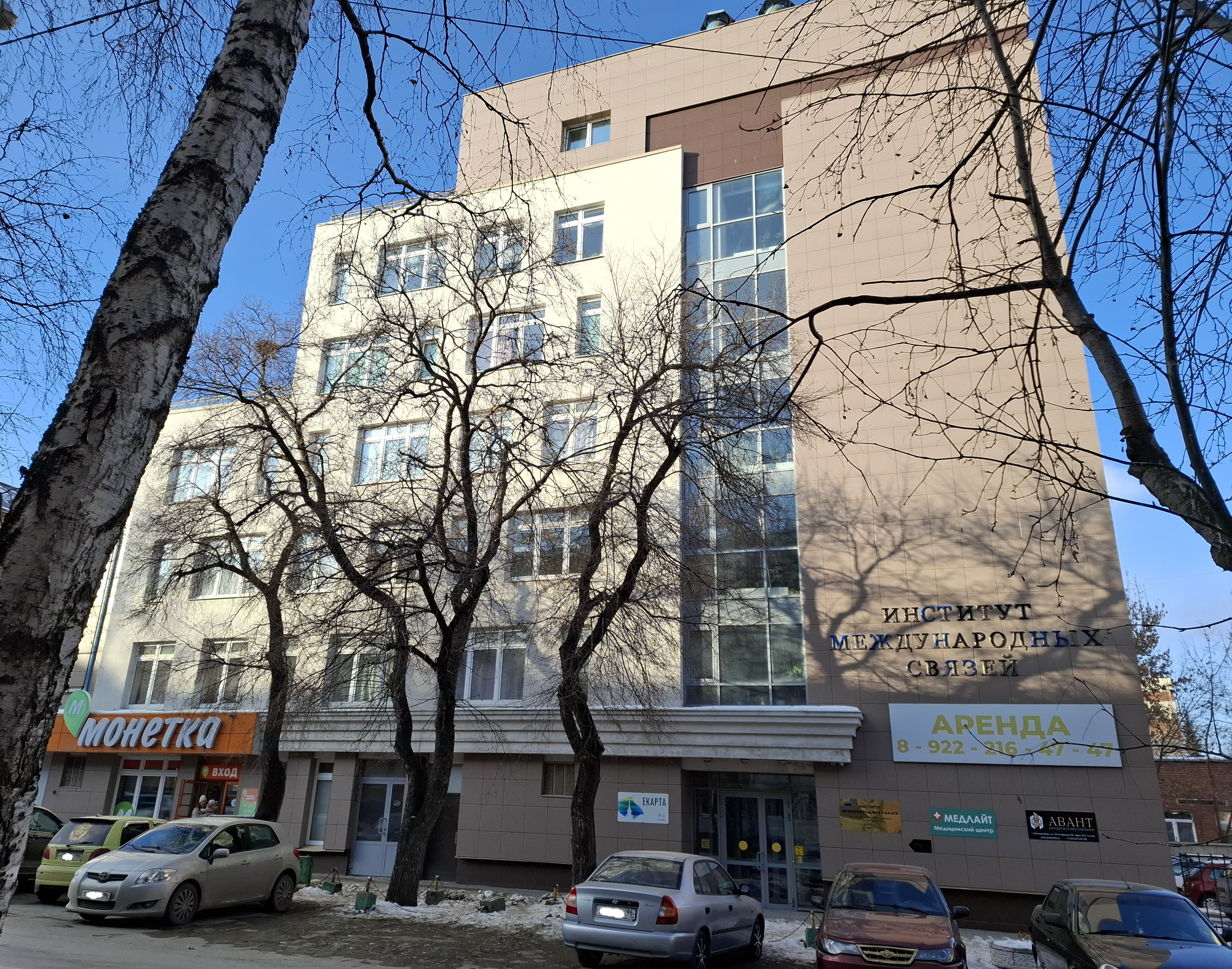
- Type: Private
- Established: 1994
- President: Kraev I.V.
- Undergraduates: 1,047
- Location: Yekaterinburg, Sverdlovsk region, Russia; 56.810945°N 60.607763°E
- Campus: Urban
- Colours: Blue
- Nickname: IMS
- Website: www.ims-ural.ru

Institute of International Relations (IIR, or IMS) is a private academic institution located in Yekaterinburg, Sverdlovsk Oblast, Russia. It has a state accreditation (Order of the Federal Service for Supervision in Education and Science from 20.03.2006). It is one of the oldest private higher education providers in Yekaterinburg, and was originally established as the Yekaterinburg College of Foreign Languages in 1994 by the Urals Architecture and Art Academy and private individuals. Formerly a liberal arts college, it has been preparing professional translators. The institute has been conferring specialist degrees since 1997.

Institute of International Relations has a branch in Kamensk-Uralsk and a College of the Institute of International Relations in Yekaterinburg. The college is a structural unit of IIR that implements programs of vocational education in management, tourism and hospitality. The Kamensk-Uralsk branch of IIR has provided professional education in linguistics and management since 1998.

The university operates three academic faculties: Linguistics, International Economy Relations, and Additional Education, with an enrollment of 1,047 undergraduate students. The teaching buildings are located on 10,151 m2 of land in the city centre of Yekaterinburg near Church of All Saints, on the shore of the pond on the River Iset.

The university is noted as strong in the fields of Linguistics. The institute holds a golden medal "One hundred best universities of Russia", awarded by Independent Public Council in St. Petersburg.

== History ==
Institute of International Relations was established in response to a great need for professionals with an excellent command of foreign languages and deep knowledge in the field of theory and practice of international culture and international relations in the Ural region. The regional government adopted a program of staffing of international activity, which IIR was an active participant.

Institute of International Relations was founded in 1994 as Ekaterinburg College of Foreign Languages. ECFL offered a limited number of courses in rented office space in 1994 and 1995 but opened officially, for full operation, in 1997 with the completion of the building on Ul. Rosa Luksemburg, 46. Ekaterinburg College of Foreign Languages was upgraded to a university and officially began operation as IIR on September 1, 1997.

In April 2016, the institute's government accreditation was cancelled.

== Rectors ==
The first rector was Tamara Alayba.

For 2024 rector is Vylegzhanina Irina Andreevna.
