= List of universities in Mozambique =

This is a list of colleges and universities in Mozambique:

| Name | Portuguese name | Location | Type | Opened | Ref. |
|---|---|---|---|---|---|
| Academy of Police Sciences | Academia de Ciências Policiais | Maputo | Public |
| Alberto Chipande Higher Institute of Sciences and Technology | Instituto Superior de Ciências e Tecnologia Alberto Chipande | Beira | Private |
| Catholic University of Mozambique | Universidade Católica de Moçambique | Eight campuses | Private | 1996 |
| Chókwè Agricultural School | Escola Agrária de Chókwè | Chókwè | | 1961 |
| Eduardo Mondlane University | Universidade Eduardo Mondlane | Maputo | Public | 1962 |
| HEFSIBA — Christian Higher Education Institute | HEFSIBA — Instituto Superior Cristão | Ulonguè | Private | 1994 |
| Higher Institute of Health Sciences | Instituto Superior de Ciências de Saúde | Maputo | Public | 2004 |
| Joaquim Chissano University | Universidade Joaquim Chissano | Maputo | Public | 1986 |
| Higher Institute of Sciences and Technology of Mozambique | Instituto Superior de Ciências e Tecnologias de Moçambique | Maputo | Private |
| Higher Institute of Transport and Communications | Instituto Superior de Transportes e Comunicações | Maputo | Private |
| Higher Polytechnic Institute of Gaza | Instituto Superior Politécnico de Gaza | Chókwè | Public | 2005 |
| Higher Polytechnic Institute of Manica | Instituto Superior Politécnico de Manica | Manica | Public | 2005 |
| Higher School of Economics and Management | Escola Superior de Economia e Gestão | Maputo | Private | 2005 |
| Higher School of Nautical Sciences | Escola Superior de Ciências Náuticas | Maputo | Public |
| Save University | Universidade Save | Chongoene | Public | 2006 |
| Jean Piaget University of Mozambique | Universidade Jean Piaget de Moçambique | Beira | Private |
| Lúrio University | Universidade Lúrio | Nampula | Public | 2006 |
| Mussa Bin Bique University | Universidade Mussa Bin Bique | Nampula | Private | c. 2010 |
| One World University | Instituto Superior de Educação e Tecnologia | Changalane Maputo | Private | 1998 |
| Maputo University | Universidade Maputo | Maputo | Public | 1985 |
| Polytechnic University | Universidade Politécnica | Maputo | Private | 1994 |
| St. Thomas University of Mozambique | Universidade São Tomás de Moçambique | Maputo | Private |
| Technical University of Mozambique | Universidade Técnica de Moçambique | Maputo | Private | 2003 |
| Zambeze University | Universidade Zambeze | Beira | Public | 2007 |
| Wutivi University | Universidade Wutivi | Maputo | Private | 2008 |

== See also ==
- List of medical schools in Africa
