= Technical University of Mozambique =

The Technical University of Mozambique (Portuguese: Universidade Técnica de Moçambique) is one of Mozambique's principal private universities. The name of the university is abbreviated to UDM. The UDM has its headquarters and main campus in Maputo.

== History ==
The Technical University of Mozambique (UDM) was founded in 2002, it having started its activities in 2003. The first dean or rector of UDM was Fernando dos Reis Ganhão.

List of rectors of UDM:

- Fernando dos Reis Ganhão (2002-2010);
- José Luis de Oliveira Cabaço (2010-2015);
- Severino Elias Ngoenha (2015-)

== Institutional structure and management ==
UDM currently has three faculties:

- Faculty of Social and Economics Sciences;
- Faculty of Juridical Sciences;
- Faculty of Technological Sciences.

Each faculty has a faculty staff with administration, academic affairs and development, human resources department and public relations department.
