= Institute of International Relations, KFU =

Kazan University institute, Tartarstan, Russia

- Институт международных отношений КФУ
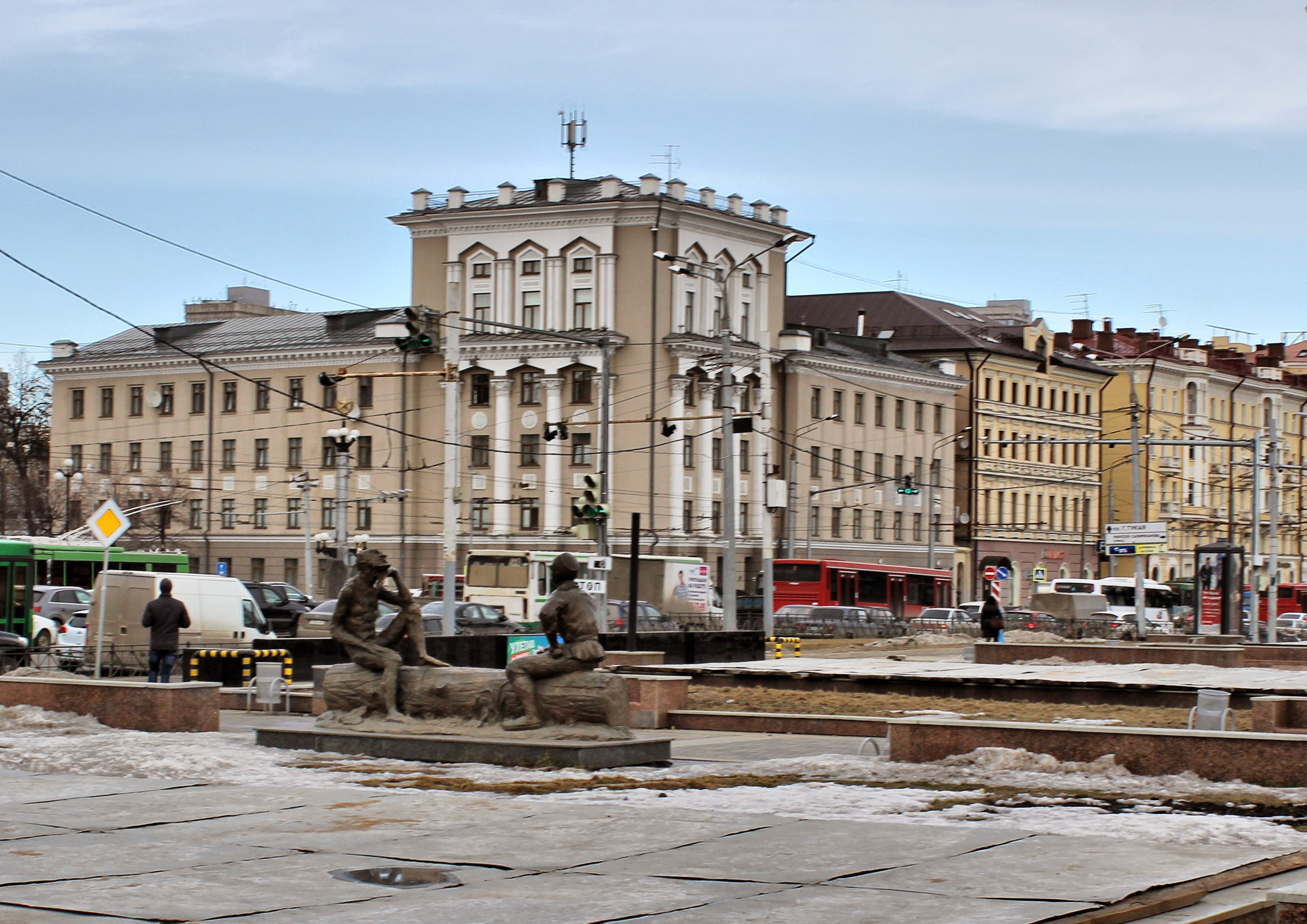
- Director: Ramil Khairutdinov
- Academic staff: 300
- Students: 5000
- Location: 1/55 Pushkina Street, office 312, Kazan, 420008, Kazan, Tatarstan, Russia
- Campus: Both urban and suburban
- Colours: Blue/Grey
- Website: Institute of International Relations, KFU

The Institute of International Relations is one of the institutes at Kazan (Volga Region) Federal University. Its history began with the founding of Kazan Imperial University in 1804. The institute was renamed on September 1, 2018. From 2013 it was called the Institute of International Relations, History and Oriental Studies.

The institute offers such academic degrees as bachelor's, master's and postgraduate. Conferences, short-term schools and competitions are regularly held for university students and schoolchildren. Some of the events have gained international fame, among which are the Korean Language Competition for University Students and Schoolchildren in Russia and the CIS countries and the Chinese Song Contest.

The Department of the Mongolian Language was established in 1833. It became the first institution in Europe and Russia where Mongolian studies were carried out. The first Chair of the Department was Józef Kowalewski. In 1837, the Department of the Chinese Language was founded at the Oriental Faculty, Kazan University. Since then Chinese Studies have been implemented in an academic setting. In the 1830s, the Center of Oriental Studies was formed at Kazan University. It worked here until 1854 when the faculty were transferred to Saint Petersburg Imperial University. The Silk Road is one of the main current research projects of the institute.

The scholars of the Institute of International Relations were involved in the work of various scientific centers and societies during the different periods of its existence: the Society for Archeology, History and Ethnography under Kazan Federal University, Confucius Institute at KFU, Korean Center, etc. The Institute of International Relations hosts numerous major scientific events, some of which have become traditional and gained international status, for example, the International Scientific Forum "Islam in a Multicultural World", the International Research and Practice Conference "China-Russia: History and Culture" and the International Archaeological School in the town of Bulgar. Research centres and laboratories of the Institute are also involved in the educational process (Confucius Institute, Restoration Laboratory, Korea Research Center, etc.)

== Outstanding Alumni and Mentors ==
A lot of well-known scholars of history, archeology, ethnology, Oriental Studies, and Regional Studies studied and worked in the Institute of International Relations at Kazan Federal University over all the years of its history.

● K. Fuchs, Doctor, botanist, ethnographer, historian, archaeologist and numismatist, professor and rector, Kazan Imperial University (1823–1827).

● H. Frahn, an outstanding Russian orientalist, Arabist, numismatist, professor, at Kazan University (1807–1815).

● A. Kazem-Bek (Mirza Kazym-Bek), an orientalist, professor, at Kazan University in 1826–1848.

● A. Shchapov, historian, publicist, writer, philosopher, professor, at Kazan University (1856–1861).
