= Eduardo Prado Coelho =

Portuguese academic, writer and journalist (1944–2007)

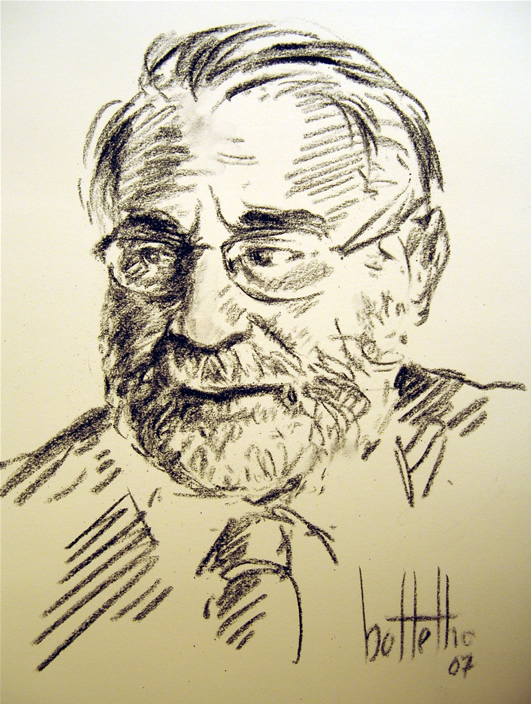
Portrait of Eduardo Prado Coelho

Eduardo Prado Coelho (29 March 1944 Lisbon - 25 August 2007 Lisbon, Portugal) was a Portuguese writer, journalist, columnist and university professor. He was also a political and cultural critic.

Coelho was born on 29 March 1944 in Lisbon, Portugal. He was the son of Jacinto do Prado Coelho, a Portuguese professor and literary critic. Eduardo Prado Coelho began teaching at the New University of Lisbon in 1983.

Coelho often contributed a column to magazines and newspapers. He contributed to the Público newspaper right up to his death in 2007.

He was awarded, in 2004, with the Prémio Arco-íris (Rainbow Award), of the Associação ILGA Portugal (Lesbian, Gay, Bisexual and Transgender Intervention Association Portugal), the Portuguese chapter of the International Lesbian, Gay, Bisexual, Trans and Intersex Association, for his contribution in the struggle against discrimination and homophobia.

Coelho also served as an adviser to the Belém Cultural Center.

Eduardo Prado Coelho died in Lisbon, Portugal on 25 August 2007, of cardiac problems.
