= Visual rhetoric and composition =

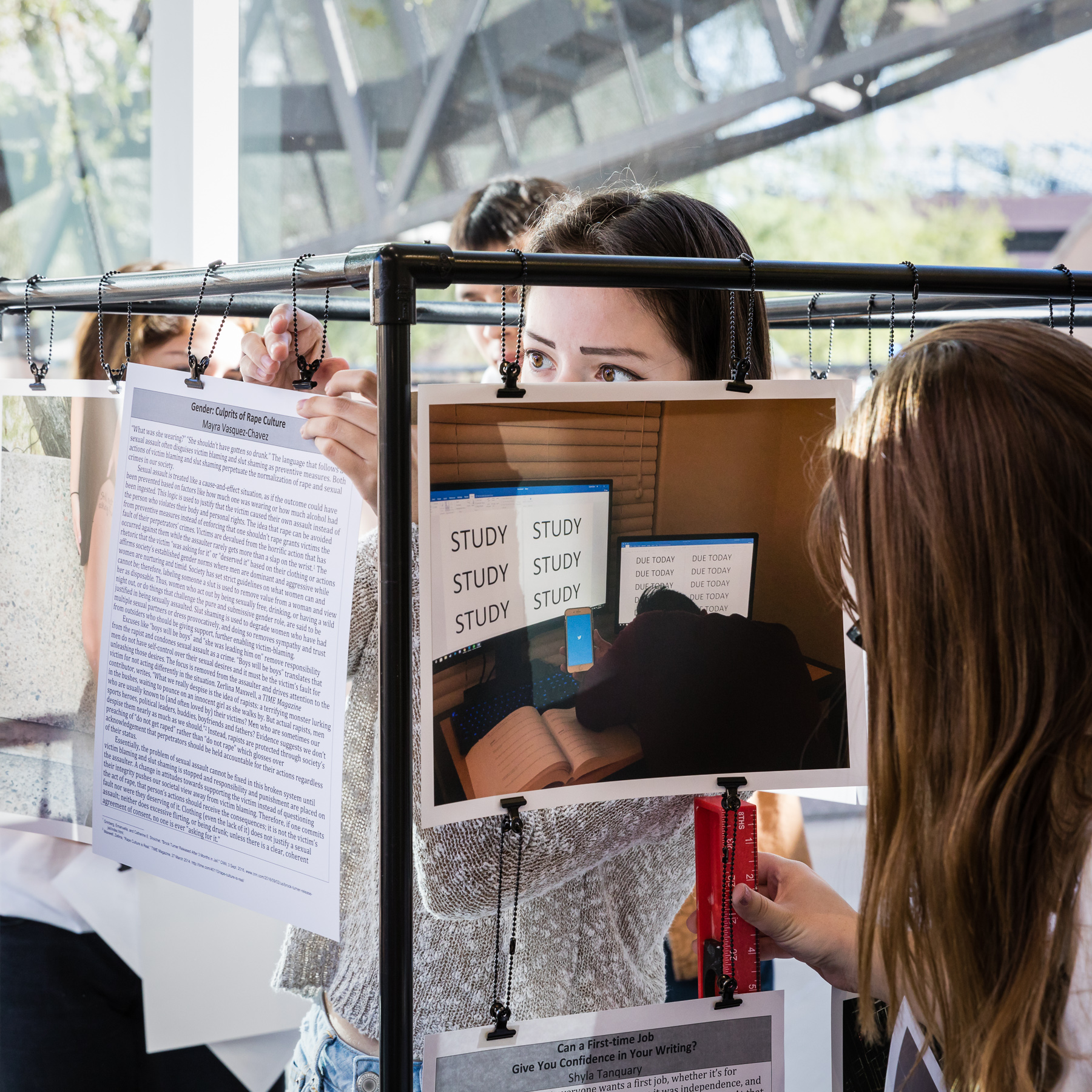
Students in writing, rhetoric, and literacy courses at the postsecondary level exhibit visual rhetoric and composition projects.

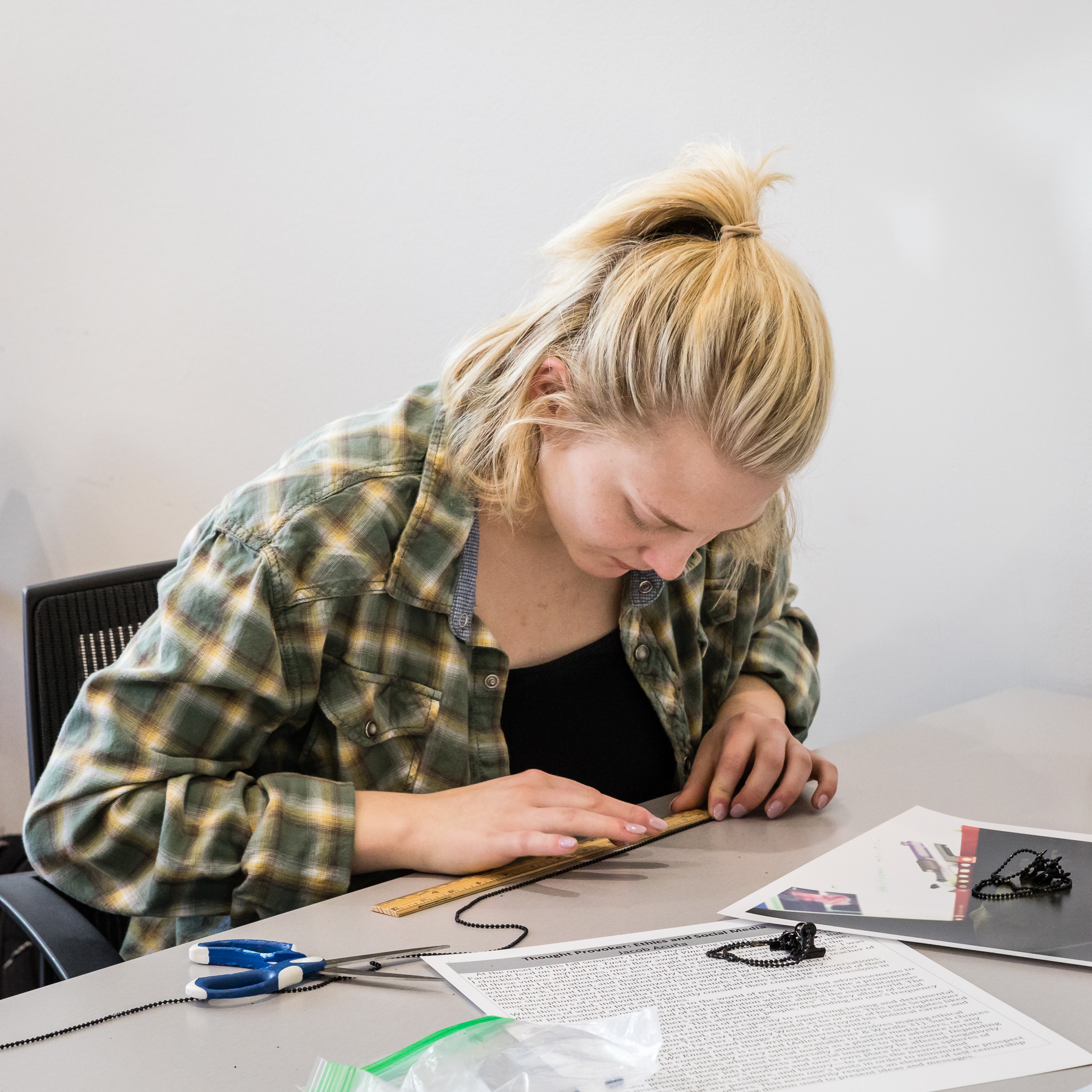
Selves in Systems: A Rhetorical Arts Installation

The study and practice of visual rhetoric took a more prominent role in the field of composition studies towards the end of the twentieth century and onward. Proponents of its inclusion in composition typically point to the increasingly visual nature of society, and the increasing presence of visual texts. Literacy, they argue, can no longer be limited only to written text and must also include an understanding of the visual.

Despite this focus on new media, the inclusion of visual rhetoric in composition studies is distinct from a media theory of composition, though the two are obviously related. Visual rhetoric focuses on the rhetorical nature of all visual texts while new media tends to focus on electronic mediums.

== Background ==
Visual rhetoric or “visual modes of representation” has been present in composition (college writing) courses for decades but only as a complementary component “for writing assignments and instructions” since it was considered as “a less sophisticated, less precise mode of conveying semiotic content than written language.” Nevertheless, many experts in composition studies, including Linda Flower and John R. Hayes, and Jason Palmeri, draw a parallel between “alphabetic writing and the visual arts” because both entail an engagement “in composing as a recursive process of discovery – a process in which composers [or in this context, students]…explore, transform, and rearrange materials (words, images, objects).”

The call to include non-linguistic practices within the field of rhetoric officially occurred in 1970 at the National Conference on Rhetoric. Some scholars opposed the inclusion of visual rhetorics arguing that it detracted from public discourse. Other scholars, such as Kenneth Burke and Douglas Ehninger, were proponents of including visual elements into the discipline of rhetoric. In 1994, the New London Group, consisting of ten scholars from Australia, Great Britain, and the United States, developed the term multiliteracies, which describes the rapid growth of communication channels and platforms through which people from all around the world design and exchanges various contents of information despite the differences in languages and cultures. In educational contexts, multiliteracies suggest “a different kind of pedagogy, one in which language and other modes of meaning are dynamic representational resources, constantly being remade by their users as they work to achieve their various cultural purposes." Thus, visual literacy or visual rhetoric specifically applies to Composition Studies through the study and focus on various forms of texts expressed in different mediums. Liza Long, Amy Minervini, and Joel Gladd define visual rhetoric as "the means by which visual imagery can be used to achieve a communication goal such as to influence people’s attitudes, opinions, and beliefs." The writer employs knowledge of function, form, and purpose to create the visual text; while the audience or reader constructs meaning from the parts as they contribute to the complete piece. Composition is a technology. From the beginning, the writer employed symbolic representation of images made with tools on a medium. With the advent of multimodal and digital texts incorporating visuals and traditional text, visual rhetoric has a home in Composition Studies. Notably, multimodal texts imply an “interconnection among other modes” such as audio, linguistic, visual, gestural, and spatial, whereas visual texts include “images, page layouts, screen formats,” etc.

== Elements of Visual Rhetoric ==
Elements of visual rhetoric can include: image, color, text, font, layout, alignment, accessibility, all of which may be analyzed to uncover meaning within any given rhetorical situation. Additionally, these elements may be considered in relation to rhetorical concepts related to purpose, audience, delivery, reception, context, and coherency.

== Teaching applications ==
Scholarship has highlighted that the way students compose and interpret texts are directly related to the ideologies and assumptions they hold and how the way their experiences are culturally and historically situated. Imagery representations students receive, analyze, create or deliver would emerge from their views and knowledges within their diverse contexts and various identities. Pedagogical applications of visual rhetoric have then a twofold aim: it can teach students to ‘read’ and critique the rhetorical moves and purposes within and behind certain visual representations, such as an analysis of multimodal text. It can also enable writers and designers to process their own rhetorical choices as they design their own visuals, bringing to their process aspects of their multiple social-cultural backgrounds as their lived experiences become starting points for knowledge construction.

Visual rhetoric, especially in digital environments, is also aligned with the notion of a commitment to diversity as students become designers, invoking a rhetoric that attends to abilities encompassing other definitions of literacy beyond verbal reading and writing. For example, sequential narrative assignments were well received by students as an easier alternative to rigid structures of traditional academic essays. The multifaceted nature of these miscellaneous representations creates an arena for discussions on political, historical, social and cultural impacts behind those choices to take place in the composition class. Working towards raising students’ awareness of the impact their diverse backgrounds have on their rhetorical choices, teachers will be contributing to forming more conscious and perceptive consumers and composers.

Rhetoric, as a large literary umbrella, is about the study of strategic choices a writer chooses to make. This strategy of reading is a process of trying to understand the objective truth that lies in the author's writing. Reading rhetorically is just as important as understanding the historical nature behind it and how it was derived from the art of persuasion.

The process of reading rhetorically is not only strengthening one's ability to recognize strategic choices, but it’s also expanding their writing abilities that can aid them in any career path they wish to pursue. Instructors are looking to develop their course approaches based on the subject matter, rhetoric, to attempt in supporting and enhancing writing instruction in the classroom setting. Having students form analytic thesis’ or questions is a great first step.

== See also ==
- Media theory of composition
- Visual rhetoric
- Digital rhetoric
- Composition studies
- Multimodality
