= Nadine M. DeLawrence =

American visual artist (1953–1992)

- Born: July 8, 1953; Hartford, Connecticut, U.S.
- Died: November 22, 1992; New York City, New York, U.S.
- Other names: Nadine Delawrence, Nadine DeLawrence Maine, Nadine DeLawrence–Maine
- Education: Rhode Island School of Design
- Occupation(s): Sculptor, installation artist, painter, printmaker
- Spouse: Richard Maine (1982–1992; death)

Nadine M. DeLawrence (July 8, 1953 – November 22, 1992) was an American visual artist and educator. She worked as a sculptor, installation artist, painter, and printmaker. Her artwork was influenced by her interest in African religions and she created large scale installations out of sculptures made in aluminum and steel. She also went by the married name Nadine DeLawrence Maine.

== Early life and education ==
Nadine M. DeLawrence was born on July 8, 1953, in Hartford, Connecticut, to African-American parents Ruth (née Atkins) DeLawrence and Joseph J. DeLawrence Jr. In 1971, she graduated from Weaver High School in Hartford, Connecticut, where she was a merit scholar. In high school she was part of Katarah, an African American cultural society.

DeLawrence graduated from Rhode Island School of Design (RISD), and was part of the European honors program in 1974 to 1975. In the March 8, 1974, student newspaper, RISD Press, DeLawrence wrote a letter to the university president about on-campus racism.

== Career ==
After graduation moved back to Hartford, Connecticut to work at SAND Art Studio as a director, before moving to New York City in 1981 to work at the Solomon R. Guggenheim Museum "Learning Through Art" education program for public school children. While living in New York City, she continued her studies under in printmaking with Robert Blackburn at his Robert Blackburn Printmaking Workshop. She was able to meet Bill Barrett while working at Robert Blackburn Printmaking Workshop, who gave her valuable critique of her sculpture work and helped her grow as an artist. DeLawrence was influenced by African religions and African culture in her work.

In 1982, DeLawrence married Richard "Dick" Maine, a business investor.

Her artwork was exhibited internationally, including at the National Gallery of Botswana, and the French Embassy (1991) in New York City. She also exhibited nationally at Trinity College (1996), the Studio Museum in Harlem (1986), MoMA PS1 (1986), Miami-Dade Community College (1989), and the Fairleigh Dickinson University (1989).

== Death and legacy ==
She died on November 22, 1992, at the age of 39 of cancer in New York City, New York.

Her work is part of permanent museum collections, including the New Jersey State Museum, the Brooklyn Museum, Zimmerli Art Museum at Rutgers University, and Studio Museum in Harlem.
