= Kay Metz =

American artist, printmaker (1932–2018)

- Born: September 3, 1932; Dayton, Ohio
- Died: September 27, 2018 (aged 86); Santa Cruz, California
- Other names: Kathryn E. Metz

Kathryn E. "Kay" Metz (1932–2018) was an American artist and educator known for her printmaking.

Metz was born in Dayton, Ohio on September 3, 1932. She attended Bowling Green State University and University of California, Los Angeles. She traveled to Paris, France to work at Atelier 17. In New York she studied with Robert Blackburn and Philip Guston.

In 1967 Metz was the recipient of a MacDowell fellowship.

Metz settled in California and in 1971 she established the printmaking program at University of California, Santa Cruz. In 1992 she retired from Santa Cruz as Art Professor Emerita.

Metz died on September 27, 2018 in Santa Cruz, California.

Metz's work is in the permanent collection of the Monterey Museum of Art.
