= Niklas Elmehed =

Swedish painter

Niklas Elmehed is a Swedish painter. He is known for his paintings of vinyl and gold leafed Nobel Prize illustrations and portraits which become feature of Nobel Prize ceremonies held every year in the month of October.

== Career ==
Elmehed pursued fine arts in Sweden. He also developed an interest in science, history and journalism. He developed sketch drawings using black and white charcoal, while pursuing his higher studies at the KTH Royal Institute of Technology in Stockholm. It was through mastering the craft of sketch drawings using black and white charcoal, he was inspired to paint drawings with the element of gold foil. He obtained his master's degree at both KTH Royal Institute of Technology and Royal Institute of Art.

He began painting the official portraits of Nobel Prize laureates in 2012. It was revealed that the Nobel Committee had come up with the solution of using paintings instead of relying on photographs in order to publish the images of Nobel Prize laureates officially and in 2012, Elmehed was hired as an art director by the Nobel Media as one of the steps taken by the Nobel Committee to address the longstanding issues related to poor quality photographs, photographs with copyright issues and low resolution images of the award winners that usually circulate online. Elmehed had been tasked with the visual content during the Nobel Prize ceremonies ever since he took charge as art director in 2012. In 2017, Elmehed came up with the idea of using gold foil in his portraits, when the Nobel Committee had decided that the main color to be incorporated during the prize announcements would be gold in a landmark move, following the transition of Nobel Prize which went through a graphical rebranding procedure. His paintings on Noble Prize laureates are frequently displayed and featured in news media outlets after the announcement of Noble Prize winners. His job role is monitored under close supervision and the job role also inculcates on the concept of strict confidentiality as he is one of the fewest individuals to learn about the official Nobel Prize winners well in advance before the official public announcements.

In 2025, Elmehed unveiled “The Golden Wall”, where he displayed and exhibited the portraits of Nobel Prize winners at the Nobel headquarters located in Stockholm, Sweden. He conducted a live painting performance at the Nordic Pavilion of World Expo 2025 in Osaka, Japan. He also displayed his work at the TEDxPatras 2025, where he delivered glimpses of visual storytelling to a large target audience. He also serves as a freelance artist for the Sweden men's national football team.
