= Visual literacy in education =

Visual literacy in education refers to the ability to interpret, analyze, and create meaning from visual texts, including both traditional imagery and digital multimodal content such as videos, infographics, and interactive media. It is considered an essential skill for navigating contemporary digital environments. Visual literacy education also emphasizes equitable access to technology and the ethical use of educational technology to support inclusive and participatory learning.

== History ==
Visual literacy in education has changed over time in response to shifts in pedagogical approaches and technological advances. During the Enlightenment period, visual materials such as illustrations and diagrams were used to support comprehension in disciplines like science, history, and philosophy, enabling learners to grasp complex concepts through visual representations.

In the 19th and early 20th centuries, formal education emphasized print-based literacy, with instruction primarily focused on reading and writing. Visual materials were generally limited to textbook illustrations and blackboard sketches, and learners were often positioned as passive recipients of knowledge within teacher-centered classrooms. Some educational theorists later proposed that students have different learning styles, such as visual, auditory, and kinesthetic styles, which contributed to increased integration of visual media in teaching.

The 20th century saw the rise of audiovisual education, marked by the introduction of tools such as filmstrip projectors, overhead projectors, and educational posters. These developments broadened the definition of visual literacy to include moving images and multimedia formats. In the late 20th and early 21st centuries, advances in digital technology further expanded the scope of visual literacy. Students are increasingly engaged with multimodal content such as video, infographics, interactive media, and data visualization, which requires new instructional strategies for the interpretation and creation of visual information.

These developments have influenced curriculum development, with visual literacy now regarded as an essential component of 21st-century skills and digital-age education. In subjects such as social studies, for example, educators increasingly employ visual sources—such as historical photographs, maps, charts, and material artifacts—to encourage critical engagement with cultural and historical content.

The integration of text and image has become increasingly systematic in educational resources, reflecting a broader shift toward multimodal learning approaches. This trend is supported by research in graphic design and literacy education that highlights how combining visual and textual information enhances student engagement, comprehension, and critical thinking.

== Advancements of multimedia ==
Multimedia advancements have changed classroom literacy instruction, emphasizing the need for students to engage with texts that combine words, images, sound, and design. Students use a variety of digital tools, including interactive storyboarding platforms, video editing software, data visualization programs, and collaborative web-based media, to create multimodal projects that extend beyond traditional slide presentations. This presents a challenge for educators seeking to prepare students for a media-driven environment.

Educators acknowledge that many students find it challenging not only to accurately interpret visual content but also to think critically and make ethical judgments about images. This highlights the importance of teaching methods based on visual literacy frameworks, which focus on developing students’ abilities to analyze, evaluate, and create a wide range of visual media with critical and ethical awareness. Some school districts have added educational technology to their curricula. For example, instead of submitting papers, students can create short films or interactive essays, giving them hands-on experience with multimedia tools.

== Artificial intelligence and synthetic media ==
Recent developments in educational technology include responses to generative artificial intelligence and deepfake media. Research suggests that targeted media literacy frameworks help students identify visual objects, evaluate digital trust, and detect manipulated imagery. Several scholars have proposed structured pedagogical strategies to train students to distinguish between authentic and AI-generated photography.

== Teaching visual literacy ==
Teaching visual literacy involves helping students understand and create meaning from a range of visual formats. This is often supported by educational approaches that emphasize interpretation, graphic design, and effective communication across different media. Visual texts appear in various everyday contexts, including books, the internet, environmental signage, television, tablet devices, and touchscreen machines like ATMs. Teaching visual literacy includes guiding students to critically analyze these visual messages, particularly those presented through advertising and digital media. It also involves providing students with the tools to create visual content—such as videos, infographics, and digital stories—to help them build multimodal literacy skills suited to the communication demands of the 21st century.

To counter misinformation on social media and internet platforms, some educators have integrated structured evaluation models such as Caulfield's SIFT method, which instructs learners to stop, investigate the source, find better coverage, and trace claims back to their original context.

Some teachers use classroom blogs and wikis to keep their students informed of class requirements and to encourage collaborative class discussions. Students increasingly rely on technology to enhance their learning environments.

An attempt to observe children reading and writing visual texts was made by twenty US and Australian teachers between 1990 and 1994, with a follow-up in 2011. The visual texts studied were limited to those used in non-fiction books, e-books, and websites—such as diagrams, maps, storyboards, flowcharts, timelines, webs, trees, and tables. Moline argues that a strategy called "recomposing" assists in essay planning and comprehension. Recomposing is described as reading information in a lexical format (such as a paragraph) and summarizing it in a visual format (such as a flowchart or table). The visual then forms the framework for the student's essay.

Educators have increasingly advocated for visual literacy as an essential skill because of the growing use of visuals in society and education. Scholars like George emphasize shifting writing pedagogy from analysis to design, enabling students to create visual texts such as websites, brochures, and other multimedia products. This focus on visual communication aligns with rhetorical education, which encourages students to understand how images, layout, and design interact to convey meaning and influence audiences. Other research also highlights the need to support students in interpreting complex visual texts. According to Cappello, this includes analyzing elements like color, layout, and symbolism, which can enhance students’ comprehension and promote creativity and critical thinking.

Educators guide secondary students to critically examine multimodal design elements, including intentional color choices, layout configuration, and symbolic messaging.

== Visual literacy in diverse educational contexts ==
Visual literacy varies across cultural, linguistic, and technological settings. Learners from multilingual or non-Western backgrounds may interpret images differently due to diverse semiotic systems and cultural meanings. Incorporating locally relevant visuals and multimodal materials can enhance understanding and engagement, especially in classrooms where language or text-based resources are limited.

In low-resource or rural contexts, visuals such as diagrams, picture books, and maps serve as essential learning tools. However, many teachers report limited training in designing and using such materials effectively, particularly outside of STEM subjects. Expanding teacher education and integrating visual literacy into diverse curricula can support more inclusive and equitable learning environments.

Integrated media literacy models help align visual literacy instruction with state and national education standards and support pre-service teacher preparation for K-12 classrooms. Phenomenon-based visual learning strategies help upper-level students examine digital trust and evaluate media across modern digital platforms.

== Benefits ==
With the growing prominence of digital media in daily life, visual communication has become a key competency in educational, professional, and social environments. Rather than relying solely on computer use, individuals interact with images and multimedia content through platforms such as social media, virtual learning environments, and collaborative digital tools.

The benefits of visual literacy instruction include improved communication, critical thinking, and creativity. These skills are often developed through multimodal learning activities such as designing infographics, interpreting media messages, and creating digital narratives, which encourage students to analyze, synthesize, and express ideas visually and contextually. Avgerinou and Ericson emphasize that visual literacy equips individuals with the skills to interpret and evaluate the visual media encountered daily and to communicate more informally and effectively. Lee and Khadka argue that visual literacy can enhance problem-solving by encouraging students to integrate textual and visual information; for example, assignments like digital storytelling or visual presentations can help improve creativity and critical thinking skills.

== Uses in higher education ==
As technology advances, so too do the tools that educators use to teach visual literacy skills to students. Digital tools such as augmented reality (AR) models, interactive simulations, and digital mapping are increasingly used in higher education to support visual literacy. These technologies enable students to critically analyze and create complex visual information, promoting skills in digital communication, problem-solving, and multimodal expression, in alignment with contemporary digital pedagogy.

Visual literacy has become increasingly recognized in higher education through its inclusion in curricula, collaboration across disciplines, and the creation of assessment frameworks that encourage multimodal learning. For example, some universities now include visual literacy outcomes as part of their general education requirements. Lee and Khadka discuss the role of multimedia curricula in improving students' ability to navigate complex multimodal environments and their digital literacy. Frisicaro-Pawlowski and Monge emphasize the value of collaboration between librarians and first-year composition (FYC) instructors in teaching visual literacy. Through this collaboration, instructors can design assignments that integrate textual and visual elements, such as infographics or multimodal essays, to help students analyze visual rhetoric. According to the authors, this approach helps students build critical thinking skills, encourages interdisciplinary teamwork, and prepares them to navigate digital communication responsibly by considering ethical and equitable use of visual materials.

== See also ==
- Learning Through Art
- Visual culture
- Visual literacy
