= Visual narrative =

Story told primarily through the use of visual media

A visual narrative (also visual storytelling) is a story told primarily through the use of visual media. This can be images in the mind, digital, and traditional media. The story may be told using still photography, illustration, or film, and can be enhanced with graphics, music, voice and other audio.

== Overview ==
The term "visual narrative" has been used to describe several genres of visual storytelling, from news and information (photojournalism, the photo essay, the documentary film) to entertainment (art, movies, television, comic books, the graphic novel). In short, any kind of a story, told visually, is a visual narrative.

It can also be used as a form of visual communication as people naturally use stories to understand the world and express their stories. In some circumstances, visual narrative can be misleading, misinformative, or disinformative.

Visual narratives are of interest to the academic community to understand the impact and power of image and narrative in individuals and societies. The corresponding discipline is called visual narratology.

Visual narrative might include:

- stories from a point of view
- images, still or moving
- glimpses on a specific subject
- an appeal for transformation in attitudes and behaviors

== See also ==
- Multiliteracy
- Sequential art
- Visual literacy
