= Object literacy =

Object literacy is a relatively new term that has grown out of object-based learning (OBL), a fundamental approach to teaching the practice of museum and library work. The increasing availability of digital images and texts makes objects more accessible than ever. There is an increasing interest in the physicality of the object or text, and a growing understanding of the need to understand objects and texts in the fullest, most comprehensive context.

== Definitions ==
- "Object literacy is a special skill gained through the process of discovery and discussion about original objects. It is a skill which, like others, must be learned. Museums have original objects, artifacts, or works of art. Therefore, museums are logical places in which to teach people to become object literate." — Sally Leahy (1995)
- Object literacy is also seen as "a subset of visual literacy, leading to a new brand of museum literacy." — Carin Jacobs (2009)
- Object literacy recognizes "the current trend for printed material and text as a visual medium" in which people "study ways in which the physical aspects of rare books [and other objects] contribute to the understanding the text".

== Recent projects ==
- University College London (UCL): "In keeping with the UCL 2034 strategy, the Connected Curriculum encourages participation in research at all levels of study and OBL methods enable interdisciplinary inquiry and collaborative practices."
- Object Literacy: Research through Epigraphy and Inscriptions in Chinese Art History: A CHASE Cohort Development Fund doctoral training program for 2017–18 comprising three one-day workshops held at SOAS the University of London and the Victoria & Albert Museum, British Museum and British Library.

== See also ==
- Epigraphy
- Museum studies
- Visual literacy
