= Learning Through Art =

Educational program

Learning Through Art is an educational program of the Solomon R. Guggenheim Museum. LTA pairs practicing artists with participating public elementary school classrooms throughout the five boroughs of New York City. These resident artists spend one day a week for a period of 10 or 20 weeks working with classroom instructors to create and execute an art curriculum for the students that ties in with current Guggenheim exhibitions and supports the core curriculum learning inside of the classroom. Participating classrooms visit the Guggenheim multiple times throughout the duration of their program, and student artwork is shown in a culminating exhibition at the Guggenheim Museum in their annual A Year With Children showcase.

== History ==
In 1970, in response to the cutting of art and music programs in New York City public schools, Natalie K. Lieberman started a program called Learning to Read Through the Arts. Later becoming a Guggenheim trustee, in 1994 the program was merged with the Guggenheim Foundation. In its first 35 years, LTA has worked with hundreds of resident artists to serve approximately 138,500 New York City schoolchildren in dozens of public schools.

== Methods ==
At the core of the LTA philosophy is the belief that artwork can, and, in today's image-saturated culture, should, be taught to be read much like a traditional text. Teaching students to talk about art the way they would talk about text gives them a forum to practice critical-thinking skills and become active participants in a work, be that work visual or text based. Unlike text, however, works of art provide a highly accessible way for students to practice these necessary reading skills without having to worry about stumbling over a difficult word, flip through pages to find a quote, or struggle with decoding written text.

Additionally, it may be easier to find visual artworks open to a wide array of interpretation - thus lending themselves to be contoured more easily towards a specific teaching point (es: mood) while at the same time inviting more varied discussion from students. This is because we as a culture have grown familiar with abstract art, abstract expressionism and surrealism for example, whereas we remain extremely uncomfortable with literature that approaches abstraction.

Critical-thinking skills are developed through open-ended questions and conversations between instructor and student. This practice is called Inquiry. Questions such as: "What do you notice about this painting? What can we guess about this place? Compare this place to your own neighborhood. How is it similar? How is it different?" are similar to the kinds of conversations that would take place around text in the classroom. Students are asked to back up their interpretations of the artwork with explanations of details in the piece that lead them to their conclusion; multiple interpretations of the work are encouraged by discussion facilitators, such as "Does everyone agree? Are there any other ideas?" Through inquiry, students not only develop visual literacy skills that transfer to textual literacies, but an important groundwork is laid in the grammar and value of group discussion.

== Literacy skills ==
In 2006, results of a three-year study confirmed fundamental literacy skills were developed through participation in inquiry with art. The study, Teaching Literacy Through Art, was administered by the LTA program, conducted by Randi Korn & Associates, and funded by the U.S. Department of Education. The study examined groups of third graders at P.S. 148 in Queens, and P.S. 86 in the Bronx. Along with classroom discussion of texts and visual documents, for the purposes of this study students were asked to discuss the painting The Artist and His Mother by Arshile Gorky (1926), and an excerpt from Cynthia Kabohata's 2004 book Kira-Kira. The study found that the third grade students who participated in the LTA program and had ample practice talking critically about works of art using inquiry, used more words to express themselves and demonstrated higher achievement in six categories of literacy and critical-thinking skills than their peers who had no experience with inquiry and visual documents. Categories of improved literacy skills were: thorough description, extended focus, hypothesizing, evidential reasoning, providing multiple interpretations, and building schema.

== See also ==
- Visual literacy
- Visual literacy in education
