= Robert Blackburn Printmaking Workshop =

The EFA Robert Blackburn Printmaking Workshop is a 4000 square foot printmaking facility in Manhattan. The space is run by the Elizabeth Foundation for the Arts, and modeled on a similar printmaking workshop run by Robert Blackburn. It features traditional printing, editioning rooms, steel facing services, stone preparation, photo lithography plate production, and risograph printing.

== History ==
Robert Blackburn first established a workshop in 1947 in his loft apartment in Chelsea. The facility and its cooperative structure welcomed a variety of artists during the 1950s and 1960s. It formally incorporated into a not-for-profit organization called "Printmaking Workshop" in 1971, which lasted until 2001. Before his 2003 death, Blackburn encouraged the Elizabeth Foundation of the Arts to establish a new organization to provide similar services to artists in New York. The foundation agreed and opened new Printmaking Workshop, named in Blackburn's honor, in September 2005.
