= Visual rhetoric =

Communication through visual elements

Visual rhetoric is the art of effective communication through visual elements such as images, typography, and texts. Visual rhetoric encompasses the skill of visual literacy and the ability to analyze images for their form and meaning. Drawing on techniques from semiotics and rhetorical analysis, visual rhetoric expands on visual literacy as it examines the structure of an image with the focus on its persuasive effects on an audience.

Although visual rhetoric also involves typography and other texts, it concentrates mainly on the use of images or visual texts. Using images is central to visual rhetoric because these visuals help either form the case an image alone wants to convey or argue the point a writer formulates, in the case of a multimodal text that combines image and written text, for example. Visual rhetoric has gained greater notoriety as recent scholarly work has explored alternative media forms, including graphics, screen design, and other hybrid visual representations that do not privilege print culture and conventions. Also, visual rhetoric involves how writers arrange segments of a visual text on the page. In addition, visual rhetoric involves the selection of fonts, contrasting colors, and graphs, among other elements, to shape a visual rhetoric text. One vital component of visual rhetoric is analyzing the visual text. The interactional and commonly hybrid nature of cyberspaces that usually mixes print text and visual images enable some detachment of them as isolated constructs, and scholarship has claimed that especially in virtual spaces where print text and visuals are usually combined, there is no place either for emphasizing one mode over another. One way of analyzing a visual text is to look for its significant meaning.

Simply put, the meaning should be deeper than the literal sense that a visual text holds. One way to analyze a visual text is to dissect it so the viewer can understand its tenor. Viewers can break the text into smaller parts and share perspectives to reach its meaning. In analyzing a text that includes an image of the bald eagle, as the main body of the visual text, questions of representation and connotation come into play. Analyzing a text that includes a photo, painting, or even a cartoon of the bold eagle, along with written words, would bring to mind the conceptions of strength and freedom, rather than the conception of merely a bird.

This includes an understanding of the creative and rhetorical choices made with coloring, shaping, and object placement. The power of imagery, iconic photographs, for instance, can potentially generate actions in a global scale. Rhetorical choices carry great significance that surpass reinforcement of the written text. Each choice, font, color, or layout, represents a different message that the author wants to portray for the audience. Visual rhetoric emphasizes images as sensory expressions of cultural and contextual meaning, as opposed to purely aesthetic consideration. Analyzing visuals and their power to convey messages is central to incorporating visual rhetoric within the digital era, as nuances of choices regarding audience, purpose, and genre can be analyzed within a single frame, and the rationale behind designers' rhetorical choices can be revealed and analyzed by how the elements of visuals play out altogether. Visual rhetoric has been approached and applied in a variety of academic fields, including art history, linguistics, semiotics, cultural studies, business and technical communication, speech communication, and classical rhetoric. Visual rhetoric seeks to develop rhetorical theory in a way that is more comprehensive and inclusive with regard to images and their interpretations.

== History and origin ==
The term rhetoric originated in ancient Greece, and its concept has been widely discussed for thousands of years. Sophists first coined the idea as an abstract term to help label the concept, while Aristotle more narrowly defined rhetoric as a message's potential to influence audiences. Linguists and other researchers often define rhetoric through the well-known five canons of rhetoric. Over time, this definition has evolved, expanded, and raised serious debate as new digital communication channels have developed.

In his book Elements of Criticism, rhetorician Lord Kames (also known as Henry Home) laid the groundwork for later rhetoricians by taking the controversial stance of including visual art in his theory of criticism. Kames argued many of the same points as other Enlightenment scholars—mainly that art was beneficial to the public—and worthy of note and praise—if it was encouraging a moral improvement of its audience.

In 1977, French theorist Roland Barthes brought to light a new way to evaluate other communication media, showing the relevance of traditional rhetorical theories to the still photographic medium. Barthes explained visual rhetoric generally as the implied and interpreted messages from the work, yet these bigger messages often extend beyond the initial superficial interpretation. Visual rhetoric uses a variety of tools to hook readers within its mediums (e.g. gifs). Although similar in nature, one striking difference between visual and classical rhetoric is the newfound outlook on Aristotle's original canons. Linda Scott created a newfound audience by constructing new cannons exclusive to visual rhetoric. Instead of closely monitoring the content, as with the initial five canons, Scott's focused on the visual medium's ability to invent and argument, arrangement of the item, and all coupled with a meaningful delivery of presentation. Since its inception, popular studies have appeared in academic publications discussing the role of visual rhetoric in many facets of human life, especially advertising.

The term emerged largely as an effort to set aside a certain area of study that would focus attention on specific rhetorical elements of visual media. Historically, the study of rhetoric has been geared toward linguistics. Visual symbols were deemed trivial and subservient and thus were largely ignored as part of a rhetorical argument. As a result, modern rhetorical theory developed with a significant exclusion of these visual symbols, ignoring the field of visual rhetoric as a separate area of study. Scholars of visual rhetoric analyze photographs, drawings, paintings, graphs and tables, interior design and architecture, sculpture, Internet images, and film. From a rhetorical perspective, the focus is on the contextual response rather than the aesthetic response. An aesthetic response is a viewer's direct perception of the sensory aspects of the visual, whereas with a rhetorical response, meaning is given to the visual. Every part of the artifact has significance in the message being conveyed; each line, each shading, each person has a purpose. As visual rhetoricians study images and symbols, their findings catalyze challenges to the linguistic meaning altogether, allowing a more holistic study of the rhetorical argument to emerge with the introduction of visual elements.

== Related studies ==
=== Composition ===
The field of composition studies has recently returned its attention to visual rhetoric. In an increasingly visual society, proponents of visual rhetoric in composition classes suggest that increased literacy requires writing and visual communication skills. In relation to visual rhetoric, the composition field positions itself, more broadly, into challenging reductive definitions of composing and rhetoric that gravitate toward verbal communication only. Touching upon rhetorical processes/decisions that affect a visual design is a venue for calling composition scholars’ attention to the function that arrangements of images and words play out in writing practices and thus communication, emphasizing the complex relationship between verbal and visual meanings. Visual communication skills relate to an understanding of the mediated nature of all communication, especially to an awareness of the act of representation. Visual rhetoric can be utilized in a composition classroom to assist with writing and rhetoric development.

A stop sign is an example of semiotics in everyday life. Drivers understand that the sign means they must stop. Stop signs exist in a larger context of road signs, all with different meanings, designed for traffic safety.

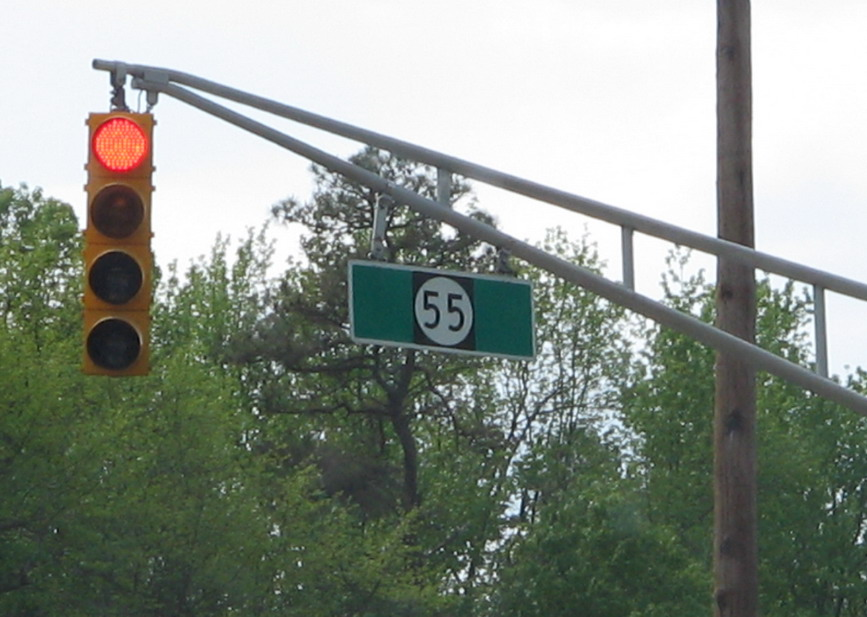
A traffic light is another example of everyday semiotics that people use on a daily basis, especially on the road. It is a set of automatically operated colored lights, typically red, yellow, and green, used to control traffic at road junctions and crosswalks. Those who drive understand the meaning of each color without the usage of written words.

=== Semiotics ===
Semiotic theory is defined as a theory that seeks to describe the rhetorical significance of sign-making. The central idea of the theory is that a sign does not exist outside a contextual experience; it exists only in relation to other signs, objects, and entities. Therefore, the sign belongs to a larger system, and when taken out of the context of other signs, is rendered meaningless and uncommunicable. The parts of a semiotic are divided into two parts: the material part of the sign is known as the form of expression, the meaning of the form of expression is known as form of content. In semiotic theory, the expression only has meaningful content when existing in a larger contextual framework.

=== Areas of focus ===
While studying visual objects, rhetorical scholars tend to focus on three areas: nature, function, or evaluation. Nature encompasses the literal components of the artifact. This is a primary focus of visual rhetoric because, in order to understand the function of an image, it is necessary to understand the substantive and stylistic nature of the artifact itself. Function holds a somewhat literal definition—it represents the purpose an image serves for an audience. The function, or purpose, of an image may be to evoke a certain emotion. The evaluation of an artifact determines if the image serves its function.

== Rhetorical application ==
Visual rhetoric studies how humans use images to communicate. Elements of images, such as size, color, line, and shape, are used to convey messages. In images, meanings are created by the layout and spatial positions of these elements. The entities that constitute an image are socially, politically, and culturally constructed. The same image may represent different rhetorical meanings depending on the audience. The choice and arrangement of the elements in an image should be used to achieve the desired rhetorical effects and convey messages accurately to specific audiences, societies, and cultures.

The use of images is a conscious, communicative decision, as the colors, forms, media, and sizes are each chosen intentionally. However, a person may come in contact with a sign, but if they have no relation to the sign, its message is arbitrary. Therefore, for artifacts or products to be conceptualized as visual rhetoric, they must be symbolic, involve human intervention, and be presented to an audience to communicate.

In "The Rhetoric of the Image", Roland Barthes examines the semiotic nature of images and how they function to communicate specific messages. Barthes points out that messages transmitted by visual images include coded iconic and non-coded iconic linguistic messages. Visual rhetorical images can be categorized into two dimensions: meaning operation and visual structure. Meaning operation refers to the relations and connections between elements in visual images. Visual structure refers to the way that the elements are visually displayed.

=== Analysis terminology ===
Rhetorical critics have borrowed analysis terminology from C.S. Peirce to accomplish direct analysis of visual messages. Icon (or iconic signs), index (or indexical signs), and symbol (or symbolic signs) are three basic categories of recognizable characteristics of visual messages. Icons, or iconic signs, are recognized based on resemblance to known elements or items (e.g., one's ID photo on a company badge). Indexes, or indexical signs, are recognized based on an understanding of a visual trace, imprint, or element that signals prior activity, or process, the agent of which is no longer visible (e.g., tire tracks in the sand). Symbols, or symbolic signs, are recognized only on the basis of a shared, learned code of visual signs (e.g., a Mercedes-Benz logo, or any printed word in any written language). These three types of visual signs, individually or in combination, make up the visual design elements of nearly all visual messages.

== Modern application ==
Visual images have always played a role in communication; however, recent technological advancements have enabled users to produce and share images on a mass scale. The mass communication of images has made spread of news and information a much quicker process. As a result, certain images may go "viral," meaning they have been shared and seen by a large audience and have attracted mainstream media attention. Images are utilized in a variety of ways for a number of purposes. From business to art to entertainment, the versatility of images in popular culture has some scholars arguing that words will eventually become outdated.

=== Rhetorical analysis of an image ===
- Determine the audience, i.e. the intended readership/viewer of the text.
- Determine the purpose, i.e. the importance of the message behind the image.
- Determine the context and meaning(s) behind the image/text.

==== Analyzing the design choices of an image ====
- Emphasis: search for the stress of the image; where does the author/artist want the audience's attention to go?
- Contrast: search for the element that stands out in the image; where is the emphasis in the image?
- Color: helps the audience figure out the emphasis of an image. Why were certain colors used in this image? What does the choice of these colors tell us?
- Organization: the arrangement of elements that make the image a whole. How is the image organized? What does the image's organization tell the audience?
- Alignment: the line up of the image. How does the image's alignment affect how the audience's eyes view it?
- Proximity: the space used (or not used) in an image. How close (or not so close) are the elements portrayed in the image? What meaning does that make?

=== Visual communication design ===
==== Method of appeal ====
Aristotle proposed three types of appeal to an audience:

- Ethos is the appeal to ethics or integrity.
- Pathos is the appeal to emotions
- Logos is the appeal to logic or reason

These techniques are skills learned and used by visual communication designers today, such as in advertising. Each of these methods of appeal has the ability to influence its audience in different ways. Methods of appeal can also be combined to strengthen the underlying message.

==== Visual literacy ====
Visual literacy is the ability to read, analyze, and evoke meaning from visual text through the means of visual grammar. Visual Communication Designers depend on their audience having visual literacy to comprehend their outputted materials.

==== Visual ethics ====
Research has shown that there are ethical implications to the presentation of visuals. "Visuals present the risk of, all too easily, swaying their audiences in an unethical fashion." Advances in technology have made it easier to manipulate and distort visuals. Visual communicators are expected to accurately portray information and avoid misleading or deceiving viewers.

==== Advertisements ====
Advertisers know that consumers can associate one thing with another; therefore, when an ad shows two things that seem different, they know the consumer will find a connection between them. Advertisers also find ways to make sure that the consumer creates a positive association between what they are selling and whatever they are associating their product with.

In advertising, there are nine main classifications for how ads incorporate visual rhetoric. These classifications vary in complexity, with the least complex being when advertisers juxtapose their product with another image (listed as 1,2,3). After juxtaposition, the complexity is increased with fusion, which is when an advertiser's product is combined with another image (listed as 4,5,6). The most complex is replacement, which replaces the product with another product (listed as 7,8,9). Each of these sections also includes a variety of richness. The least rich would be connection, which shows how one product is associated with another product (listed as 1,4,7). The next rich would be similarity, which shows how a product is like another product or image (listed as 2,5,8). Finally, the most rich would be opposition, which is when advertisers show how their product is not like another product or image (listed as 3,6,9).

1. Advertisers can put their product next to another image in order to have the consumer associate their product with the presented image.
2. Advertisers can put their product next to another image to show the similarity between their product and the presented image.
3. Advertisers can put their product next to another image in order to show the consumer that their product is nothing like what the image shows.
4. Advertisers can combine their product with an image in order to have the consumer associate their product with the presented image.
5. Advertisers can combine their product with an image to show the similarity between their product and the presented image.
6. Advertisers can combine their product with another image in order to show the consumer that their product is nothing like what the image shows.
7. Advertisers can replace their product with an image to have the consumer associate their product with the presented image.
8. Advertisers can replace their product with an image to show the similarity between their product and the presented image.
9. Advertisers can replace their product with another image to show the consumer that their product is nothing like what the image shows.

Each of these categories varies in complexity, where putting a product next to a chosen image is the simplest and replacing the product entirely is the most complex. The reason why putting a product next to a chosen image is the most simple is because the consumer has already been shown that there is a connection between the two. In other words, the consumer just has to figure out why there is the connection. However, when advertisers replace the product that they are selling with another image, then the consumer must first figure out the connection and figure out why the connection was made.

=== Visual arts ===
Visual tropes and tropic thinking are a part of visual rhetoric. While the field of visual rhetoric isn't necessarily concerned with the aesthetic choices of a piece, the same principles of visual composition may be applied to the study and practice of visual art. For example, figures of speech, such as personification or allusion, may be implemented in the creation of an artwork. A painting may allude to peace with an olive branch or to Christianity with a cross; in the same way, an artwork may employ personification by attributing human qualities to a non-human entity. In general, however, visual art is a separate field of study than visual rhetoric.

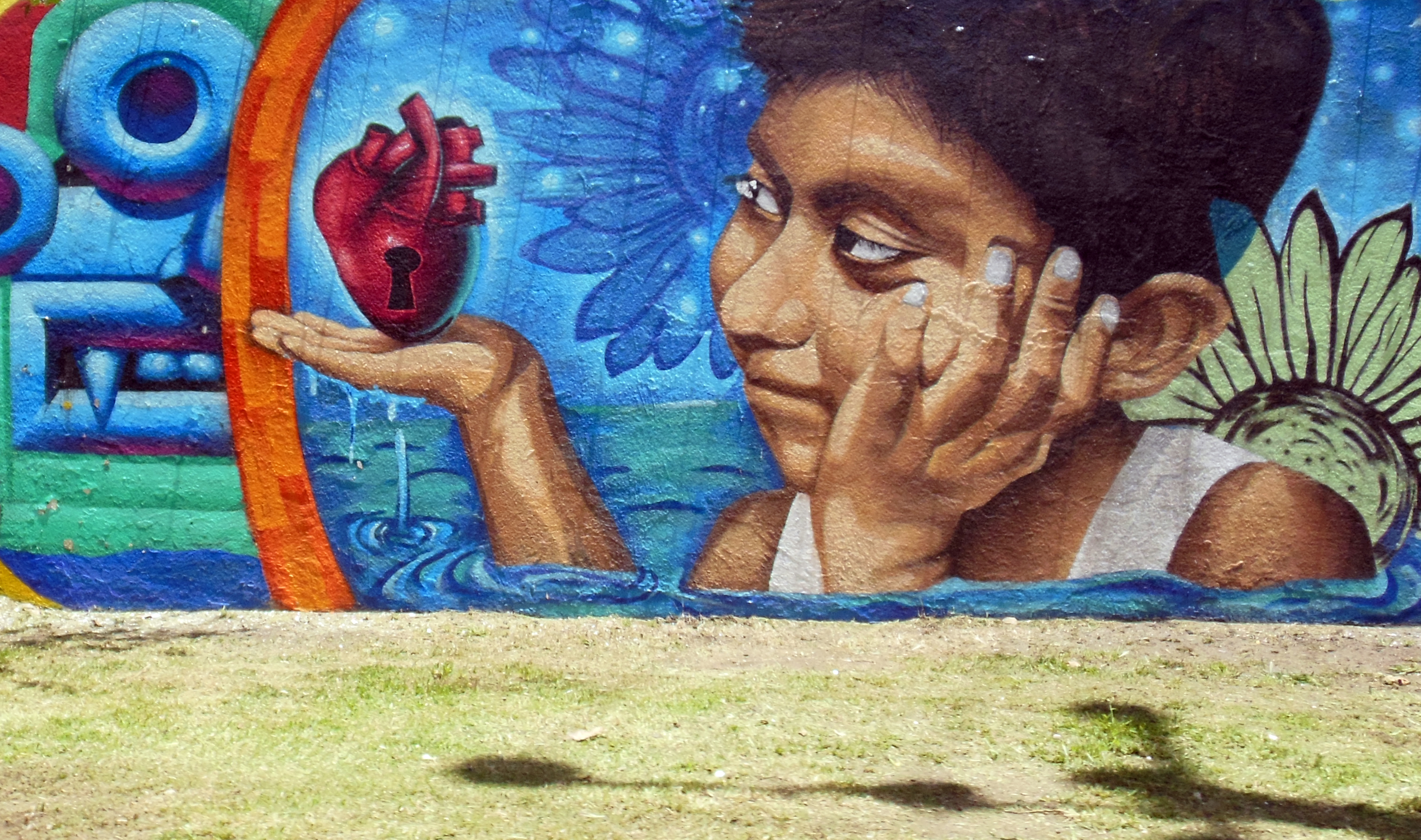
This image portrays a young person holding a heart. Instead of looking at this image literally, rhetoricians will observe the keyhole in the heart's center and think critically about this image's significance.

=== Graffiti ===
Graffiti is a "pictorial or visual inscription on a publically [sic] accessible surface." According to scholar David Hanauer, graffiti achieves three functions; the first is to allow marginalized texts to participate in the public discourse, the second is that graffiti serves the purpose of openly expressing "controversial contents", and the third is to allow "marginal groups to the possibility of expressing themselves publicly." Hanauer also wrote that graffiti has been shown to embody personal psychological content. Bates and Martin note that this form of rhetoric has been around even in ancient Pompeii, with an example from 79 A.D. reading, "Oh wall, so many men have come here to scrawl, I wonder that your burdened sides don't fall". Gross and Gross indicated that graffiti is capable of serving a rhetorical purpose. Within a more modern context, Wiens' (2014) research showed that graffiti can be considered an alternative way of creating rhetorical meaning for issues such as homelessness. Furthermore, according to Ley and Cybriwsky graffiti can be an expression of territory, especially within the context of gangs. This form of visual rhetoric is meant to communicate meaning to anyone who so happens to see it, and due to its long history and prevalence, several styles and techniques have emerged to capture the attention of an audience. Gang members may send messages to rival gangs, or mark their territory with the use of graffiti and, in some cases, rivals will cross out a rival gang’s graffiti or mark over it with threatening phrases, such as RIP. Tags, a form of graffiti, are stylized signatures or logos unique to each graffiti writer. These tags are used by contemporary graffiti writers to distinguish signatures that identify the individuals who write them. Since its appearance thirty-five years ago, tagging has become a communication found in many cities around the world to say when someone was at that place.

=== Text ===
While visual rhetoric is usually applied to denote the non-textual artifacts, the use and presentation of words is still critical to understanding the visual argument as a whole. Beyond how a message is conveyed, the presentation of that message encompasses the study and practice of typography. Professionals in fields from graphic design to book publishing make deliberate choices about how a typeface looks, including but not limited to concerns of functionality, emotional evocations, and cultural context.

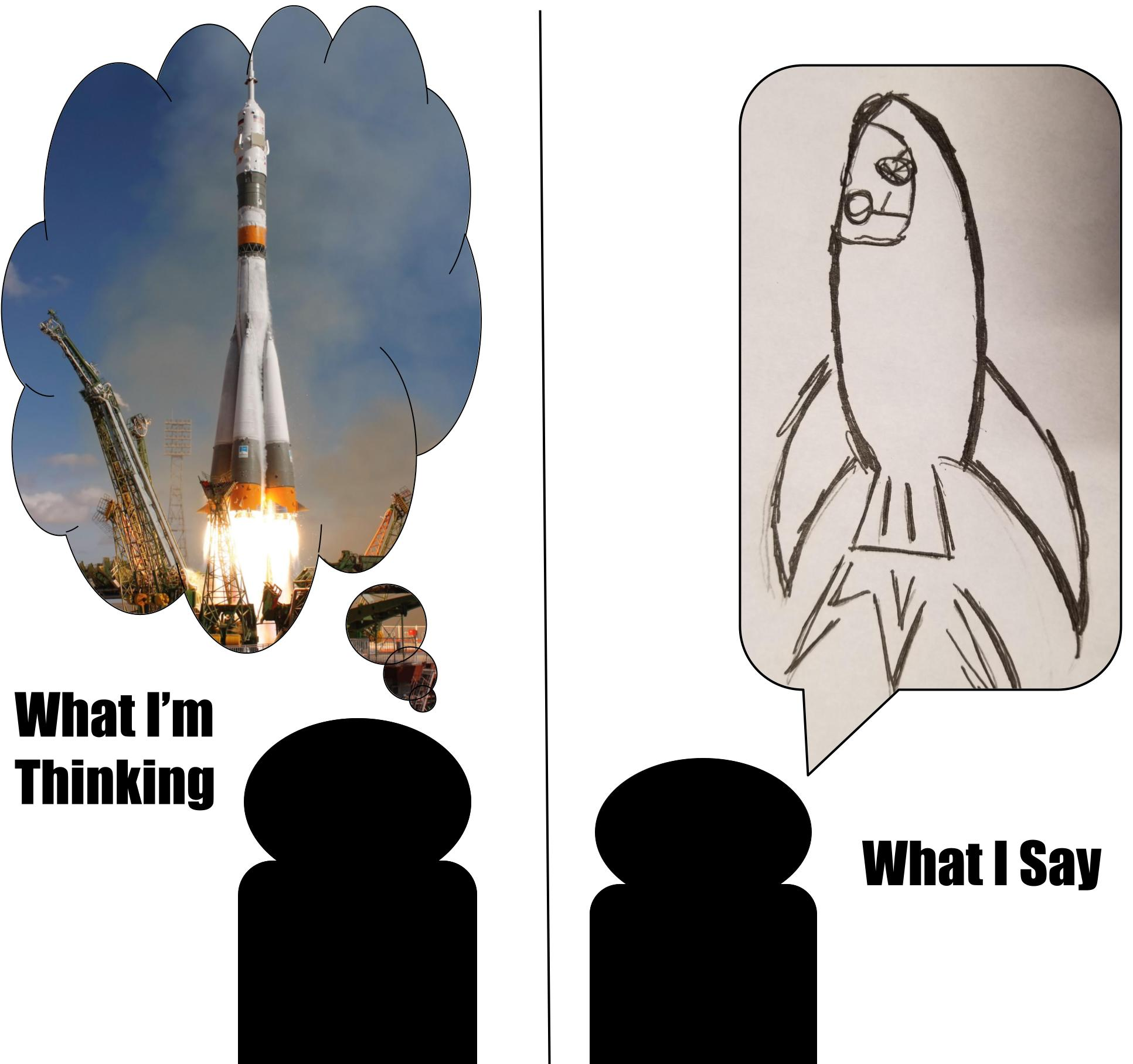
An example of a simple meme. Identifiable symbols fill gaps in meaning where text is absent.

=== Memes ===
Though a relatively new way of using images, visual Internet memes are one of the more pervasive forms of visual rhetoric. Visual memes represent a genre of visual communication that often combines images and text to create meaning. Visual memes can be understood through visual rhetoric, which "combines elements of the semiotic and discursive approaches to analyze the persuasive elements of visual texts." Furthermore, memes fit into this rhetorical category because of their persuasive nature and their ability "to draw viewers into the argument's construction via the viewer's cognitive role in completing "visual enthymemes" to fill in the unstated premise." The visual portion of the meme is a part of its multimodal grammar, allowing a person to decode the text through "cultural codes" that contextualize the image to construct meaning. Because of what is unstated, memetic images can hold multiple interpretations. As groups create and share a specific meme template what is unstated becomes a fixed reading with "novel expression".

Shifman, in an analysis of KnowYourMeme.com, found that popular memetic images often feature juxtaposition and frozen motion. Juxtaposition frames clashing visual elements in order to "deepen the ridicule" with a large incongruity or diminishes the original contrast by taking the visual object into a more fitting situation. Frozen motion pictures an action made static, leaving the viewer to complete the motion in order to complete the premise.

Considered by some scholars to be a subversive form of communication, memetic images have been used to unify political movements, such as umbrellas during the Umbrella Movement in Hong Kong or the images of tea bags by the Tea Party Movement in 2009.

According to a 2013 study by Bauckhage, et al., the temporal nature of most memes and their "hype cycles" of popularity are in line with the behavior of a typical fad and suggest that after they proliferate and become mainstream, memes quickly lose their appeal and popularity. Once it has lost its appeal, a meme is pronounced "dead" to signify its overuse or mainstream appearance.

Among the intrinsic factors of memes that affect their potential rise to popularity is similarity. A 2014 study conducted by researcher Michele Coscia concluded that meme similarity has a negative correlation to meme popularity, and can therefore be used, along with factors like social network structure, to explain the popularity of various memes. A 2015 study by Mazambani et al. concluded that other factors of influence in meme spread within an online community include how relevant a meme is to the "topic focus" or theme of the online community as well as whether the posting user is in a position of power within an online setting. Memes that are consistent with a group's theme and memes that originate from lower-status members within the group spread faster than memes that are inconsistent and are created by members of a group that are in positions of power.

Scholars like Jakub Nowak propose the idea of popular driven media as well. Successful memes originate and proliferate by means of anonymous internet users, not entities like corporations or political parties that have an agenda. For this reason, anonymity is linked to meme popularity and credibility. Nowak asserts that meme authorship should remain anonymous, because this is the only way to let people make the statements that they want to freely.

== See also ==
- Digital rhetoric
- Media influence
- Media theory of composition
- Rhetoric
- Visual communication
- Visual culture
- Visual literacy
- Visualization (graphics)
