= Visual literacy =

Ability to interpret information in images

External videos
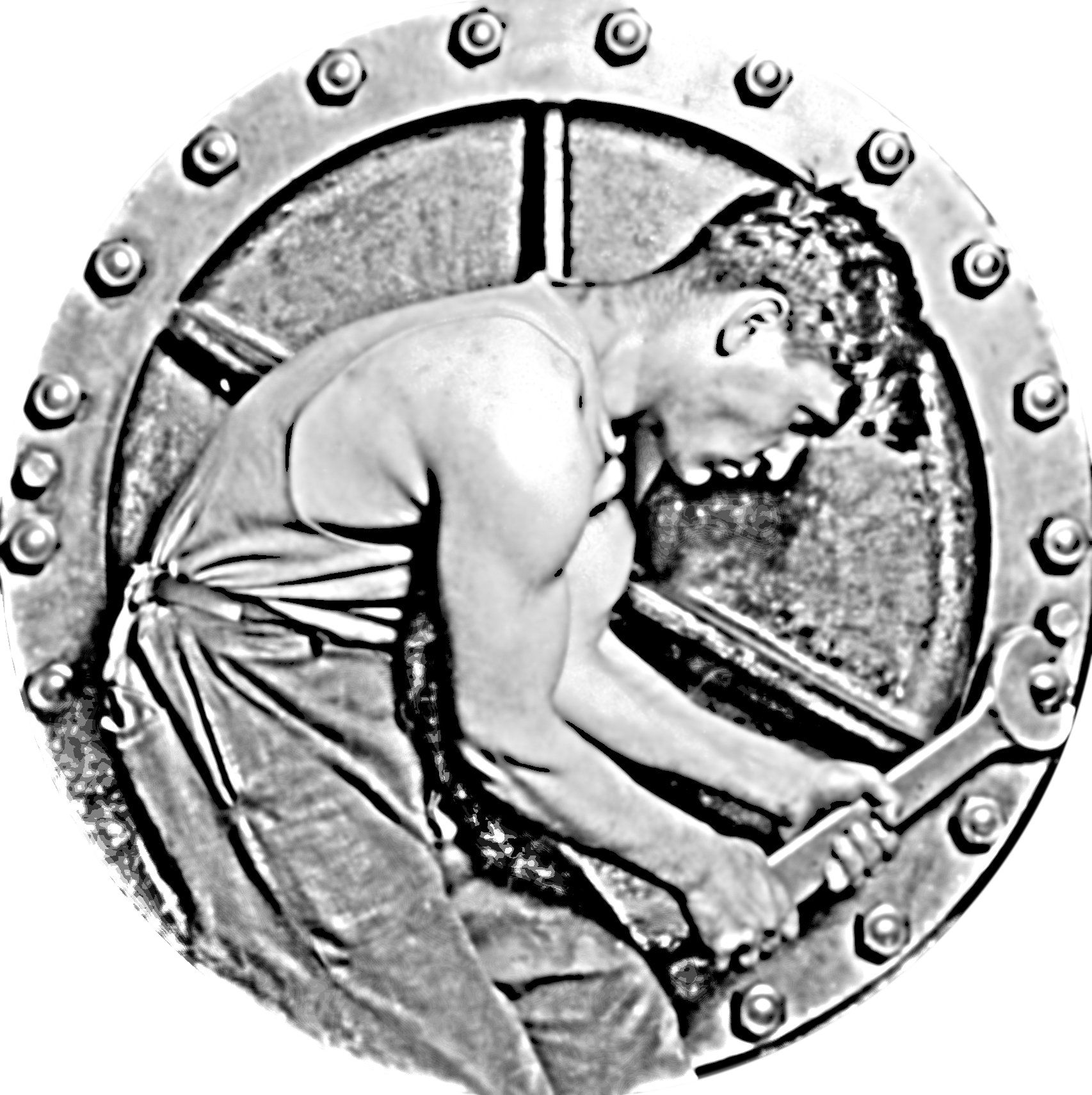
- Sight Reading: Photography and the Legible World, 4:03, Morgan Library and Museum

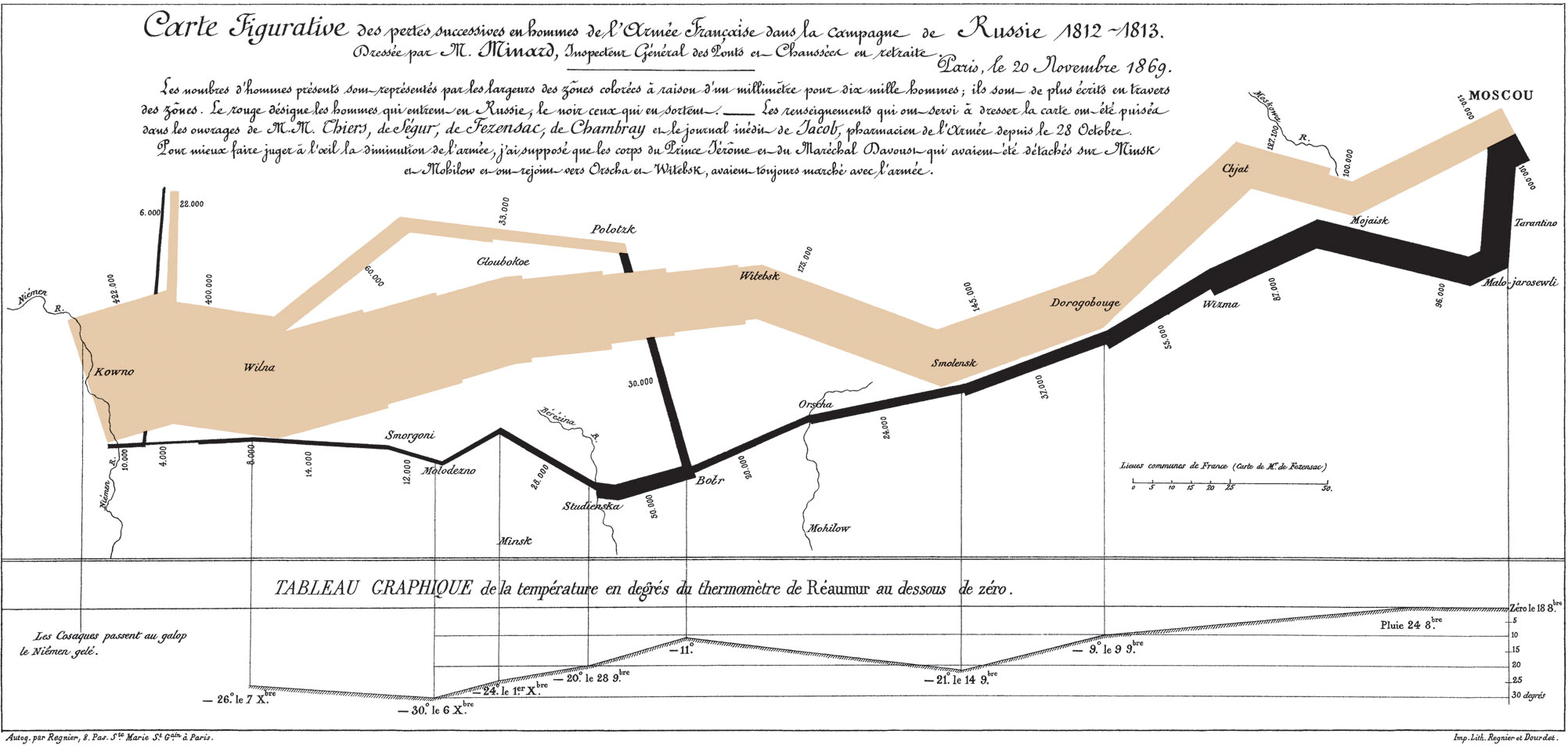
Charles Joseph Minard's Carte Figurative illustrates facts related to Napoleon's 1812 Russian campaign.

Visual literacy is the ability to interpret, negotiate, and make meaning from information presented in the form of an image, extending the meaning of literacy, which commonly signifies interpretation of a written or printed text. Visual literacy is based on the idea that pictures can be "read" and that meaning can be discovered through a process of reading.

== Historical background ==
The notion of visual literacy has been around for quite some time. Classical and Medieval theories of memory and learning, for instance, placed a strong emphasis on how the visual format of words and lies affected the ordering of information in the mind. During the Enlightenment new emphasis was placed on training the senses through print and manuscript technologies in a way that benefitted the rising middle class. In addition to learning to read visual material like tables and figures, many schoolchildren learned how to write and draw in graphic patterns that made their notes more accessible and easier to access. By the nineteenth century visual literacy was a core component of the national educations systems that were emerging in Europe and North America, with educational reformers like Sir John Lubbock arguing for visual tools like diagrams and models to be used in the classroom.

== Modern visual literacy ==
Although there are previous well documented uses of the term "visual literacy" between the late 30s and early 60s, the term it is usually credited to John Debes, co-founder of the International Visual Literacy Association. In 1969 Debes offered a tentative definition of the concept: "Visual literacy refers to a group of vision-competencies a human being can develop by seeing and at the same time having and integrating other sensory experiences." A white paper drawn up in January 2004, defines visual literacy as "understanding how people perceive objects, interpret what they see, and what they learn from them". However, because multiple disciplines such as visual literacy in education, art history and criticism, rhetoric, semiotics, philosophy, information design, and graphic design make use of the term visual literacy, arriving at a common definition of visual literacy has been contested since its first appearance in professional publications.

Since technological advances continue to develop at an unprecedented rate, educators are increasingly promoting the learning of visual literacies as indispensable to life in the information age. Similar to linguistic literacy (meaning-making derived from written or oral human language) commonly taught in schools, most educators would agree that literacy in the 21st century has a wider scope. Educators are recognizing the importance of helping students develop visual literacies in order to survive and communicate in a highly complex world.

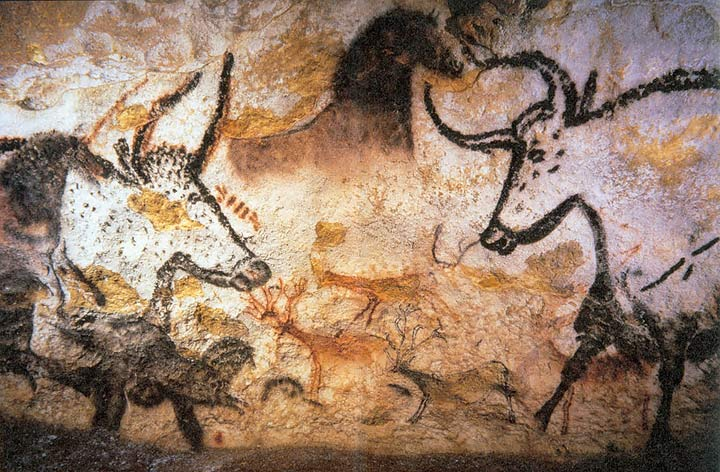
Lascaux Cave painting

Many scholars from the New London Group such as Courtney Cazden, James Gee, Gunther Kress, and Allan Luke advocate against the dichotomy of visual literacy versus linguistic literacy. Instead, they stress the necessity of accepting the co-presence of linguistic literacies and visual literacies as interacting and interlacing modalities which complement one another in the meaning making process.

Visual literacy is not limited to modern mass media and new technologies. The graphic novel Understanding Comics by Scott McCloud discusses the history of narrative in visual media. Also, animal drawings in ancient caves, such as the one in Lascaux, France, are early forms of visual literacy. Hence, even though the name visual literacy itself as a label dates to the 1960s, the concept of reading signs and symbols is prehistoric.

Visual literacy is the ability to evaluate, apply, or create conceptual visual representations. Skills include the evaluation of advantages and disadvantages of visual representations, to improve shortcomings, to use them to create and communicate knowledge, or to devise new ways of representing insights. The didactic approach consists of rooting visualization in its application contexts, i.e. giving the necessary critical attitude, principles, tools and feedback to develop their own high-quality visualization formats for specific problems (problem-based learning). The commonalities of good visualization in diverse areas, and exploration of the specificities of visualization in the field of specialization (through real-life case studies).

Visual literacy standards for teaching in higher education were adopted by the Association of College & Research Libraries in 2011. They were "developed over a period of 19 months, informed by current literature, shaped by input from multiple communities and organizations, reviewed by individuals from over 50 institutions, and approved by 3 ACRL committees and the ACRL Board of Directors".

== Education ==
There are many different formats of visual literacy and also many different ways of teaching students how to interpret visual literacy. Questions to be asked when looking at visuals can be "What is going on in this photograph?" and "What comes to mind when you first look at this photograph?". This allows students to begin the analyzing process. When looking at visuals, students should be able to see, understand, think, create and communicate graphically. In order to do all, the student must always carefully observe.

Film director Martin Scorsese emphasizes how children should begin developing visual literacy skills at an early age. This involves exploring how ideas and emotions are expressed and the use of lighting to create an emotional or physiological point. He explains how there is a need for children to understand these concepts. Visual literacy is taught in many schools and is becoming a more popular subject throughout the years. With technology, images and visual presentations are flourishing more than ever.

== See also ==
- Advertising
- Art criticism
- Chartjunk
- Comics studies
- Educational animation
- Educational technology
- Edward Tufte
- Information graphics
- Information literacies
- Multiliteracy
- New Epoch Notation Painting
- Object literacy
- Propaganda
- Transliteracy
- Visual literacy in education
- Visual narrative
- Visual rhetoric
- Visual semiotics
