= Robert Blackburn (artist) =

African American visual artist (1920–2003)

- Born: December 10, 1920; Summit, New Jersey, U.S.
- Died: April 21, 2003 (aged 82); New York City, New York, U.S.
- Education: Art Students League of New York
- Employer: National Academy of Design
- Known for: Robert Blackburn Printmaking Workshop
- Awards: MacArthur Fellow (1992)

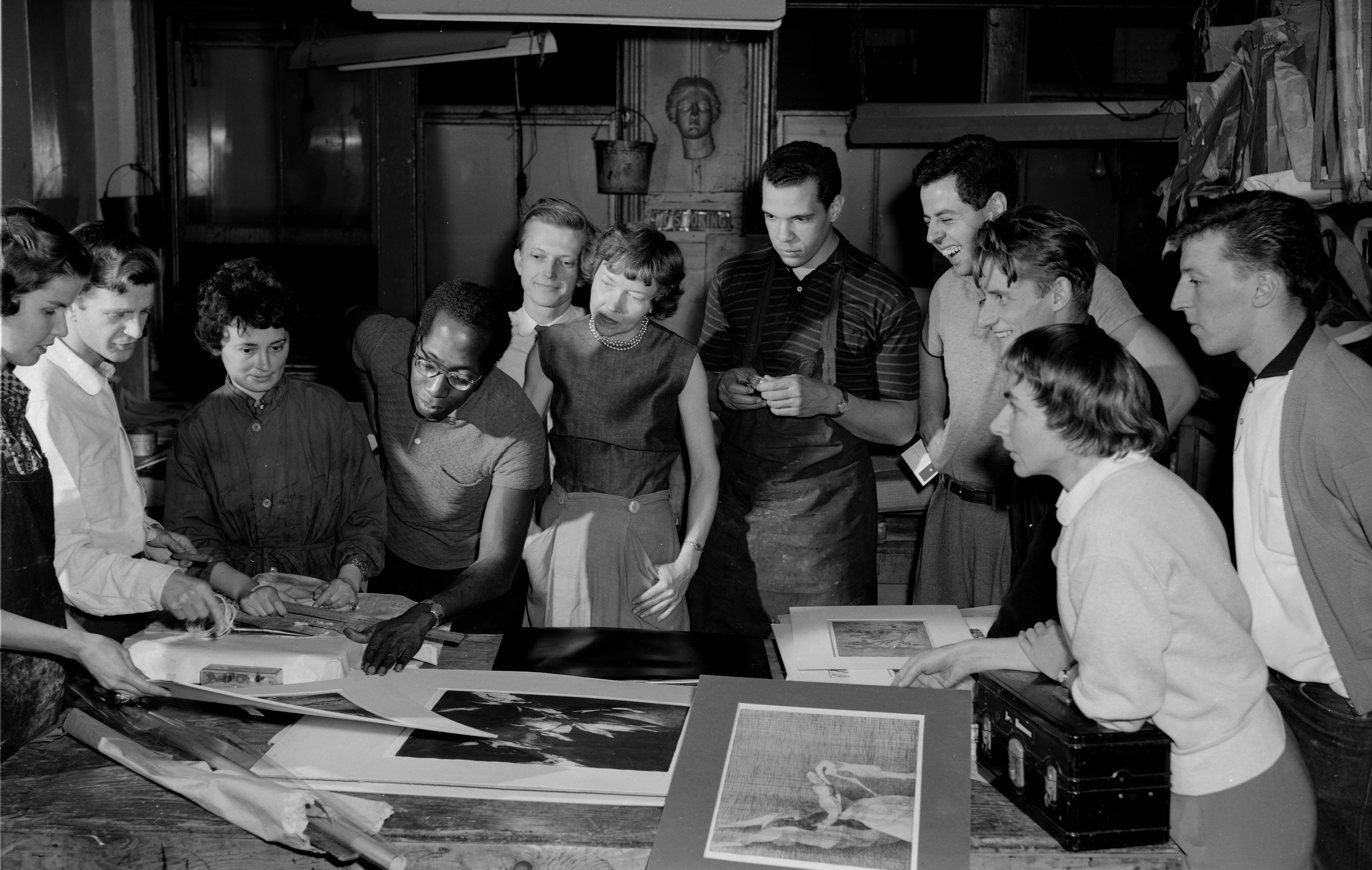
Blackburn and students in the workshop.

Robert Hamilton Blackburn (December 12, 1920 – April 21, 2003) was an African-American artist, teacher, and master printmaker.

== Early life and education ==
Blackburn was born in Summit, New Jersey, to Janet Chambers and Robert Archeball Blackburn, who were from Jamaica, and he grew up in Harlem, where his family moved when he was seven years old. Shortly after moving, his parents separated and the family underwent difficult financial times. Blackburn's mother encouraged his artistic talents, but his father discouraged him. At the age of 13, he began attending classes at the Harlem Arts Community Center operated by the Works Progress Administration's Federal Art Project, studying with Charles Alston and Augusta Savage, among others. At the Harlem Art Community Center Blackburn met Ronald Joseph, who was his classmate. Blackburn credited his work at the WPA for the interest he had in working collaboratively throughout the rest of his career.

Blackburn studied lithography and other printmaking techniques with Riva Helfond, who taught him how to operate the press, process, and prepare stones, based on simple techniques. He frequented the Uptown Community Workshop, a gathering place for black artists and writers such as Langston Hughes, Richard Wright and Jacob Lawrence. Blackburn worked at the Workshop as a monitor, running errands for teachers. This role allowed him to meet artists such as Romare Bearden, Aaron Douglas, and Jacob Lawrence.

Blackburn attended P.S. 139 and then Frederick Douglass Junior High School (1932–36), where his English teacher was Countee Cullen. Starting in 1936, he went to DeWitt Clinton High School in the Bronx, where he worked on the literary magazine The Magpie as a writer and artist along with peer James Baldwin. He graduated in 1940.

From early prints that portrayed cityscapes and figures on abstract backgrounds, Blackburn moved into more abstract work. From 1940 to 1943, a work scholarship to the Art Students League made it possible for him to study painting with Vaclav Vytlacil and lithography with Will Barnet, who became his friend. At the Art Students League, Blackburn won a School Arts League Award and an Art Students League Working Scholarship for study. Between 1943 and 1948 he supported himself with difficulty with arts-related freelance work, producing maps, charts and other graphics. Blackburn was also later able to study at Stanley William Hayter's influential Atelier 17 in New York, an experience that contributed to his desire to open his own print shop.

== Career ==
In 1947, Robert Blackburn established the Printmaking Workshop, an 8,000-square-foot (740 m^{2}) loft at 114 West 17th Street in New York City. When it first opened, the workshop's program included evening classes, an open studio working area, and print shops where artists could carry out their own experimentation. In the early 1950s, Blackburn and Barnet produced a suite of Barnet's lithographs that were a technical tour de force, requiring up to seventeen colors and multiple stones in the printing process. During 1953 and 1954, Blackburn traveled throughout Europe.

Blackburn was famously generous to other artists who came through the Workshop and fostered an atmosphere of openness to diversity. Among the many artists who have worked with Blackburn at the Printmaking Workshop are Elizabeth Catlett, Charles White, Nadine M. DeLawrence, Vivian Browne, Emma Amos, Otto Neals, Felipe Molina Mejia, Ernest Crichlow, Samella Lewis, John Biggers, Ed Clark, Mavis Pusey, Vincent Dacosta Smith, Camille Billops, Melvin Edwards, Mildred Thompson, Benny Andrews, Betty Blayton, Aminah Robinson, Romare Bearden, Kay Brown, Dindga McCannon, Leonora Carrington, Roy DeCarava, Sue Fuller, Eldzier Cortor, Faith Ringgold, Betye Saar, Faith Wilding and Jack Whitten. He was especially close with Romare Bearden, and is credited with introducing him to the collagraph process. The two met at meetings of the artist group 306. His commitment to sponsoring minority and third-world students and developing community programs profoundly influenced younger printmakers, who seeded similar workshops around the United States and internationally.

In 1956, when the Printmaking Workshop struggled financially and faced the threat of closing, fellow artist and printmaker Chaim Koppelman devised a means to save the studio by transforming it into a cooperative with annual dues. Blackburn credited Koppelman with saving the Workshop, and in 1992, Blackburn, Barnet, and Koppelman received a New York Artists Equity Award for their "dedicated service to the printmaking community."

Blackburn's most productive period as an artist and printmaker was between the late 1950s and the early 1970s. During this period he produced a large body of abstract still lifes and color compositions, mostly in lithography. In the 1970s, Blackburn turned away from lithography and began producing woodcuts, as well as some monotypes and intaglios.

Blackburn also served between 1957 and 1963 as the first master printer for Tatyana Grosman's Universal Limited Art Editions (ULAE), where he produced editions for such artists as Helen Frankenthaler, Grace Hartigan, Jasper Johns, Robert Rauschenberg, and Larry Rivers. He returned to primarily working at the Printmaking Workshop on a full-time basis after a printing accident in 1962, in which a stone by Robert Rauschenberg was broken, shaking Blackburn's confidence.

In 1971, Blackburn put in place a board of trustees to help run the Printmaking Workshop and incorporated it as a nonprofit. Over the years the Workshop had accumulated a large collection of artists' prints, and efforts to find a permanent home for them were led by Deborah Cullen, who met Blackburn while a student at the School of Visual Arts in 1985 and was the collection's curator between 1993 and 1996. By 1997, over 2,500 of these works had been deposited with the Library of Congress in Washington D.C. Smaller selections of the Workshop's prints have been placed with the Schomburg Center for Research in Black Culture and El Museo Del Barrio, New York.

During the 1970s, he participated in a community art space called Communications Village operated by printmaker Benjamin Leroy Wigfall in Kingston, NY. Andrews made prints with the help of printer assistants who had been taught printmaking by Wigfall, and he exhibited there.

Over the years, Blackburn taught at the National Academy of Design (1949), the New School for Social Research (1950-1968), Cooper Union, New York University (1965-1971), School of Visual Arts (1967-1971), Pratt Institute (1974-1975), Columbia University (beginning in 1970), and Rutgers University (1977-1979). He founded the Experimental Printmaking Institute (EPI) at Lafayette College in 1996, to work innovatively and experimentally with students. In 1981, Blackburn was elected to the National Academy of Design as an Associate member, and he became a full member in 1994. In 1987, he received the Skowhegan School of Painting and Sculpture Award for having "contributed significantly to the cultural life of New York City." In 1988, Blackburn and the nonprofit Printmaking Workshop received a Governor's Art Award from the New York State Council on the Arts. He also received a MacArthur Fellowship in 1992. Blackburn was a long time member of the Society of American Graphic Artists. He lived in the Chelsea Hotel later in life, and died in New York City.

On September 18, 2003, the Great Hall of Cooper Union in New York City held an exhibition and memorial to honor Blackburn's work. Blackburn's early work at DeWitt Clinton High School, where classmates included artists Burton Hasen, David Finn and Harold Altman, was exhibited at the Metropolitan Museum in 2009.

In 2021, the Detroit Institute of Arts showcased his work in its exhibit Robert Blackburn & Modern American Printmaking. "The exhibition contains more than 75 works, including lithographs, woodcuts, intaglio prints, and watercolors by Blackburn and the artists with whom he collaborated, including Elizabeth Catlett, Grace Hartigan, Robert Rauschenberg, and Charles White."
