= Media theory of composition =

Commonly called new media theory or media-centered theory of composition, stems from the rise of computers as word processing tools. Media theorists now also examine the rhetorical strengths and weakness of different media, and the implications these have for literacy, author, and reader.

== New media defined ==
The meaning of the term 'new media' can be confusing and debated over. At times extended to mean any sort of media that is not purely written-text-based, it generally refers to any medium that is technologically 'advanced' from pure text. The broadness of the term is useful in that it allows for the multiple modes that can be encompassed by this definition, instead of being focused on the technical aspect that the term 'digital' would invite. With this in mind, though, terms like 'digital', 'hyper-textual', 'interactive', 'simulated', 'virtual', and 'networked' can often be helpful when thinking about what constitutes new media. However, there is often a false dichotomy drawn between the 'analogue' media and the 'new' media; media theory invites re-mediation of texts, which often result in a mix of mediums. Gunther Kress remarks on the new responsibilities of writers: "In the new theory of representation, in the present technological context of electronic, multimodal, multimedia textual production, the task of text-makers is that of complex orchestration. Further, individuals are now seen as remakers, transformers, of sets of representational resources... ."

== Theoretical construct ==
Noted scholar in the field, Cynthia Selfe, has frequently commented on the exigency of incorporating new media in the writing classroom, noting its ability to make students rhetorically aware of the arguments that they commonly take for granted based on medium. She states, "Composition teachers, language arts teachers, and other literacy specialists need to recognize that the relevance of technology in the English studies disciplines is not simply a matter of helping students work effectively with communication software and hardware, but, rather, also a matter of helping them to understand and to be able to assess – to pay attention to – the social, economic, and pedagogical implications of new communication technologies and technological initiatives that affect their lives."

Richard Ohmann extends this argument, saying, "Adults ignorant of computers will soon be as restricted as those who today are unable to read. Software will become the language of the future, and the dominant intellectual asset of the human race, so that an understanding of software will be a primary component of literacy in the electronic age".

Holding intersections with rhetorical theory, new media theory focuses on how different mediums work rhetorically within various contexts. It subscribes to Marshall McLuhan's coined phrase "the medium is the message", or rather, that a message's content is just as important as the medium that delivers it in affecting how the message is received. A large amount of new media theory's focus is also on how different mediums generate different thinking; the theory proposes that new mediums produce specific (often unique) rhetorical moves like multi-threaded thought processes through the use of interactive texts. Related to this, patterns of organization and production are topics of emphasis for new media theory, especially when thinking about the commonly non-sequential or thinking and writing of new media, particularly through the use of hyperlinks. Gunther Kress says about the complexity of new media composition, "But this one person now has to understand the semiotic potentials of each mode–sound, visual, speech–and orchestrate them to accord with his or her design. Multimedia production requires high levels of competence based on knowledge of the operation of different modes, and highly developed design abilities to produce complex semiotic "texts."

Media theory focuses on the effects that can come from utilizing new media, like new textual experiences and new ways of representing the world. One effect is the changing relationship between subjects and technologies, especially in relation to identity and community.

== Research ==
The earliest research that can be considered part of media theory involved the use of computers as word processors. However, with the advent of applications like HyperCard for the Apple Macintosh, the focus in media research shifted to hypertext's implications in the writing classroom.

Much research has been done regarding technological literacy, and questions of literacy in general. Richard Ohmann, as early as 1985, questions the focus on technological literacy appearing in schools at the time. Insisting that technological literacy is tied to socioeconomic class, Ohmann, and others like him began to research the possibility for educational ostracism because of a lack of access to technological tools. This contrasts starkly with much of the utopian visions of the technological classroom that others exhibited.

Current research is being conducted multimodal composition, broadening composition to encompass video, video games, music, and other interactive media Digital Media.

== Authorship ==
Identity and the construction of such is an area of particular focus for new media theory. Individuals can control how they are represented online through personalized avatars and profiles, and the rhetorical moves behind this are often explored. Identity is an important aspect of authorship in many new media writings in this manner, then, especially in situations like Internet forums.

Many instances of new media have difficulty controlling authorship, though, and new media theory does not always view this as a bad thing. Digital medias are in a constant state of flux (versus the relative fixity of traditional text) because several transformations may occur. For instance, in the case of email, messages may be replied to or forwarded several times, during which times previous messages may be revised or edited by various parties. Technologies that allow for simultaneous authoring of texts also produce this effect.

Authorship is further complicated by the refashioning of analogue texts or the "remixing" of several new media texts. Jay Bolter says, "In the new theory of representation, in the present technological context of electronic, multimodal, multimedia textual production, the task of text-makers is that of complex orchestration. Further, individuals are now seen as remakers, transformers, of sets of representational resources."

Those involved in new media theories have often needed to redefine "author" in the context of new media. Some theorists draw a difference between the authors of analogue texts as people who produce texts that readers interpret; in contrast, those who produce new media texts are seen as being in better alignment with the term "experience designers", because they create spaces within which readers make their own paths. This is particularly true for interactive and immersive texts. This produces even more debate over who is seen as an author, because in many new media texts, the reader plays a dual role of consumer and producer.

== Teaching methods and pedagogical basis ==
Media theory focuses on the agency that composing in new media can give writers. It is important not to simply add in new media as a problematic addendum to analogue writing; instead, teachers can take advantage of these "new" means by calling students to become both consumers or critics of new media as well as producers, as technology's role in society becomes ever more prominent. Giving students the resources to take part in discourses around and through new media gives them the power and agency to act in this digital world.

The agency gained through new media composition also provides a basis for social change. Gunther Kress remarks on the potential for teaching design via new media composition in the classroom: Design takes for granted competence in the use of resources, but beyond that it requires the orchestration and remaking of these resources in the services of frameworks and models that express the maker's intentions in shaping the social and cultural environment. While critique looks at the present through the means of past production, design shapes the future through deliberate deployment of representational resources in the designer's interest.

Teachers cite the ease of which students pick up on the techniques of composition and analysis of new media. The visually saturated and technologically heavy society of today means that students and writers will need to question the communications and compositions around them as rhetorical moves integral to the culture students live in. Their familiarity with and knowledge of new media often results in positive, conscious appropriation of media, and opens the door for discussions of repurposing within culture. Jay Bolter and Richard Grusin say: No medium today, and certainly no single media event, seems to do its cultural work in isolation from other social and economic forces. What is new about new media comes from the particular ways in which they refashion older media and the ways in which older media refashion themselves to answer the challenges of new media.

One potentially useful method of teaching composition with media theory in mind is through the use of online classrooms. Massive Open Online Courses (MOOCs) and Online Writing Labs (OWLs) are becoming increasingly popular, especially with distance learning. These educational formats also typically deal with analogue texts, but provide technologically based resources for this composition process via digital feedback and revision techniques.

Media theory has particular potential for teaching basic writers or students whose native language is not English. As a "literacy" that "translates" better across languages and demographics, new media can serve to engage students who were previously uninterested in composition, as well as allow these students to feel like they have more expertise or agency in the composing process. Furthermore, it allows for more creativity and exploration of rhetorical power in composition as students learn the semiotic power of various modes of discourse through technology.

== Intersections with other composition theories ==
Because media theory focuses so much on specific, often technical aspects of writing, it has much room for overlap, and facilitates other theoretical composition pedagogies.

For instance, Writing Across the Curriculum (commonly known as WAC) focuses on the different ideologies, paradigms, and standards between various disciplines, especially when it comes to writing and how these play out within writing. Thus, WAC recommends an approach to teaching writing that emphasizes these differences and the rhetorical awareness that is needed to write to varying audiences. Media theory works well with WAC because it, too, emphasizes different and multiple literacies. Not only does it emphasize a multi-modal approach to writing, but it also emphasizes the fact that the writer will have to be aware of different audience's familiarity with technology. Furthermore, WAC can easily be combined with media theory because technology and digital writing are becoming more popular in all disciplines, so understanding the differences that come with various fields could potentially interact with the implications of using digital composition instead of traditional print.

Another theory that media theory is conducive to in composition is collaborative learning theory. Typically, this theory focuses on the construction of knowledge as a social act. Media theory aligns well with collaborative learning because, with the advancement of technology, writing can easily accommodate multiple authors. This can be exemplified through something as simple as an online forum, in which writers converse through text to come to conclusions. Another example is Wikipedia, the online encyclopedia where authorship is relatively open to the public, so various writers may inform others of their knowledge and build on others' to create a constantly evolving definition and explanation of a certain topic.

Media theory also works well with critical pedagogy and feminist theories of composition. These theories challenge traditional notions of hierarchies in relation to certain social groups, like race or gender, and how this affects writing. When in practice, media theory can break down hierarchies in several ways. The first way is tied directly to writing as a product. Critical and feminist theories value texts written in non-traditional ways (for example, narrative essay as a "feminine" writing style versus thesis-driven essay as a "masculine" writing style) and texts written by minorities. Media theory breaks down the hegemony that "pure text" has over other modalities by utilizing "non-traditional" methods and modes of writing through the use of technology. The second way media theory in practice breaks down hierarchies is tied to writing as a process. There is a democratization to media theory because everyone is involved in the creation and consumption of a text because of common features like public access and interactivity. In terms of concrete pedagogy, Massively Open Online Classrooms (MOOCs) work to break down hierarchies by encouraging learning in an informal setting with partially anonymous users, which potentially allows for minorities to let their voices be heard without worrying about discrimination.

== Critiques ==
A main critique of media theory in practice deals with time constraints. Many First-Year Composition teachers complain that there is not enough time in the course to teach digital writing in addition to "regular" writing. This often results in the addition of new media production as a last-minute addendum, "as a strategy for adding relevance or interest to a required course. Only rarely does that call address students as producers as well as consumers or critics". Related to this, teachers are also frequently concerned that they do not have the ability or knowledge required to teach writing with new media and multi-modality to students because they are often unfamiliar with constantly evolving technologies.

A separate criticism is that new media use allows for more prevalent plagiarism. As more information is available on the Internet, it is much easier to simply "copy-paste" data into a new format. Furthermore, the questionable authorship of many digital texts complicates things both in terms of writing and citing works. Multi-media works are especially subject to concern over criticism as appropriation and remixing are rampant and even encouraged in composition classrooms and as debates over SOPA occur.

Many word processing programs have also been seen to reinforce norms and hierarchies. For instance, the commonly used spelling and grammar checkers of certain programs can be seen as possibly halting the natural progression of language and the creative use of it by encouraging writers to stay within the realm of standard vernaculars. Furthermore, some cite the highly class-based symbolic nature of many digital word processing systems.

Hierarchies are also potentially reaffirmed with implications of the word "new" in "new media". While media theory aims to expand writers' view of modality, a society caught up in modernism is prone to believe that "newness" will result in social progress, as fostered in this case by technological advances, by equating "new" and "better". Furthermore, class-based issues of access may serve to reinforce existing social structures; as those who are unable to access advanced technology fall behind in composition-based technological capabilities, they will be less able to compete in the job market and are likely to reaffirm the separation between classes. This is especially true in K–12 writing programs, as there are often economic differences between students and school districts. However, issues of access are disputed as technology becomes more available to the general public. Patricia Fitzsimmons-Hunter and Charles Moran, aware of these issues of access and their inevitable consequences, notably use technology that is friendlier to class-differences: "We consider as our goal the integration of low-end, relatively affordable technology into the lives and work of those who are, or see themselves as being, left behind by the pace of the technological change: "roadkill," to use a popular contemporary metaphor, on the information superhighway."

One of the most cited shortcomings of new media composition is that many teachers are unsure how to assess the writing. Oftentimes, teachers are only familiar with the standards that traditional text is held to. Texts written in new media encounter different rhetorical situations and contexts, and thus do not fit the standards that teachers are familiar with. Furthermore, these new texts often combine text with non-textual modes of communication, like the visual or auditory, making the situation for grading a "written work" even more complex.

== See also ==
- Cybertext
- Digital literacy
- Digital rhetoric
- Digital studio
- Jonathan Alexander (professor)
- Lisa Nakamura
- New media
- Rhetorical velocity
- Richard Lanham
