= Multiliteracy =

Aspect of media studies

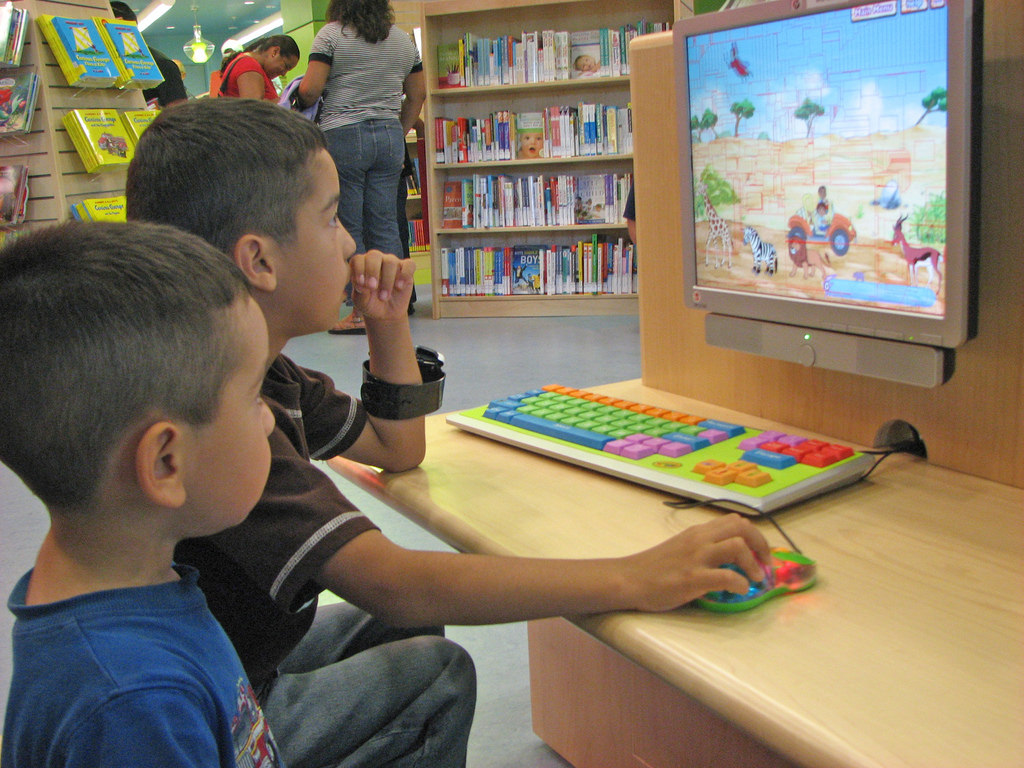
Young students practise computational thinking while playing games.

Multiliteracy (plural: multiliteracies) is an approach to literacy theory and pedagogy coined in the mid-1990s by the New London Group. The approach is characterized by two key aspects of literacy – linguistic diversity and multimodal forms of linguistic expressions and representation. It was coined in response to two major changes in the globalized environment. One such change was the growing linguistic and cultural diversity due to increased transnational migration. The second major change was the proliferation of new mediums of communication due to advancement in communication technologies e.g. the internet, multimedia, and digital media. As a scholarly approach, multiliteracy focuses on the new "literacy" developing in response to changes in how people communicate globally, driven by technological shifts and the interplay between different cultures and languages.

Multiliteracy refers to the ability to understand and effectively use multiple forms of literacy and communication in a variety of contexts. This includes traditional literacy (reading and writing), digital literacy (using technology and digital media), visual literacy (interpreting images and visuals), and other forms of communication. It goes beyond traditional notions of literacy, which typically focus on reading and writing skills, to encompass a broader range of literacies associated with the digital age.

== Overview ==
As a pedagogical approach, multiliteracy is based on the New London Group's proposition, which calls for a balanced classroom design with four key aspects: situated practice, overt instruction, critical framing, and transformed practice. Situated practice connects classroom topics to real-world experiences, building on students' personal experiences. Overt instruction focuses on student conceptualization and scaffolding of new concepts to provide focus for new concepts. Critical framing focuses on analyzing the sociocultural contexts in which a concept, literature, or text was developed. Transformed practice uses the previous three aspects to encourage reflection and apply these teachings in a new context to achieve a personal goal.

Key aspects of multiliteracy include:

- Multimodal literacy: In the digital age, communication often involves multiple modes, including text, images, videos, and interactive elements.
- Digital literacy: This is a core component of multiliteracy.
- Media literacy: Multiliteracy involves being able to critically analyze and interpret media messages, whether they come from traditional sources like newspapers and television or from new media such as social networks and online news sites.
- Information literacy: In an era of information overload, being information literate is essential. It means knowing how to find, evaluate, and use information effectively and ethically.
- Cultural literacy: Understanding and appreciating cultural differences and diverse perspectives is a vital aspect of multiliteracy.
- Critical literacy: Critical literacy skills enable individuals to analyze and question information, sources, and underlying assumptions.
- Visual literacy: In an age of visual communication, being visually literate involves interpreting and creating visual elements, such as images, infographics, and data visualizations.
- Intertextuality: Multiliteracy recognizes the interconnected nature of texts, media, and communication.
- Rhetorical awareness: Being aware of how communication is constructed and tailored for specific audiences and purposes is important in multiliteracy.

== Applications ==
Two major topics demonstrate how multiliteracies can be used. First, as the world becomes smaller, communication across cultures and languages is increasingly necessary. The use of the English language is also changing. While English may seem like the common global language, different dialects and subcultures speak different Englishes. The way English is spoken in Australia, South Africa, India, or any other country differs from how it is spoken in the original English-speaking country, the UK.

The second way to understand multiliteracies is how technology and multimedia are changing how we communicate. These days, text and speech are no longer the only main ways to communicate. The definition of media is expanding to include text combined with sound and images, as seen in movies, billboards, almost any site on the internet, and television. All these ways of communication require the ability to understand a multimedia world.

The New London Group's formulation of "A Pedagogy of Multiliteracies" expanded the focus of literacy from reading and writing to understanding multiple discourses and forms of representation in public and professional domains. The new literacy pedagogy was developed to meet students' learning needs and help them navigate these altered technological, cultural, and linguistically diverse communities. The concept of multiliteracies has been applied within various contexts and includes oral vernacular genres, visual literacies, information literacy, emotional literacy, and scientific multiliteracies and numeracy.

=== To real-world contexts ===
Because of changes in the world, especially globalisation and increased immigration, a debate has arisen about how students are taught and learn in school. English, and all subjects, should evolve to incorporate multimodal ways of communication. The New London Group (1996) proposes teaching all representations of meaning, including linguistic, visual, audio, spatial, and gestural, which fall under the category of multimodal. A pedagogy of multiliteracies includes a balanced classroom design of Situated Practice, Overt Instruction, Critical Framing and Transformed Practice. Students need to draw on their own experiences and semiotic literacy practices to represent and communicate meaning.

Changes in education affect learning processes, and how learning processes are applied affects the use of multiliteracies (Selber, 2004). These include the functional, critical, and rhetorical skills that are applied in diverse fields and disciplines.

Educational pedagogies, including purpose-driven education, integrate multiliteracies by encouraging student learning through exploration of their passions using their senses, technology, vernaculars, and alternative forms of communication.

== New London Group ==
The New London Group is a group of ten academics who met for a week in September 1994 in New London, New Hampshire, United States, to develop a new literacy pedagogy that would address concerns facing educators, as the existing literacy pedagogy did not meet students' learning needs. Their focus was on replacing the existing monolingual, monocultural, and standardized literacy pedagogy that prioritized reading and writing with a pedagogy that used multiple modes of meaning-making. They emphasised the use of multiple modes of communication, languages, and multiple Englishes to reflect the impact of new technologies and linguistic and cultural diversity, instead of developing competence in a single national language and standardized form of English. The ten academics brought to the discussion their expertise and personal experience from different national and professional contexts. Courtney Cazden from the United States has worked in classroom discourse and multilingual teaching and learning. Bill Cope from Australia, on literacy pedagogy and linguistic diversity, and new technologies of representation and communication; Mary Kalantzis from Australia, on experimental social education and citizenship education; Norman Fairclough from the United Kingdom, on critical discourse analysis, social practices and discourse, and the relationship between discursive change and social and cultural change; Gunther Kress from the United Kingdom, on social semiotics, visual literacy, discourse analysis, and multimodal literacy; James Gee from the United States, on psycholinguistics, sociolinguistics, and language and literacy; Allan Luke from Australia on critical literacy and applied linguistics; Carmen Luke from Australia, on feminism and critical pedagogy; Sarah Michaels from the United States, on classroom discourse; and Martin Nakata on indigenous education and higher education curriculum. The article "A Pedagogy of Multiliteracies: Designing Social Futures", published in 1996, documents the New London Group's "manifesto" of literacy pedagogy that is recommended for use in educational institutions, in the community, and within organizations.

== "A Pedagogy of Multiliteracies" ==
The multiliteracies pedagogical approach involves four key aspects: situated practice, critical framing, overt instruction, and transformed practice. Situated practice involves learning that is grounded in students' own life experiences. Critical framing supports students in questioning common sense assumptions found within discourses. Overt instruction is the direct teaching of "metalanguages" in order to help learners understand the components of expressive forms or grammars. Transformed practice is where learners engage in situated practices based in new understandings of literacy practices.

=== Situated practice ===
Situated practice, originally formulated by the New London Group (1996) as one of the related components of multiliteracies pedagogy, is constituted by immersion in meaningful practices within a community of learners who are culturally and linguistically diversified. It involves situating meaning making in real-world contexts and taking account of the affective and sociocultural needs of learners. This aspect of the curriculum needs to draw on the lifeworld experiences of students, as well as their out-of-school communities and discourses, as an integral part of the learning experience. In order to apply situated practice to curriculum realities, Cope and Kalantzis (2009) reframed it as "experiencing" (p. 184). They believe human cognition is situated and contextual, and meanings are grounded in the real world of patterns of experience, action and subjective interest. Experiencing takes two forms.

- Experiencing the known–learners bring their own, invariably diverse knowledge, experiences, interests and life-texts to the learning context. Activities of experiencing the known involve showing or talking about something familiar: listen, view, watch and visit, reflecting on learners' own experiences, interests and perspectives (Cope & Kalantzis, 2015).
- Experiencing the new–learners are immersed in new situations or information, observing or taking part in something that is new or unfamiliar, but within the zone of intelligibility and close to their own life-worlds. For example, teachers introduce something new but which makes sense by immersion in experiments, field trips and investigations in projects (Cope & Kalantzis, 2015).

Situated practice/experiencing connects with a tradition called 'authentic pedagogy'. Authentic pedagogy was first formulated as a direct counterpoint to didactic pedagogy in the twentieth century, initially through the work of John Dewey in the United States and Maria Montessori in Italy. It focuses on the learner's own meanings, the texts that are relevant to them in their everyday lives. When it comes to reading and writing, authentic literacy pedagogy promotes a process of natural language growth that begins when a child learns to speak, with a focus on internalized understanding rather than the formalities of rules. It is learner-centered and aims to provide space for self-expression.

However, the New London Group (1996) points out limitations to situated practice. First, while situated learning can lead to mastery in practice, learners immersed in rich and complex practices can vary significantly from each other and situated practice does not necessarily lead to conscious control and awareness of what one knows and does. Second, situated practice does not necessarily create learners who can critique what they are learning in terms of historical, cultural, political, ideological, or value-centered relations. Third, there is the question of putting knowledge into action. Learners might be incapable of reflexively enacting their knowledge in practice. Therefore, they clarify that situated practice must be supplemented by other components and powerful learning arises from weaving between situated practice, overt instruction, critical framing and transformed practice in a purposeful way.

=== Critical framing ===
Critical framing in multiliteracies requires an investigation of the socio-cultural contexts and purposes of learning and designs of meaning. Cope and Kalantzis (2001) discuss this in the context of our increasingly diverse and globally interconnected lives where the forces of migration, multiculturalism, and global economic integration intensify the processes of change. The act of meaning-making is also diversifying as digital interfaces level the playing field.

Mills (2009) discusses how multiliteracies can help us go beyond heritage print texts that reproduce and sustain dominant cultural values by creating affordances for thinking about textual practices that construct and produce culture. Another dimension of this critical framing may be extended to the diverse types and purposes of literacy in contemporary society. The traditional curricula operates on various rules of inclusion and exclusion in the hierarchical ordering of textual practices, often dismissing text types such as picture books or popular fiction. Similarly, items like blogs, emails, websites, visual literacies, and oral discourses may often be overlooked as "inferior literacies". In excluding them from mainstream literacy practices, we become prone to disenfranchise groups and may lose out on opportunities to sensitize learners to consider underlying issues of power, privilege, and prejudice, both in terms of identifying these in societal practices, as well as in questioning dominant discourses that normalize these. Mills also states how some scholars such as Unsworth (2006a, 2006b) and Mackey (1998) suggest an increased blurring of 'popular culture' and 'quality literature' facilitated by classical literature made available in electronic formats and supported by online communities and forums.

In addition to acknowledging increased socio-cultural contextualization and diversification of text-types, multiliteracies pedagogies also enable us to critically frame and reconceptualize traditional notions of writing, calling into question issues of authority, authorship, power, and knowledge. Domingo, Jewitt, and Kress (2014) address these concepts through a study of template designs on websites and blogs that empowers the readers through non-linear readings paths, with the modular layout allowing them to choose their own reading paths. They also discuss the varying affordances of different modes and how writing become just one part of the multimodal ensemble.

Multiliteracies transcend conventional print literacies and the centrality of cultures that have historically extolled it, offering much scope for arts-based approaches in decolonizing initiatives (Flicker et al., 2014) or reflexive visual methodologies in situated contexts (Mitchell, DeLange, Moletsane, Stuart, & Buthelezi, 2005). However, in so far as access to digital tools and infrastructures is concerned, we still need to take into account issues of agency, capital, socioeconomic status, and digital epistemologies (Prinsloo & Rowsell, 2012).

=== Overt instruction ===
==== Original view ====
In the original formulation of the New London Group, overt instruction was one of the major dimensions of literacy pedagogy that was identified. The original view of overt instruction includes the teachers and other experts' supporting students through scaffolding and focusing the students on the important features of their experiences and activities within the community of learners (Cope & Kalantzis, 2000, p. 33). Cope and Kalantiz argue teachers and other experts allow the learner to gain explicit information at times by building on and using what the learner already knows and has achieved. Overt instruction is not, as it is often misrepresented, direct transmission, drills, and rote learning. It includes the kinds of collaborative efforts between teacher and student in which the student can do a task that is much more complex than the task they can do individually. According to Cope and Kalantzis, "Overt Instruction introduces an often overlooked element-the connection of the element of the importance of contextualization of learning experiences to conscious understanding of elements of language meaning and design" (p. 116) Use of metalanguages, Cope and Kalantzis argue, is one of the key features of Overt Instruction. Metalanguages refer to "languages of reflective generalization that describe the form, content, and function of the discourses of practice" (p. 34).

==== Updated view ====
After applying overt instruction orientation to curriculum practices for around a decade, this dimension of literacy pedagogy was reframed and translated in the Learning by Design project into the 'knowledge process' of conceptualizing (Cope & Kalantzis, 2009, 2015). Conceptualizing involves "the development of abstract, generalizing concepts and theoretical synthesis of these concepts" (Cope & Kalantzis, 2015, p. 19). Using these Knowledge Processes, learners can categorize terms, and collect these into the mental models. Conceptualizing, according to Cope and Kalantzis (p. 19) occurs in two ways:

- Conceptualizing by naming-categorization is a knowledge process by means of which the learner learns to use abstract, generalizing terms. A concept not only names the particular; it also abstracts something general from that particular.
  Activity type: define terms, make a glossary, label a diagram, sort or categorize like or unlike things.
- Conceptualizing with theory-schematization is a knowledge process by means of which learners make generalizations and put the key terms together into interpretative framework. They build mental models, abstract frameworks and transferable disciplinary schemas (Cope & Kalantzis, 2009, p. 185).
  Activity type: draw a diagram, make a concept map, or write a summary, theory or formula which puts the concepts together

=== Transformed practice ===
Transformed practice, originally framed by the New London Group (1996) as part of the four components of multiliteracies pedagogy, is embedded in authentic learning, where activities are re-created according to the lifeworld of learners. Transformed practice is transfer in meaning-making practice, which involves applied learning, real-world meanings, communication in practice, and applying understanding gained from situated practice, overt instruction, and critical framing to a new context. Once learners are aware of how context affects their learning, the "theory becomes reflective practice" (The New London Group, 1996, p. 87). In other words, learners can reflect on what they have learned while they engage in reflective practice based on their personal goals and values in new contexts. For instance, learners design a personalized research project on a specific topic.

Transformed practice subsequently underwent reformation and was renamed "applying" as part of "knowledge processes" (Cope & Kalantzis, 2009, p. 184), formerly known as multiliteracy pedagogy. Applying is considered as the typical focus of the tradition of applied or competency-based learning (Cope & Kalantzis, 2015). While learners actively learn by applying experiential, conceptual or critical knowledge in the real world, learners act on the basis of knowing something of the world, and learning something new from the experience of acting. That is, applying occurs more or less unconsciously or incidentally everyday in the lifeworld, since learners are usually doing things and learning by doing them. Applying can occur in two ways:

- Applying appropriately concerns how knowledge is perceived in a typical or predictable way in a particular situation. For instance, meanings are expressed in a way that corresponds to the conventions of a semiotic or meaning-making setting (Cope & Kalantzis, 2015). Applying appropriately also involves the application of knowledge and understanding of the complexity of real-world situations. Learners then examine if they are valid. Examples of activities include writing, drawing, solving a problem, or behaving in the usual and expected manner in a real-world situation or simulation (Cope & Kalantzis, 2015).
- Applying creatively involves the way learners transform knowledge they have learned from a familiar context and use it in a different context, unfamiliar to learners. As applying creatively is related to being active in the innovative and creative world, learners' interests, experiences, and aspirations can be promoted. Examples of activities are taking an intellectual risk, applying knowledge to a different setting, suggesting a new problem, and translating knowledge into a different mix of modes of meaning (Cope & Kalantzis, 2015).

== See also ==
- Aesthetic Journalism (book)
- Comics studies
- Media literacy
- Visual literacy
