= Election law and voting rights under the second Trump administration =

The second Trump administration has issued executive orders and other presidential directives instituting federal department and agency actions that have impacted election administration by state governments, federal election security and campaign finance agencies, and offices within the U.S. Justice Department for enforcing voting rights protections. The administration's actions on election law and voting rights have occurred alongside the administration's targeting of political opponents and Republican Party efforts to disrupt voting after the 2024 presidential election. Election lawyers at the Brennan Center for Justice and Democracy Docket have described the administration's actions as election subversion, while surveys of U.S. political scientists conducted after Trump returned to office have found a consensus that the United States is transitioning towards illiberal democracy and competitive authoritarianism.

== Campaign finance ==
On February 7, 2025, Trump sent the chairwoman of the Federal Election Commission (FEC), Ellen Weintraub, a letter informing her she was fired, but she refused to leave, alleging the attempted removal was illegal. (Weintraub confirmed her firing in October 2025.) She had previously voted to investigate Trump over allegations of collusion between his political campaigns and associated super political action committees, as well as Russian interference in the 2016 United States elections. The commission had deadlocked on many cases involving Trump, with the three Republican commissioners voting against investigation. This action occurred when the FEC was planning adjudication for campaign finance complaints for the 2024 United States elections, especially those involving Elon Musk.

Also in February, Trump signed Executive Order 14215, which placed independent regulatory agencies, including the FEC under his control. The Democratic Party filed a federal lawsuit, claiming that the order violates the Federal Election Campaign Act and that employees of the Democratic Party's campaign groups worried that their strategies for fundraising and communication may lead to an FEC complaint against those groups. This lawsuit was dismissed in June 2025.

On April 30, Republican commissioner Allen Dickerson resigned from the FEC, leading to the commission being without a quorum. This situation prevents the agency from partaking in its usual activities such as voting on investigations, publishing advisory opinions or guidance, or enforcing campaign finance law violations. As of that day, Trump has not made any announcements for new commissioners. In October 2025, Republican Trey Trainor announced his resignation as commissioner, leaving the FEC with only two commissioners.

In July 2025, the Internal Revenue Service allowed for an exemption for religious organizations from the Johnson Amendment, allowing them to make political endorsements without penalty. Jeff Clements, the CEO of American Promise, warned of the risk of dark money and the further loss of trust in elections, while Diane Yentel, the leader of National Council of Nonprofits, viewed the move as being motivated by overhauling campaign finance laws.

== Election administration ==
Avatar of Donald J. Trump

Donald J. Trump
(@realDonaldTrump)
tweeted:

English:

The Democrats refuse to vote for Voter I.D., or Citizenship. The reason is very simple — They want to continue to cheat in Elections. This was not what our Founders desired. I have searched the depths of Legal Arguments not yet articulated or vetted on this subject, and will be presenting an irrefutable one in the very near future. There will be Voter I.D. for the Midterm Elections, whether approved by Congress or not! Also, the People of our Country are insisting on Citizenship, and No Mail-In Ballots, with exceptions for Military, Disability, Illness, or Travel. Thank you for your attention to this matter! PRESIDENT DONALD J. TRUMP

February 13, 2026

=== Voter registration and vote counting ===
On March 26, 2025, Trump signed Executive Order 14248, which called for significant changes to vote registration, ballot casting, and vote counting. Similar to the SAVE Act, the order required proof of citizenship for vote registration for federal elections, but is more restrictive than the bill in its documentation requirements, potentially impacting 146 million Americans who do not have passports. The order also threatened states with federal lawsuits or federal funding losses if they counted mail-in ballots received after Election Day; and empowered the Department of Homeland Security and the Department of Government Efficiency to compare state voter registration lists and federal immigration databases. Voting rights activists and analysts expressed alarm, describing the effort as an attempt at both voter suppression and vesting power to the president to control elections. The order requested the Election Assistance Commission (EAC) to make these changes. The executive order also called for the EAC to "rescind all previous certifications of voting equipment based on prior standards", but at the same time for states to use election technology that is not available.

Current members of the board of advisors of the Election Assistance Commission (as of March 2025) include J. Christian Adams (who previously sat on the Presidential Advisory Commission on Election Integrity), Hans von Spakovsky (a lawyer for the Heritage Foundation who has falsely alleged widespread voter fraud), and an attorney Wisconsin Institute for Law and Liberty (which attempted to purge over 200,000 voters from the voter rolls in Wisconsin prior to the 2020 election). As of February 2025, Chris Wlaschin, the chief information security officer for Election Systems and Software is a member of the Technical Guidelines Development Committee as a technical advisor. He was previously the chief information security official at the United States Department of Health and Human Services during the first Trump administration.

On March 31, two separate federal lawsuits challenging the order were filed by the Democratic Party (the Democratic National Committee, Democratic Governors Association, Democratic Senatorial Campaign Committee, Democratic Congressional Campaign Committee, Chuck Schumer and Hakeem Jeffries) and two non-profits (the Campaign Legal Center and the State Democracy Defenders Fund), arguing that it violated the Elections Clause of the United States Constitution. On April 24, a federal judge granted a preliminary injunction to block the proof-of-citizen requirement, but denied requests to block the mail-in ballot restrictions and state voter registration list cross-checks. Additional lawsuits were also filed against the order by 19 Democratic state attorneys general on April 3, as well as the states of Washington and Oregon on April 4. On June 13, a federal judge blocked the executive order. In October 2025, a U.S. District judge permanently blocked part of the executive order regarding proof of citizenship. In January 2026, a federal judge blocked the Trump administration from enforcing Trump's executive order in Oregon and Washington state.

In August 2025, Trump stated that he planned to issue an executive order mandating voter identification for all elections in the United States.

In August 2026, Trump pointed to India’s electoral system while pushing for mandatory voter ID in U.S. elections, citing Chief Election Commissioner of India Gyanesh Kumar’s comments on India’s use of photo ID for voting. He said India has a strong voter ID system and the U.S. should adopt something similar. The remarks came as he supported the SAVE America Act, which would require proof of citizenship and photo ID.

=== Mail-in voting and voting machines ===
In the aftermath of the 2025 Russia–United States Summit, Trump said that he and Vladimir Putin agreed that mail-in voting risked election integrity. Trump had previously both voted by mail and encouraged his supporters to do so in 2024. Republicans have also previously promoted absentee ballots in states such as Florida for their advantage. Trump had won three states in 2024 where Republicans had encouraged mail-in voting. The BBC credited mail-in ballots for assisting his 2024 election victory.

A few days later, Trump announced that he would sign an executive order that would ban both mail-in ballots and voting machines. Democrats have tended to vote more by mail-in ballots than Republicans, so such a move would likely favor the latter group. Trump had historically favored paper ballots and hand-counting of ballots over electronic voting machines, while election officials criticized the former as being expensive, tedious and of limited accuracy.

Democratic leaders, legal scholars and the American Civil Liberties Union have criticized the move as a form of voter suppression, questioned its legality, and accused Trump of seeking to undermine confidence in elections. David Daley warned that during the 2026 midterm elections, "there will be National Guard troops and masked ICE to intimidate potential Democratic voters in force. You can't intimate people through the mail." Similarly, writing in The Washington Spectator, a former State Department official argued that the expansion of ICE by the One Big Beautiful Bill Act would likely lead to ICE becoming involved in election interference by means of its databases of sensitive information, surveillance of opposition or critics, deputization of local officials, and raids or deployments.

Writing in Slate, Paul Finkelman argued that Republican voters would be disproportionately impacted by abolishing mail-in voting, as many voters who would be affected are rural, working-class, or elderly. He also expressed concern that shifting from voter machines to paper ballots would increase the likelihood of electoral fraud through ballot stuffing. Some Republican officials who otherwise supported Trump disagreed with banning mail-in ballots.

Trump warned each state to comply, stating, "the States are merely an 'agent' for the Federal Government in counting and tabulating the votes." He falsely claimed that the United States was the only country to use mail-in ballots. He said that this proposed executive order would be part of a "movement" that he would lead to end mail-in voting. He also said, "If you [don't] have mail-in voting, you're not gonna have many Democrats get elected." Election experts have responded that the United States Constitution only allows for states to run elections and that Trump's characterizations were incorrect and inappropriate. Later in August, Trump said that he would make an exemption for voters in poor health or military members who are far from home.

In October 2025, Trump called for the end of early voting in advance of the 2025 California Proposition 50 referendum and 2025 New York City mayoral election, contradicting both earlier statements by him supporting early voting for Republican politicians and advice by California state Republican officials.

In March 2026, Trump issued an executive order to the US Postal Service to halt the delivery of mail-in ballots in states that did not hand over voter rolls to the administration.

On June 29, 2026, a national Republican-led legal challenge to bar mail in voting ballots from being counted after election days are held in the United States was struck down by the U.S. Supreme Court.

=== Department of Justice ===
In March 2025, the Department of Justice (DOJ) withdrew from two lawsuits initiated during the Biden administration related to preventing racial discrimination in voting.

In May 2025, the DOJ charged four people with illegal voting. Press releases by the DOJ and a statement by Kristi Noem, the head of the Department of Homeland Security (DHS), credited an unspecified role by the Department of Government Efficiency (DOGE) in its investigations. DOGE members Elon Musk and Antonio Gracias previously stated in March that DOGE compared data from the Social Security Administration to state voter data in an attempt to find non-citizens of the United States who voted, with Gracias referring these cases to DHS' Homeland Security Investigations unit.

In May 2025, the DOJ sued North Carolina election officials, accusing the state board of elections of being non-compliant with the Help America Vote Act (HAVA) by not collecting driver's license numbers or Social Security numbers of over 200,000 voters. This allegation is based on one made by Jefferson Griffin in the aftermath of the 2024 North Carolina Supreme Court election. The DOJ demanded a court order for state election officials to contact those voters and assign them a special identification number if they are missing the aforementioned identifiers. By September 2025, the Democratic National Committee and state voting rights groups intervened and negotiated an agreement between the DOJ and North Carolina that about 98,000 voters in the state who had not initially shared their personal data could do so and vote with a provisional ballot.

A letter was also sent in May to Arizona, accusing state officials of not following HAVA and threatening a lawsuit. A third letter was sent in June to Wisconsin, also accusing the Wisconsin Elections Commission of non-compliance with HAVA and threatening federal funding.

In June 2025, the DOJ also became involved in a lawsuit by Judicial Watch and the Constitution Party of Oregon against the Oregon Secretary of State's Office, alleging that the state had not done enough to remove dead or otherwise ineligible voters from the state voter rolls.

In July 2025, Harmeet Dhillon wrote a letter to Texas that four of its congressional districts were "unconstitutional racial gerrymanders." All four districts were led by Black or Hispanic Democrats. This letter was a justification by Texas Governor Greg Abbott for the state's redistricting initiative.

As of July 2025, the DOJ has been contemplating charging local and state election officials if the department believes that those officials have insufficiently secured their election systems. Some of the requests for voting data have come from prosecutors from the criminal division of the DOJ.

On March 17, 2025, interim U.S. attorney Ed Martin announced the creation of a new office, "Special Unit Election Accountability" to investigate electoral fraud. He asked for volunteers to join the office, which he said had started one investigation.

As of June 2025, Martin was working on federal pardons for the fake electors involved in the Trump fake electors plot. Martin hoped that such an effort would influence courts. He also planned to propose that Trump would pardon the electors involved in the 1960 presidential election in Hawaii.

==== Voter roll data requests ====
The DOJ sent requests for personal information on non-citizens who were on the state voter rolls in four California counties. Officials in Orange County, California shared a voter roll list with redacted social security and driver's license information, and offered a confidentiality agreement. The DOJ sued the county in response.

In May 2025, the DOJ asked the Colorado Secretary of State's Office to share "all records" from the 2024 elections and to keep all available records from the 2020 election. A former DOJ attorney said such a request "would fill Mile High Stadium". Colorado Secretary of State Jena Griswold suspected that this request was related to Colorado's prosecution of Tina Peters.

By August 2025, the DOJ had made these requests to at least 19 states, planning to eventually make requests to all 50 states. 15 of these states had requests for voter rolls, sparking privacy concerns. Responses from election officials varied from no response, reviewing the requests, sharing public versions of the voter rolls, and refusing to share the voter lists. The chairwoman of the Wisconsin Elections Commission expressed concern that the federal government would use this information for new rules that would make voting more difficult. Election officials were worried that the Trump administration would create a nationwide database, with Justin Levitt noting the security risks of doing so.

By September 2025, the DOJ had intended to collect a national voter roll database based on these requests to individual states. Both the Civil Rights Division and Criminal Division of the DOJ have been involved in the project. The department wished to collect the last four Social Security number digits for every voter in the country, and then compare that data to SAVE from the DHS to find non-citizens who are registered voters in each state. Research has consistently found that voting by non-citizens is "essentially nonexistent". For some states, Civil Rights Division prosecutors offered for election officials to query their state voter roll through SAVE. Election experts said these requests from the DOJ could be in violation of the Privacy Act of 1974. Voting rights organizations said that the project suggests a plan by the Trump administration to interfere in the 2026 midterm elections. Due to the constant updates to state voter rolls due to address changes, new registrations and deaths, a national database would be quickly out of date.

Also in September 2025, the DOJ had been discussing with Homeland Security Investigations (HSI) an agreement on sharing voter registration data for investigations by HSI related to crime or immigration. The data that the DOJ had collected to date does not have Social Security numbers, so the DOJ planned to use HSI databases instead of SAVE to confirm voter registration.

As of October 2025, the DOJ requested voter registration data from at least 40 states, including driver's license numbers and partial Social Security numbers. Almost all states have not shared their full voter databases, except for Indiana and Wyoming. The Criminal Division emailed officials in at least 13 states to come to an "information-sharing agreement." The DOJ has sued eight states to compel them to share data, while voters in two other states (Nebraska and South Carolina) have filed state-level lawsuits to prevent their states from sharing the data. Seven out of eight states being sued have Democratic governors. In Oregon and Maine, two of the states being sued, voters and voting rights groups have counter-sued or have otherwise attempted to stop the requests. While the National Voter Registration Act and Help America Vote Act, two laws that the DOJ cites as justification, do require states to maintain their voter roles, election experts questioned the legality of the DOJ's efforts for maintaining the data itself.

In September 2025, judge Diane Goodstein ordered a temporary injunction against sharing South Carolina voter data with the DOJ. Dhillon criticized the order on social media, writing that the DOJ "will not stand" for it. Multiple responses to Dhillon's post threatened Goodstein, and Goodstein had reportedly been targeted with death threats for multiple weeks. On October 4, Stephen Miller also posted on social media that "left-wing terrorism" was "shielded by far-left Democrat judges". On the same day, a large fire appeared in Goodstein's home, severely injuring three people. While the cause is unknown and under investigation, several Democratic politicians accused Dhillon or Miller of threatening Goodstein with their rhetoric. The Daily Beast noted that officials in the Trump administration had used "public intimidation tactics to pressure judges who rule against the administration."

In January 2026, Central California U.S. District Court Judge David O. Carter blocked the Justice Department's requests for driver's license numbers, Social Security numbers, and other confidential information for individuals on voter rolls in California, rejecting the department's invocation of the Civil Rights Act of 1960 as justification to do so.

==== Voting equipment requests ====
In August 2025, Andrew "Mac" Warner, a high-ranking official in the DOJ's Civil Rights Division who supported false claims of fraud during the 2020 election, contacted two Republican county election clerks in Missouri to request access to equipment from Dominion Voting Systems that was used during the 2020 election. Both clerks refused. One of the clerks was contacted by Jay Ashcroft, who told him to comply with the request and offered replacement equipment. Local election officials are forbidden by law from allowing unauthorized access to election systems, and the DOJ has little to no authority related to those systems.

==== Support for weakening Voting Rights Act ====
Democracy Docket reported that, in September 2025, the DOJ submitted an amicus brief in Louisiana v. Callais that argued that Section 2 of the Voting Rights Act of 1965 is unconstitutional in practice. This argument was a significant reversal of how the DOJ has historically applied Section 2. 16 states led by Republicans also submitted an amicus brief in the same case with a different argument that Section 2 is unconstitutional.

==== Support for ending birthright citizenship ====
On January 20, 2025, Trump signed Executive Order 14160, aiming to end birthright citizenship in the United States. Over a dozen states sued the Trump administration in response by the next day. The lawsuit stated that, if the executive order were implemented, it would affect thousands of people born to parents who are not citizens, who "will lose their rights to participate in the economic and civic life of their own country — to work, vote, serve on juries, and run for certain offices." In September 2025, the DOJ asked the Supreme Court to review the legality of the executive order.

==== Threats to remove citizenship for political reasons ====
In June 2025, the DOJ published a memo that urged the Trump administration to "maximally" pursue denaturalization cases, especially when the persons involved "pose a potential danger to national security, including those with a nexus to terrorism." Talking Points Memo expressed concern about broad language used by the memo and that said language could apply to political differences. Legal experts were also concerned that threats of denaturalization could limit civic participation.

==== Investigation of Smartmatic ====
In August 2024, three Smartmatic executives were indicted by the DOJ under the Biden administration, charging them with foreign bribery, money laundering, and/or conspiracy. In February 2025, Trump signed an executive order pausing enforcement of the Foreign Corrupt Practices Act (FCPA). The DOJ closed almost half of its investigations and then continued enforcing the law by only working on cases involving "U.S. strategic interests". Despite dropping a similar case in New Jersey, the DOJ announced in April that it would continue prosecuting the Smartmatic executives. At the time, Smartmatic was suing Fox News for defamation due to the outlet spreading false claims of fraud during the 2020 United States presidential election. Smartmatic had previously sued other right-wing news organizations and Trump allies over the same false claims. In October 2025, the DOJ extended the case to indict Smartmatic as well, accusing the company of money laundering and violating the FCPA. The Wall Street Journal wrote that "[the] case underscores the Trump administration's willingness to enforce the Foreign Corrupt Practices Act in select circumstances."

==== Election monitoring ====
In October 2025, the DOJ announced plans to send federal election monitors to Passaic County, New Jersey and five counties in California for the 2025 New Jersey gubernatorial election and 2025 California Proposition 50 vote, respectively. The New Jersey Republican Party and California Republican Party both wrote to the DOJ requesting the election monitors. Election monitoring by the DOJ has been done historically by both Democratic and Republican governments. However, the department generally observed for compliance with the Voting Rights Act rather than the stated purpose of "ballot security", which a former federal election monitor described as untypical. Michael Gates, a supporter of voter identification laws and a DOJ official who sought state voter databases, was designated as one of the monitors in Orange County, California.

The DOJ said that it would coordinate with U.S. Attorney's offices, state officials and local officials. However, election officials in Los Angeles County, California were only aware of the announcement when contacted by a reporter. California Governor Gavin Newsom accused the Trump administration of "rigging the election" through the poll monitors. California Attorney General Rob Bonta later announced that that state would have its own monitors to observe the federal election monitors.

On February 2, 2026, Trump called into Dan Bongino's podcast and alleged that some states had miscounted or misreported their election results. Those states certified that he had lost the election when, according to him, he had really won. "Amazing that the Republicans aren't tougher on it", Trump said. His proposal was that Republicans at the national level should say who won each state election. "The Republicans ... should take over the voting in at least, many, 15 places.' The Republicans ought to nationalize the voting. We have states that are so crooked, and they’re counting votes."

==== Mail-in ballot lawsuit ====
In September 2025, Dhillon wrote a letter to the Ohio Attorney General urging the state to change the current law that mail-in ballots postmarked by Election Day can still be counted up to four days after the election. The letter said that Ohio should "take immediate action (legislative or otherwise) to comply with federal law, and avoid costly litigation in federal court." Ohio Secretary of State Frank LaRose told Ohio legislators that the DOJ believes Ohio's current law violated federal law. Two Republican Ohio state senators then proposed a bill that mail-in ballots must be received by the close of polls on Election Day.

==== Executive Order 14399 ====
Executive Order 14399
- Ensuring Citizenship Verification and Integrity in Federal Elections
- Type: Executive order
- Number: 14399
- President: Donald Trump
- Signed: March 31, 2026; 7 months ago

Federal Register details
- Federal Register document number: 2026-06601
- Publication date: April 3, 2026
- Document citation: 91 FR 17125

In March 2026, Trump signed Executive Order 14399. The order says that the Department of Homeland Security in coordination with the Social Security Administration (SSA) "shall" create a "State Citizenship List", "a list of individuals confirmed to be United States citizens who will be above the age of 18 at the time of an upcoming Federal election and who maintain a residence" in each state. The list "shall be derived from Federal citizenship and naturalization records, SSA records, SAVE data, and other relevant Federal databases." The order says "the USPS shall not transmit mail-in or absentee ballots from any individual unless those individuals have been enrolled on a State-specific list". The order directs the attorney general to "prioritize" investigating and prosecuting the people and entities involved in election administration. The order directs the USPS (an independent agency) to propose rulemaking on "ballot mail" including that it be marked as "official elections mail", and bear technology to facilitate tracking. According to the Brennan Center for Justice, "it suggests that USPS would need to refuse to deliver all mail ballots from residents of any state that either declines to share its list of approved mail and absentee voters or fails to adopt USPS’s mandated ballot design changes." The center also noted that the USPS "is running out of money".

The Elections Clause says federal elections "shall be prescribed in each state by the Legislature thereof" and that such regulations may "at any time" be made or altered by the Congress. The Elections Clause makes no mention of the president. Multiple lawsuits were filed against the order.

==== Watson v. Republican National Committee ruling ====
On June 29, 2026, the U.S. Supreme Court, in the 5-4 Watson v. Republican National Committee ruling, ruled against a Republican National Committee led effort to block counting of election day ballots in the time after election day is held by upholding a Mississippi state mail-in ballot law.

== Election security ==
The Guardian reported that, by February 2025, the Trump administration had indicated that it did not perceive Russia as a cybersecurity threat. Cybersecurity experts warned that this position would lead the United States to be vulnerable to cyberattacks from Russia. Similarly, during the first Trump administration in 2017, Trump proposed collaborating with Russia to protect against election-related hacking, but had later walked away from the idea.

=== CISA ===
In response to a January 2025 executive order by Donald Trump, Cybersecurity and Infrastructure Security Agency (CISA) acting director Bridget Bean ordered a freeze of all election security work until the department completed a review of all work related to election security and the countering of misinformation, disinformation and malinformation dating back to 2017. 17 employees involved in those programs were placed on administrative leave on February 7, 2025.

Kristi Noem had previously stated during her confirmation hearing for Secretary of Homeland Security her view that CISA had moved "far off mission" and her interest in working with Senators to "rein them in." The review was completed on March 6. However, a CISA spokesperson said that there were no plans to release it publicly.

In February and March 2025, Noem cancelled over $9 million in yearly contracts between CISA and Center for Internet Security, primarily targeting the Elections Infrastructure Information Sharing and Analysis Center (EI-ISAC), which had helped election officials and law enforcement across the United States monitor and share information about election threats such as cyberattacks on election software and hardware. Her department, as of April 8, is also considering further cuts to intrusion detection systems and cyberattack detection.

Over 130 probationary employees were fired in February (including 10 who worked with election officials), but were ordered reinstated by a federal judge the next month. As of April 8, some of those ordered reinstated said that they were still placed on leave. Over a hundred additional employees were fired by the Department of Government Efficiency in February and March, including red team staffers as well as staffers in the Cyber Incident Response Team. In April 2025, CBS News reported that the Trump administration planned to reduce the workforce of CISA by as many as 1,300 employees.

On April 9, Trump issued a presidential memorandum targeting Chris Krebs, the former director of CISA, revoking his security clearance and instructing the Department of Homeland Security and the United States Attorney General to investigate him. In 2020, Krebs had publicly denied Trump's false claims of fraud during the 2020 United States presidential election. During Krebs' tenure, CISA had focused on counteracting election misinformation and disinformation. On May 1, the Department of Homeland Security revoked his Global Entry membership.

CISA had previously helped local and state election officials with both physical and digital security, including counteracting misinformation and disinformation campaigns. Due to these changes in leadership and workforce personnel, employee morale had significantly diminished. Key staff members had left the agency. Leadership had required approval for communication with external partners, several of which expressed fear about access by the Department of Government Efficiency to sensitive data and federal computer systems. The agency's work on security advocacy - especially with respect to open source software and artificial intelligence - was reported to be at risk. Some employees have expressed that they are forbidden to address threats to democracy, and have expressed fear of discussing those threats. Current and former employees said that these cuts were dangerous to national security and the economy.

As of April 2025, the Trump administration plans to remove civil service protections from 80% of the remaining CISA workforce, which would allow the administration to remove them for political causes. Maine Secretary of State Shenna Bellows remarked that the termination of EI-ISAC resulted in reduced ability of election officials across the country to collaborate and share information. As of April 2025, 28 states have passed laws forbidding private donors from funding election infrastructure. These laws were influenced by false claims that Mark Zuckerberg, who donated to election offices in the past, had interfered with the 2020 United States elections on behalf of the Democratic Party. As such, local and state election officials have been prohibited from seeking external funds for cybersecurity assistance.

By September 2025, about 1,000 people have left CISA, about a third of its workforce. Marci McCarthy, who was appointed the CISA director of public affairs, was a Republican Party official in Georgia who spread false claims about the 2020 election and about the January 6 attack.

Voting rights experts were concerned about "catastrophic" risks of not counteracting election interference such as infiltration of voting machine equipment or state voter lists or attacks against critical infrastructure such as power grids.

The New York Times has attributed Trump's hostility to CISA to Chris Krebs' description of the 2020 election as secure. Aside from election security, cuts to CISA have broadly impacted national security defenses.

Cybersecurity and election experts warned that some election officials did not trust CISA and would find the organization's attempts at local collaboration unhelpful.

=== Department of Homeland Security ===
The United States Department of Homeland Security (DHS) has dedicated about $28 million from the Homeland Security Grant Program for election security, and those grants are administered by the Federal Emergency Management Agency (FEMA). In July 2025, DHS published new grant rules in compliance with Executive Order 14248. One rule was that jurisdictions must "prioritize compliance" with the latest Voluntary Voting System Guidelines, even though, as of August 2025, those standards have not yet been used anywhere in the United States. Another rule mandated use of the Systematic Alien Verification for Entitlements tool for verifying citizenship of anyone working at election polling places. The state of Maine forfeited the grant due to not intending to comply with the grant requirements.

In August 2025, Heather Honey was appointed as a senior leader at the DHS Office of Strategy, Policy, and Plans, being responsible for election infrastructure of the United States. Honey had worked with Cleta Mitchell to overturn the 2020 election, spread election denial conspiracy theories, and ran PA Fair Elections, an organization connected to Mitchell's Election Integrity Network that challenged thousands of residents' right to vote. During a meeting with election officials across the United States, Honey spread false claims of fraud during the 2020 United States presidential election and accused cybersecurity experts from her department of censoring those claims. She told officials that she would be an advisor to CISA; that she planned to release a document on "best practices" for election equipment; that she would not provide funding for information centers previously used for election security; and that states should use fusion centers, typically used by law enforcement and intelligence agencies, instead.

Inspired by Executive Order 14248 and in partnership with the Department of Government Efficiency (DOGE), the U.S. Citizenship and Immigration Services (USCIS) released its Systematic Alien Verification for Entitlements (SAVE) program for free to non-federal government agencies in April 2025 and said that it had integrated SAVE with Social Security Administration data in May 2025. As such, SAVE had the ability to be used for searching voter rolls. It had been redesigned with the intention to help election officials verify that only American citizens had been voting. Two states that withdrew from the Electronic Registration Information Center, Louisiana and Texas, have piloted the system. A DHS staffer gave a briefing about the project to the Election Integrity Network, an election denial group led by Cleta Mitchell. Numerous subject matter experts expressed concern about the system's data quality, lack of transparency, privacy and legality. Democratic Senators Alex Padilla, Gary Peters and Jeff Merkley warned about its accuracy and potential to be used for voter disenfranchisement. The Brennan Center for Justice also warned about false conspiracy theories on election integrity and unfounded prosecutions of election officials.

By September 2025, according to USCIS, election officials had run SAVE on over 33 million voters to verify citizenship or death based on name, date of birth, and the last four digits of their Social Security number. SAVE has been used by several states led by Republicans such as Ohio and Louisiana. The DHS had made states using SAVE by uploading their data a condition for federal grants. Per USCIS policy, any data query on SAVE, including state voter rolls, is stored by DHS for 10 years. Both input queries and their results are stored by SAVE. DHS has not responded to questions from Congress members about SAVE, and USCIS has not shared information about its accuracy or testing procedures, or what the agency does with uploaded data. The May 2025 agreement between DHS and the Social Security Administration (SSA) for integrating Social Security data into SAVE has few guardrails for accuracy, few details on data security, and does not forbid DHS for using the data for other reasons. Several audits and analysis reports have documented that SSA citizenship data is unreliable due to being outdated or incomplete. System accuracy may be further limited due to variations of voter names and the use of partial Social Security numbers. As of October 2025, USCIS plans to add passport data from the State Department to SAVE, as well as data from state driver's licenses.

According to Democracy Docket, the voter registration data that the DOJ has been collecting has also been shared with the DHS for the stated purpose of removing non-citizens from voter rolls. Several states that have opposed the DOJ's requests for private voter data have uploaded that same data to SAVE. 20 states have agreements with DHS for running SAVE as of July 2025.

Also in October 2025, voting rights organizations, including the League of Women Voters and the Electronic Privacy Information Center, filed a lawsuit against the DHS using SSA and DOJ data in SAVE for verifying voter eligibility. In a supplemental briefing by the plaintiffs, a voter registration director in Travis County, Texas warned that, of the persons from the county ran through SAVE and flagged as non-citizens, about 25% were found to have registered at a state Department of public safety, which requires citizenship proof for registration.

In August 2025, USCIS announced a policy that nongovernmental groups were not allowed to register new voters at naturalization ceremonies, only allowing local and state election officials to do so.

=== Other agencies ===
On January 21, 2025, it was reported that the Trump administration fired all members of the Cyber Safety Review Board. At the time it was still investigating Salt Typhoon, an intrusion believed to allow the Chinese government to access phone and broadband networks and spy on the communications of over a million Americans, including Trump while he was a presidential candidate.

In February 2025, Pam Bondi disbanded the Foreign Influence Task Force, an FBI task force that investigated foreign influence operations, which included operations that aimed to influence elections in the United States. Bondi said that this action would "free resources to address more pressing priorities, and end risks of further weaponization and abuses of prosecutorial discretion." Election experts expressed concern that such a move would signal that the federal government did not prioritize foreign election interference.

In March 2025, the head of the FBI Elections Threats Task Force resigned. As of April 2025, Bondi has not filled this role.

On April 3, 2025, Trump fired Timothy D. Haugh, the head of the National Security Agency and United States Cyber Command. Haugh had previously been involved in counteracting Russian interference in the 2016 United States elections.

In September 2026, following the Trump administration's weakening of CISA, Pete Hegseth issued a directive. In this announcement, Hegseth ordered military intelligence and cyber entities to protect election infrastructure from foreign interference during the November midterm elections, ensuring that eligible voters could cast their ballots free from fear or foreign coercion. David Becker a former U.S. Justice Department attorney, also responded to the announcement, saying that the action looked like a show because of its timing, and he noted that if the government was serious about helping with the election, it should not have fired election cybersecurity experts in 2025. Some experts and Democratic election officials also expressed concern about the Trump administration's involvement in voting and vote counting. Towards the end of September, there has movement regarding supposedly illegal voting and the current polling on the second Trump presidency to instate martial law.

== Suppressing disinformation research ==
On January 7, 2025, Mark Zuckerberg announced that Meta would stop working with third-party fact-checking organizations, claiming that these organizations were politically biased and that the company's previous approach to content moderation led to "censorship". Some of these fact-checkers had relied on Meta for funding. Senator Markwayne Mullin said that Zuckerberg had met with Trump prior to announcing this policy change. Trump had previously threatened Zuckerberg with imprisonment if Meta continued its work on counteracting election-related disinformation for the 2024 election.

On January 20, Trump signed an executive order alleging past censorship by the United States federal government against its citizens and banning its officials from doing so. Disinformation experts and journalists warned that this order could further the spread of false information and harassment online, as well as lead to a chilling effect between government agencies and technology companies with respect to sharing information, potentially impacting national security. Others warned that the order could be seen as a form of censorship itself, and that some researchers may self-censor when applying for funding for their work.

On April 16, the Trump administration announced the closure of the Counter Foreign Information Manipulation and Interference office, which had worked on monitoring disinformation attacks by foreign nation-states. Jeanne Shaheen criticized the closure, which James Rubin compared to "unilateral disarmament." The closure was reportedly overseen by Darren Beattie.

On April 18, the National Science Foundation (NSF) announced that it would stop funding research involving misinformation, disinformation and malinformation. Over 50 grants involving research on information spread and trust, collectively worth about $9 million, had been canceled by that day. Kate Starbird said, "These cuts — along with diminished transparency of platforms (via data access to researchers), platforms retreating from content moderation, and the defunding of fact-checking organizations — are likely to make it even more difficult for researchers, journalists, and everyday people to find trustworthy information and to understand how social media and other information spaces are being manipulated for political and financial gain." The Pentagon and the National Institutes of Health had also cut funding for studying misinformation, conspiracy theories or social science research. By May 15, over 1,400 grants in total, collectively worth over $1 billion, had been cut by the NSF. Officials from these departments claimed without evidence that the research supported censoring right-wing Americans. Researchers responded that these claims conflated academic research of misinformation with content moderation policies by technology companies, and expressed concerned that these attacks and loss of support by social media platforms and the federal government would result in information pollution.

Starting in February 2025, Kari Lake, appointed by Trump as a senior adviser for the U.S. Agency for Global Media (USAGM), placed all staff of Voice of America (VOA) on administrative leave, fired contractors and planned to significantly reduce funding for all organizations within USAGM such as VOA, Radio Free Europe/Radio Liberty (RFE/RL), Radio Free Asia and the Open Technology Fund. Despite these cuts, Russia and China have continued information operations. Thailand's state broadcaster and a news channel in Indonesia have replaced programming from VOA by Chinese state media, and China had been working to grow its media programs in Ethiopia and Nigeria. RFE/RL had been forced to stop investigations on organized crime and influence campaigns, with Anne Applebaum writing that Russian government media would likely fill the gap. Russia has been accused by misinformation researchers and European officials of conducting a significant disinformation campaign to influence the 2025 Moldovan parliamentary election, even as the Trump administration had limited efforts to combat disinformation from the Russian government, including cutting at least $54 million in foreign aid to Moldova. Some of these cuts included efforts to support an "inclusive and participatory political process" and independent media programs in Moldova.

Trump threatened tariffs on any country that regulated harmful content on social media platforms, and Secretary of State Marco Rubio gave an order to State Department diplomats to actively oppose the Digital Services Act, which investigated several of those platforms, such as X.

In September 2025, the State Department told European countries that the United States would stop supporting anti-foreign disinformation efforts against countries such as Russia, China, and Iran. These efforts were originally part of the Global Engagement Center, which was shut down in December 2024 after Republican politicians in Congress refused to further fund the agency.

== Targeting political opponents ==
On March 6, 2025, Trump signed Executive Order 14230, which revoked the security clearances of Perkins Coie employees due the law firm's practices of diversity, equity, and inclusion. The firm has a history of legal work with the Democratic Party and many of its campaigns. It had worked with Fusion GPS, which commissioned the Steele dossier. The firm had also worked on cases involving voting rights. The order was partially blocked by a federal judge on March 12, who then ruled it unconstitutional on May 2. Elias Law Group, run by Democratic election lawyer Marc Elias was named by a memo from the Trump administration on March 22, 2025, accusing Elias of election interference during the 2016 United States presidential election. Elias had worked for the 2016 campaign of Hillary Clinton and had successfully challenged Trump's false claims of fraud during the 2020 United States presidential election. Elias responded, "Elias Law Group will not be deterred from fighting for democracy in court. There will be no negotiation with this White House about the clients we represent or the lawsuits we bring on their behalf."

On April 24, 2025, Trump signed an executive memorandum that called for Pam Bondi to investigate ActBlue, a fundraising platform for the Democratic Party, accusing the group of being used "to improperly influence American elections." ActBlue had previously been investigated by Republicans in the House of Representatives, asking for evidence that the group blocked foreign donations and further accusing the group of allowing fraudulent activity. However, this suspected fraudulent activity was identified by ActBlue itself, under typically very small amounts of money. Elon Musk had also accused ActBlue of funding Tesla Takedown protests. Mother Jones traced allegations of fraud on ActBlue to James O'Keefe in 2023, and then to the Fair Election Fund, a group that is funded by Musk. These claims then circulated among right-wing outlets and then were cited by state attorneys general and the congressional Republicans who investigated ActBlue. In June 2025, lawyers for ActBlue argued that the Republican House of Representatives investigations of the platform were intended to help the DOJ's separate investigation, accusing both groups of unconstitutional collaboration. Political allies of Trump have threatened both ActBlue and the progressive movement Indivisible with prosecution.

The Trump administration and its allies have attacked colleges, universities, museums, libraries, federal research institutions and public schools. The Atlantic assessed that such attacks are meant to limit the growth of Democratic voters and political officeholders, as American voters with higher education tended to be left-leaning.

Mother Jones described retaliation efforts against figures such as Chris Krebs and Mark Zaid and organizations such as Perkins Coie and ActBlue "as a form of election interference", expressing concern that these efforts could be expanded to include groups involved in voter registration, get out the vote, and democracy advocacy.

Multiple Democratic officials and political candidates have been threatened with imprisonment or death, investigated, arrested, detained, or charged with crimes by the Trump administration or its allies, including Representative LaMonica McIver, Newark Mayor Ras Baraka, Andrew Cuomo, Brad Lander, Adam Schiff, Letitia James, Pramila Jayapal, Eric Swalwell, Fani Willis, Gavin Newsom, Chicago Mayor Brandon Johnson, Illinois Governor JB Pritzker, and Kat Abughazaleh. In addition, 11 elected officials in New York (including Lander) were arrested by ICE, and James Comey had also been threatened with prosecution. A September 2025 YouGov poll found that 38% of Republicans surveyed (a plurality) believed that it was acceptable for a president to order investigations of that president's political adversaries, but 60% of Republicans were supportive when asked about the same situation involving Trump specifically.

In response to the 2025 Dallas ICE facility shooting, Trump said "bad things happen" when Democrats provoke right-wingers, which "won't be good for the left".

Mother Jones saw the pardon of January 6 United States Capitol attack defendants as elevating the chance of political violence or election interference.

California Governor Gavin Newsom noted that Trump extended deployment of the National Guard in Los Angeles through November 5, 2025, Election Day for California Proposition 50. Newsom and Illinois Governor JB Pritzker have worried that Trump could use the United States military to control elections. Election interference by the military or other federal agencies is illegal under federal law.

By October 2025, 23 out of 27 states with Republican governors have deployed National Guard troops. Trump has openly targeted cities run by Democrats, has threatened to invoke the Insurrection Act of 1807, and told military officials that the occupations of American cities, "run by the radical left Democrats" would be "a war from within". When Judge Karin Immergut issued temporary restraining orders barring the federal government from deploying the National Guard to Portland, Oregon, Stephen Miller accused her of "legal insurrection" and "the latest example of unceasing efforts to nullify the 2024 election by fiat."

After the assassination of Charlie Kirk, and with the main involvement of Stephen Miller, the Trump administration planned to target the finances of left-leaning groups that they claimed with little to no evidence were involved in political violence. Trump suggested that George Soros and Reid Hoffman, major donors to the Democratic Party, were potential targets. The White House accused several groups of financing or planning violent protests, including Open Society Foundations, ActBlue, Indivisible, and the Coalition for Humane Immigrant Rights. A White House official stated that "the goal is to destabilize Soros' network." As of October 2025, Gary Shapley is planning to appoint "allies" at the IRS Criminal Investigation unit to investigate major donors to the Democratic Party, including Soros and Open Society Foundations. Such an action would assist the Trump administration to investigate left-leaning groups.

The i Paper noted that Miller labeled the Democratic Party as a "domestic extremist organization", and the paper accused Miller of wanting to "dismantle the Democratic Party in time for [the November 2026] mid-term elections, or at the very least neuter it and brand it a political movement that is sponsoring terrorism on the streets." However, Salon interviewed historians and activists who argued that the federal government lacked the ability and means, in part due to cuts from DOGE, to enforce such plans, and that the vast majority of Americans do not support those plans.

=== Threats against blue states and blue cities ===
On February 20, 2025, at the Republican Governors Association, Trump predicted that the Republican Party would do well during the 2026 midterm elections, stating that "I think the midterms will be a big surprise" and that "the red states are going to do good, and the blue states, I don't know, maybe they'll totally disappear off that map."

After the June 2025 No Kings protests, Trump requested for ICE to target "America's largest cities", describing them as "the core of the Democrat Power Center", and falsely claiming that the Democratic Party cheats in elections with the help of undocumented immigrants.

During the 2025 United States federal government shutdown, Russell Vought announced that about $8 billion in funding for green energy and infrastructure would be cut from 16 states, all of whom had the majority of their populations vote for Kamala Harris during the 2024 elections, and were represented by two Democratic senators in Congress. Vought had also frozen $18 billion in funding for infrastructure and transportation to New York City, another region with mostly Democratic voters. Republican Representative Mike Lawler stated that this cancellation would also impact Republican voters in his district. Specifics about which projects were cut is not fully known as of October 2025. However, at least one project, the Pacific Northwest Hydrogen Hub, was planned for Washington, Oregon and Montana, the latter state voting for Trump. Trump announced that his administration would cut "Democrat programs" and that "they're never going to open again." Trump earlier said that he would meet with Vought for his advice on which "Democrat agencies" should be cut, calling out Vought's connection to Project 2025. (Trump had distanced himself from Project 2025 during his 2024 presidential campaign.) By October 14, the Trump administration suspended or canceled almost $28 billion in projects for transportation, security and counterterrorism, and energy, climate and infrastructure. These projects were overwhelmingly located in cities, Congressional districts or states led by Democrats. Trump made several comments about the cuts that The New Republic interpreted as implying that the cuts were revenge against Democrats.

Trump approved disaster aid for four states and the Leech Lake Band of Ojibwe, but denied requests from three states that he lost in 2024.

=== Threats against Zohran Mamdani ===
During his run for the 2025 New York City mayoral election, then-Democratic nominee Zohran Mamdani had been threatened by Republican congressional officials to have his citizenship removed, and Trump had repeatedly threatened funding for New York City if Mamdani won the election.

== Support for 2020 election deniers ==
In May 2025 and August 2025, Trump called for the release of Tina Peters, who was convicted in 2024 for unauthorized access to election machines. He threatened "harsh measures" is she was not released.

In September 2025, a Michigan state District Court Judge dismissed charges against the fake electors involved in the Trump fake electors plot in Michigan. Michigan Attorney General Dana Nessel expressed disappointment in the difficulty of fully prosecuting election-related court cases, saying that, "And I think in large part that's because of the fear of retaliation and the ongoing intimidation of threats our judges receive when presiding over cases in which the president has a stake". She further elaborated by saying "it's likely that in some circumstances, there are judges out there that think about the threats they've received" and the power of Trump and then make the decision not to rule against Trump or his supporters.

Also in September 2025, Alphabet Inc., the parent company of YouTube, wrote to Representative Jim Jordan that it would offer content creators previously banned for spreading COVID-19 misinformation or false claims about the 2020 United States presidential election an opportunity to rejoin the platform.

In September 2025, Trump requested that Microsoft fire Lisa Monaco, who had previously led investigations into Trump involving election interference and classified documents during the Biden administration. Laura Loomer claimed responsibility for Trump's demand.

== 2020 election investigation ==
In April 2025, Director of National Intelligence Tulsi Gabbard told the Cabinet of the United States that she started an investigation of the 2020 United States presidential election. The following month, her office took an unspecified number of Puerto Rico's voting machines with additional copies of machine data to investigate cyber security and operational deployment practices that pose a significant risk to elections.

In June 2025, Trump requested the appointment of a special prosecutor to investigate the 2020 election, which he falsely claimed was fraudulent.

In July 2025, U.S. Attorney Sigal Chattah asked the FBI to investigate the 2020 election, particularly debunked claims of voter fraud. Chattah aimed to remove registered voters from voter rolls, which she believed could affect census allocation for a local congressional election in Nevada. She also wanted to have charges dismissed against six Republicans involved in the Trump fake electors plot in 2020, having legally represented one of the fake electors until April 2025.

In October 2025, Kurt Olsen, who was involved in the attempts to overturn the 2020 United States presidential election, began working as a special government employee of the White House to investigate the 2020 election. He expressed interest in election equipment and finding federal government employees who he perceived as not loyal to Trump.

Also in October 2025, the DOJ requested for Fulton County, Georgia election officials to send records from the 2020 election. The Georgia State Election Board, with a Republican majority, reopened the investigation into the 2020 election in 2024, and during the summer of 2025, they asked the DOJ for help to get the records.

== Efforts for citizen-only census ==
On January 17, 2025, the Republican attorneys general of Kansas, Louisiana, Ohio and West Virginia sued to remove undocumented or temporary immigrants from Congressional seat apportionment numbers, claiming that those states either lost or would lose Congressional seats. Demographic researchers concluded that the inclusion of undocumented immigrants in United States census counts between 1980 and 2020 has had little effect on presidential elections or partisan Congressional control.

On January 20, 2025, Trump revoked a 2021 executive order by then-President Joe Biden that reversed the first Trump administration's previous attempts to remove non-citizens from the United States census. The census has historically counted residents independently of immigration status since 1790, and these counts have been used since the passage of the 14th Amendment to determine the number of seats of the United States House of Representatives and Electoral College votes per state. A Republican Party strategist believed that using citizenship information could be "advantageous to Republicans and Non-Hispanic Whites" for redistricting.

In February 2025, Warren Davidson and six other House Republicans introduced joint resolution for amending the Constitution to only include citizens in Congressional seat apportionment numbers. House Representative Marjorie Taylor Greene proposed a bill, supported by Trump, that would remove undocumented immigrants from a census that would be conducted "immediately" if the bill were to become law. This bill was proposed even though the next census would not be legally conducted until 2030. As of July 2025, three bills were introduced by Republicans that year that would count non-citizens during the 2030 census and then remove at least some of them from Congressional seat apportionment counts.

In August 2025, Trump said that he asked the United States Department of Commerce to "immediately" begin a census that would not count undocumented residents and would be based on the results of the 2024 presidential election. Other Republicans, such as Ron DeSantis and James Uthmeier, supported conducting a census before the 2026 elections, which would redistribute House of Representatives seats and redraw voting districts. Census advocates warned that this hypothetical census would risk the accuracy and efficacy of the 2030 census.

The 2020 United States census was the first to use differential privacy, a mathematical algorithm for anonymizing the data of individuals in a dataset. Several Republican politicians and conservative groups and activists have falsely claimed that differential privacy led to inaccurate 2020 census data that would have impacted Congressional seat apportionment and redistricting. In August 2025, Republican representative August Pfluger proposed the COUNT Act, a bill that would prevent the United States Census Bureau from using differential privacy, as well as add a question on citizenship status to the census. In October 2025, Republican senator Jim Banks wrote to Secretary of Commerce Howard Lutnick asking him to "investigate and correct errors from the 2020 Census". Wired Magazine wrote that removing differential privacy from the census could risk the privacy of all United States residents, dissuade immigrants and other residents from participating, and reduce the amount or type of data to be published. A census count that is unrepresentative could also affect Congressional seat apportionment.

== Voting rights ==
By April 2025, the voting section of the United States Department of Justice, which was responsible for enforcing national laws against voter discrimination, had all of its senior civil servants removed, and the Trump administration ordered department attorneys to dismiss its active cases. Dismissed cases include a lawsuit challenging a voting law in Georgia, cases involving voter roll purges in Virginia and Alabama, and a cases involving electoral district redrawing in Texas. Concerns were raised about voting rights reinforcement and the potential for political interference, and former attorneys for the unit accused the administration of seeking to lower morale through its reassignments. An internal memo announced that the unit would pivot to investigating voter fraud and "other forms of malfeasance". By September 2025, about 250 lawyers departed from the civil rights division (70% of its workforce), and the voting section had been reduced from 30 lawyers to "just a handful". The acting head of the voting section, Maureen Riordan, was previously counsel for the Public Interest Legal Foundation.

In May 2025, regarding a lawsuit by the Turtle Mountain Band of Chippewa Indians and the Spirit Lake Tribe in North Dakota, the United States Court of Appeals for the Eighth Circuit ruled that private individuals and groups do not have the right to file lawsuits to enforce Section 2 of the Voting Rights Act of 1965. In 2024, at least 15 Republican attorneys general made that same argument as a part of that case. Supreme Court Justice Neil Gorsuch previously wrote an opinion in 2021 that such a right is an "open question." J. Morgan Kousser found that about 92% of Section 2 cases since 1965 were initiated by private parties, while Franita Tolson stated that, without this right, "the Voting Rights Act is basically dead." In June 2025, the United States Supreme Court deferred ruling on Louisiana v. Callais until October. In July 2025, a leaked application memo by Paul Ingrassia to Project 2025 included his support for imposing voting tests. As of August 2025, Republican officials in Alabama planned to re-appeal Allen v. Milligan to the United States Supreme Court.

In August 2025, Defense Secretary Pete Hegseth posted on social media a video about the Communion of Reformed Evangelical Churches (CREC). In the video, one pastor from the church supported ending the right to vote for women in the United States, while another believed that people should vote as households rather than as individuals. The 19th noted that "head-of-household voting has historically disenfranchised women and people of color by concentrating power on the male leaders of the home." A Pentagon spokesman confirmed that Hegseth is a member of the church. The spokesman declined to comment on whether Hegseth supported women's right to vote, while Pentagon press secretary Kingsley Wilson said that Hegseth did a few days later. According to Nathalie Baptiste, writing for the Huffington Post, Doug Wilson, who was featured in the video, supports Christian reconstructionism, which does not support women's right to vote. Other Republican Party figures who have previously expressed support for ending women's suffrage include Paul Ingrassia, Abby Johnson (who spoke at the 2020 Republican National Convention) and John Gibbs. The Huffington Post suggested that the movement to end women's suffrage was partially motivated by more women voting than men in presidential elections since 1984, and more women voting for the Democratic Party than men.

During the confirmation hearing for Leo Brent Bozell III, nominated for ambassador to South Africa, Senator Chris Murphy asked him if he supported laws that prevented non-white people from voting in the United States. Bozell did not directly answer the question.

== Suggested cancellation of 2028 elections ==
During an August 2025 meeting between Ukrainian President Volodymyr Zelenskyy and Trump, Zelenskyy was asked a question about future elections in Ukraine, which were suspended by martial law due to the Russian invasion of Ukraine. Trump interjected, "So, you're saying, during the war you can't have elections. So let me just say, 3 1/2 years from now, so, you mean if we happen to be in a war with somebody, no more elections. Oh, that's good."

== Weaponization of Charlie Kirk assassination ==
On September 12, 2025, two days after the assassination of Charlie Kirk, Trump was asked by Brian Kilmeade about right-wingers who blamed Democrats, the media and leftists for Kirk's death, prior to the arrest of the suspect. Trump responded that Kirk's supporters should get "revenge at the voter box," and then attacked mail-in voting. On the same day, JD Vance gave a speech to Republican National Committee donors about Kirk and urged them to donate for the 2026 midterm elections, saying, "How do we take this national movement that Donald Trump and Charlie Kirk helped build, and how do we make sure that it shows up in those all important midterm elections? And the answer is, we've got to spend a lot of money to do it."

Indiana Senator Jim Banks and Alex Bruesewitz, a Trump advisor, have both invoked Kirk's assassination in a push for Indiana legislators to redistrict the state. Banks said, "They killed Charlie Kirk — the least that we can do is go through a legal process and redistrict Indiana into a nine to zero map."

On September 14, Trump stated that his administration would start a "major investigation" into his perceived political opponents on "the left" related to the assassination.

White House officials, including Vance, sought to preserve Kirk's system of mobilizing young voters, who were seen as crucial for the 2026 midterm elections.

== Univision ==
In October 2025, Trump publicly requested Google to add Univision back to YouTube TV, with Trump believing that the media platform being removed hurt the Republican Party for the 2026 midterms.

== Department of Defense ==
In October 2025, Secretary of Defense Pete Hegseth was asked about a memo that called for "the establishment of a National Guard response force that will be trained in crowd control and civil unrest deployed in all 50 states by April of 2026". Hegseth did not deny the report, responding, "I'm not gonna answer particulars on something that may be in the planning process."

== See also ==
- Attempts to overturn the 2020 United States presidential election
- Donald Trump's conflict with the news media
- Democratic backsliding in the United States
- Election denial movement in the United States
- List of people granted executive clemency in the second Trump presidency
- NSPM-7
- Republican efforts to restrict voting following the 2020 United States presidential election
- Republican Party efforts to disrupt the 2024 United States presidential election
- Unfair election
- Voter suppression in the United States
