= Green affordable housing =

Type of environmentally sustainable housing

Green affordable housing is reasonably priced housing that incorporates sustainable features. The phenomenon has become increasingly common in all over the world as climate change and the cost of housing become alarming issues. For example, the United States adopted state and local policies that favor or require green building practices for publicly owned or funded buildings. Potential benefits of green affordable housing include lower energy cost burden and improved health. One challenge to green affordable housing is the tendency to prioritize short-term costs over long-term benefits, leading to higher upfront cost. The challenge for green housing advocates is to see to the life cycle cost of the building. Many affordable housing projects already find it a challenge to raise capital to finance basic affordable housing. This challenge is compounded by the phenomenon of urban greening and environmental gentrification (also known as green gentrification), which can drive up housing prices and becomes a challenge for green affordable housing. Green affordable housing has taken form in traditionally wooden homes, green homes and most recently with 'upcycling' shipping containers.

== Definition ==
Although there is no single definition for what constitutes a Green Building, some elements recur in describing the concept. A Green Building can thus be defined as a high-performance building designed, built, operated and disposed of in a resource-efficient manner with the aim to minimize the overall (negative) impact on the built environment, human health and the natural environment. Some examples of green building features are choice of site and orientation, efficient use of materials and resources, indoor environmental quality and innovation.

Affordable Housing in the US is defined as dwelling units whose total housing costs fit within the budget of households at the local median income level. Affordability is commonly defined as not spending more than 30 percent of household income on housing. Given the higher exposure of low-income households and the need for public assistance, the most salient features of green affordable housing are energy use, material use/durability and a healthy indoor environment.

== Background ==
Publicly sponsored affordable housing projects use public funds or tax breaks in order to increase the stock of housing available to low income people. In addition, these projects often seek to improve the quality of the stock, in order to offer "decent, safe, sanitary, and affordable living environments". Green Affordable Housing projects add to those goals by lowering the lifetime cost of units and improving the quality. The concept of the triple bottom line defines sustainability to include economics, social equity and the environment. Affordable housing already addresses economics and social equity.

Sustainability measures obviously help the environment, but they can help the economics and social equity of housing projects as well. Housing units with a better design can improve health outcomes. With lower utility costs and improved health outcomes, the projects are more beneficial to low-income households, who are particularly exposed to poor housing quality and increases in general life costs, e.g. for utilities or medical expenses. Economically, sustainable design lowers the lifetime cost of a building. Since the preservation of affordable housing is sensitive to public funding, making affordable housing greener is a logic step to reducing long-term costs and increasing stability. Green design increases the economics, social equity, and environmental impact of affordable housing projects.

== Characteristics of the existing affordable housing stock ==
The affordable housing stock varies in terms of ownership, type and quality. However, financing of affordable housing has in most cases been constrained which means quality of affordable housing construction projects often has been compromised.

Policy programs that require green building standards in new construction will contribute to greening the affordable housing stock. However, new construction, whether green or conventional building, will in general be of higher quality, more efficient and healthier than older buildings. In contrast, the existing affordable stock constitutes a challenge from many perspectives. According to the National Center for Healthy Housing (NCHH) 5.7 million of American families live in substandard housing.

Existing low-cost units tend to be older than the housing stock in general. For example, in 1995, 68% of the affordable rental housing stock was constructed before 1970 and another 21% were built before 1980. A considerable share of the older affordable rental stock has been removed from the market since 1995, but many of the remaining units are in older buildings. Due for example to differences in building standards, technical development and historical maintenance, the older building stock is generally of worse quality than newer buildings. Deficits include cold down draft, poor insulation and inefficient windows and appliances.

== Utility expenditures for low-income households ==
Poor housing quality and low incomes contributes to fuel poverty, a phenomenomen that is more common among lower-income household than among households in general. Over the past decade home energy costs have risen in American homes in general. For low-income households this cost increase is even more pressing, for which home energy expenditures can be as high as a fifth of household income and more than a quarter of total housing costs. For that reason, improving energy efficiency has been pointed out as one of the challenges for American housing by the Joint Center for Housing Studies.

Energy expenditures for low income households have risen over the past decades, and the energy burden (energy expenditures as share of household income) has increased since 1997. Mean residential energy expenditures increased by 27 percent from 2001 to 2005, to $1,522, and by almost 20 percent to $1,822 by fiscal year 2009. The mean group residential energy burden (the ratio between mean energy expenditures and mean income for a given set of households) for households with incomes at or below 150 percent of U.S. Department of Health and Human Services' (HHS) poverty guidelines rose from 10.7 percent in 1997 to 13.5 percent in 2009. Utilities are included in housing expenditures in calculations of housing affordability. However, higher energy costs mean that rents will be higher and/or that more assistance is needed to cover the difference between actual and "affordable" energy expenditures, assistance that already is insufficient to cover this gap.

== Housing conditions and health problems in affordable housing ==
The deterioration of the existing stock has contributed to health problems for those living in affordable housing. Green updates to existing units can improve health outcomes. In addition, new housing units that address the causes of health issues improve the sustainability of the house. These units will have a lower lifetime building cost (because they won't need updates) and cost less to inhabitants (because of improved health outcomes).

== Costs and benefits of Green Affordable Housing ==
=== Upfront cost ===
Depending on the extent of sustainability design, the costs of green building often imply an initial capital cost premium compared to the cost of conventional buildings. Newer technology and the requirement of special labor skills are examples of cost drivers in green building projects. However, careful planning and deliberate choices can minimize these upfront costs. It is expected that the costs of building green will decrease over time, thanks to experience and the development of products and services.

There are many new types of products in the market that offer green affordable housing. The type of area the housing is located in (rural versus suburban versus urban) can also play a big role in choosing the best resource in building affordable green housing. Other factors include the location of housing and the type of transportation options that it supports. "Dispersed, low-density housing often cannot support viable public transit, biking, or pedestrian options, all but making auto ownership a necessary cost. The true cost of housing, therefore, is the combined cost of housing plus transportation."

Currently, one third of the human population resides in earthen houses; in developing countries this figure is more than one half. To build shelter in these developing countries with traditional industrial building materials (i.e. brick, concrete and steel) has proven impossible to fulfill the immense requirements for shelter in developing countries experiencing rapid population growth.

=== Life cycle cost ===
Funds available to the development and maintenance of affordable housing are scarce and, in order to maximize the supply of housing, low construction costs are often favored in choosing projects. However, one of the main arguments for green affordable housing is that a higher upfront cost for construction/renovation can be motivated by a lower operating cost over the life-time of the building, i.e. a lower life-cycle cost. If the initial investment leads to lower operating costs and/or higher durability the higher upfront capital cost needed for construction or renovation can be justified. This is especially true considering that public funding and tax breaks (like the low-income housing tax credit) for housing often require a longer term perspective from its builders. However, the need to preserve affordability of housing sometimes restricts value enhancement over time and may thus be a barrier to investing in green features.

=== Benefits ===
General green building benefits include environmental, economic and social benefits. The potential environmental benefits are enhancement and protection of biodiversity and ecosystems; improved air and water quality; reduced waste stream and conservation and restoration of natural resources. Economically potential benefits include lower operation costs; a market for green products and services; enhanced occupier productivity and the optimization of life-cycle performance. Social potential benefits include improved health and comfort for residents, minimizing the burden on local infrastructure and improved aesthetics. Affordable housing projects emphasize all three benefits, because they replace deteriorating stock, which harm the environment most and provide the least economic and social benefit.

The potential benefits of green affordable housing projects can be divided into direct, regional and global benefits. The direct benefits include lower utility costs, a healthier indoor environment and increased durability. Regional benefits include support for solid waste management and improved water quality. Globally benefits may include reduced energy use and carbon footprint and lower material use.

Energy efficiency and other sustainability improvements for low-income households have external benefits as well. Governments, energy-providers, property owners, and taxpayers all experience direct financial, indirect financial, and social welfare and livelihood co-benefits from green affordable housing projects. The improved quality and energy efficiency of these projects result in direct financial benefit in the form of reduced energy bills, reduced outlays for assistance to low-income households, reduced rates of shut-offs and thus reduced related administrative costs. Indirect financial co-benefits accrue to residents, property owners and tax-payers and society as a whole. Examples of these co-benefits are increased property values and economic activity, increased home and fire safety and reduced involuntary mobility for low-income households. Potential co-benefits for social welfare and livelihood include improved comfort, health and safety for the residents, community pride and improved health outcomes.

== Measures and strategies to achieve Green Affordable Housing ==
Governments, local housing authorities, and other interested parties can either begin new affordable housing projects with sustainable design, or retrofit the existing stock. While new projects require a larger upfront cost, these projects provide a greater return on investment than retrofitting. Initiatives for Green Affordable Housing are becoming increasingly more common, supported for example by The Green Affordable Housing Coalition

=== Standards for new housing ===
To ensure the energy efficiency of affordable housing, state and local governments have implemented sustainability standards. Washington was the first state to enact green building legislation in the U.S., with its Evergreen Sustainability Development Standard. This standard requires that all buildings that receive public funding meet "79 criteria that safeguard health and safety, increase durability, promote sustainable living, preserve the environment, and increase energy and water efficiency.” This applies to all publicly subsidized affordable housing, but not private projects.

The potential problem with sustainability standards is that projects will be more costly and projects will become cost prohibitive. While units that are built will be higher efficiency, the number of available units could decrease because of costs. A 2009 study prepared by Davis Langdon examines the effect of green standards on the costs of affordable housing projects in Seattle and Portland. This study compared "standard housing projects" (i.e. projects with no explicit sustainability goals) and projects attempting to achieve Built Green or LEED certification. The study includes both public and private affordable housing projects. At the time of the study, both cities had high sustainability standards for public projects, and Washington has only increased that standard since then. Construction cost analysis (in terms of cost per square foot) showed no significant difference between standard projects and green-rated projects. The study is limited by a small sample size, because of which they could not compare public and privately funded projects.

=== Updating existing housing stock ===
Many jurisdictions offer options for updating the energy efficiency of existing housing stock. The US Weatherization Assistance Program (WAP) offers the chance for low-income families to improve their housing in order to reduce energy consumption and costs. WAP uses funds from the federal Department of Energy. Federal funds are distributed by state offices and services are provided by local agencies. WAP has suffered because of increased competition for federal funds. The American Recovery and Reinvestment Act (ARRA) designated funds for WAP. The program as a whole was criticized for its failure to distribute these funds effectively.

Energy-efficient appliances are another method for households to decrease energy use. Low-income households have trouble realizing this gain energy efficiency. Energy-efficient appliances require a large up-front investment, and savings will not be realized for many years. Local grantees have the option to use Weatherization funds to support appliance purchases. However, unlike weatherization programs, the gains in household budgets are often not worth the investment. A 2010 study examined the households' purchasing habits in regard to high-efficiency appliances. Using household-level data, this study determines that homeowners are significantly more likely to own energy efficient large appliances, such as refrigerators or washing machines. However, the results show that the cost of this problem is negligible compared to overall energy consumption. This finding is important considering the increasing efficiency standards for household appliances. A higher standard may put simple appliances out of the price range of low income households, while not offering much energy relief for households that do own them.

=== Evaluation of Green Affordable Housing policies and incentives ===
As Green Affordable Housing still is a rather marginal phenomenon the outcomes of policy programs and specific interventions remain to be examined and confirmed. However, a number of studies are underway to examine the effects on health, energy savings and project costs. Other research initiatives seek to develop Green Affordable Housing while continuously evaluating the efforts. Some early learning point to the importance of training, outreach and resource coordination for the success of a green affordable housing program. For example, the government of Canada give out grants to retrofit existing homes as part of the Canada Greener Homes Initiative.

== Challenges of Green Affordable Housing ==
As green affordable housing is a tangable solution for better housing for humans and the environment, it comes with its challenges.

=== Environmental impact of building construction and operation ===
One significant aspect to consider in the context of green affordable housing is the environmental impact of building construction, operation, maintenance, and demolition. According to estimates by the UN Environment Programme, greenhouse gas emissions from the construction, operation, maintenance, and demolition of buildings and structures accounted for 37 percent of total energy and process-related CO_{2} emissions in 2021. Additionally, this sector contributes significantly to non-degradable waste. However, more and more construction companies diverge to a more sustainable and resilient construction when building new buildings or adapting existing buildings. Adapting existing buildings to make them greener or 'green retrofit' is also a more sustainable initiatives to minimize waste and cost of construction.

=== Addressing the impact of urban greening on housing affordability ===
One significant challenge facing green affordable housing initiatives is the phenomenon of urban greening (integration of green spaces and vegetation to improve the urban environment) which can lead to environmental gentrification. Environmental gentrification occurs when environmentally improved neighborhoods attract higher-income residents, which can cause displacement and augmentation of housing costs for existing low-income residents. Energy-efficient buildings, sustainable development projects and neighborhoods undergoing environmental improvements often become more attractive places to live, driving up property values, rent prices, and overall cost of living. However, urban greening can be a cause and effect of green gentrification as their relationship can be influenced by many factors such as "green space developments, including available suitable land, financial resources, political leadership, and policies and plans."

Additionally, green gentrification can directly affect the availability and affordability of existing housing stock. As property values rise, landlords may be incentivized to convert affordable rental units into higher-priced green housing or green luxury developments, displacing low-income residents in the process and reducing the number of existing affordable housings. This limits opportunities for low-income residents to access affordable housing options. It can also indirectly influence the development of new affordable housing in these neighborhoods. The demand for housing in environmentally improved areas or with green housing may attract developers who prioritize higher-end or market-rate housing, rather than affordable or subsidized housing options.

Efforts to address green gentrification and its impact on affordable housing require a collective approach that balances environmental sustainability with social equity. Policymakers, urban planners, and community stakeholders must implement strategies to preserve and expand affordable housing opportunities in environmentally improved neighborhoods. Strategies may include implementing inclusionary zoning policies, rent control measures, affordable housing mandates, and community land trusts to ensure that low-income residents can continue to afford housing in these areas.

By addressing the challenges of environmental gentrification and promoting affordable housing opportunities, stakeholders can work towards creating more inclusive, equitable, and sustainable communities where all residents can benefit from green affordable housing.

== See also ==
- Direct current buildings
- Urbanization
- Sustainable living
- Green infrastructure
- Climate change mitigation
- Placemaking
