= Baptist Joint Committee for Religious Liberty =

American nonprofit lobbying organization

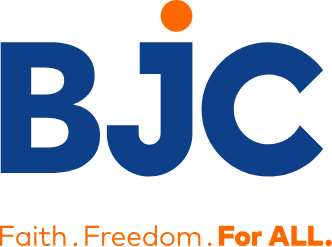
- Nickname: BJC
- Formation: 1936
- Tax ID no.: 53-0214244
- Legal status: 501(c)(3) nonprofit organization
- Headquarters: 500 New Jersey Avenue NW, Suite 750; Washington, DC 20001
- Coordinates: 38.892°N 77.0031°W
- Region served: United States
- Services: Advocacy, Education, Court Briefs
- Chair, Board of Directors: Jackie Moore (as of October 2019)
- Executive Director: Amanda Tyler
- Website: bjconline.org

The Baptist Joint Committee for Religious Liberty (BJC) is a US faith-based organization which focuses on upholding the historic Baptist principle of religious liberty.

With a staff of attorneys, public intellectuals, ministers and mobilizers, the Washington D.C.–based non-profit has a long history of advocating in the U.S. Supreme Court and working with Congress on issues relating to religious freedom and church-state separation.

The BJC analyzes new legal cases and legislation within the larger framework of how best to protect the First Amendment right to religious freedom for all. In recent years, the BJC has gone to the Supreme Court and filed amicus curiae (friend-of-the-court) briefs defending a potential employee's right to wear her hijab to work, opposing the travel ban, and opposing certain government-sponsored displays of religion, such as the giant free-standing cross in a government-owned intersection in Bladensburg, Maryland. On the legislation front, the BJC supports keeping the Johnson Amendment, which protects houses of worship.

The BJC has been an outspoken opponent of Christian nationalism and a supporter of religious minorities. The organization often partners with a diversity of religious groups – other Christians, as well as Jewish, Muslim, Hindu, Sikh and Seventh-day Adventist – and secular organizations in its advocacy work.

Amanda Tyler is the Executive Director and K. Hollyn (Holly) Hollman is the General Counsel and Associate Executive Director.

== History ==
The BJC traces its roots to 1936 when it was founded as the Southern Baptist Committee on Public Relations. After joining forces with American and National Baptists, the committee established offices in Washington, D.C., in 1946 and became the Baptist Joint Committee on Public Affairs.

Joseph Martin Dawson was elected the organization's first full-time Executive Director, a position he held until his retirement at age 75 on October 13, 1953. Other executive directors of the BJC have been C. Emanuel Carlson (1954–1971), James E. Wood Jr. (1972–1980), James M. Dunn (1981–1999), and J. Brent Walker (1999–2016). Current executive director Amanda Tyler began her tenure at the start of 2017.

Dawson's leadership led to several significant changes within the organization. One of the first was the introduction of the Report from the Capital, a periodical containing news and opinions of interest to politically minded Baptists. The first issue appeared in October 1946, and the BJC still publishes the Report as a source of views and analysis on church-state issues.

In 1979, a shift occurred when the Southern Baptist Convention elected Adrian Rogers as their new president. The BJC's relationship with the Convention got rockier throughout the 1980s. Prior to these years, resolutions had passed the annual meetings regularly expressing near-unanimous support for the BJC and its stands. But as the eighties brought charges of liberalism among the BJC staff on a variety of issues, then Executive Director James Dunn responded:

It's ... disingenuous to lament the "left-leaning" of the Baptist Joint Committee regarding issues on which we do not take a stand or lean at all ... The Baptist Joint Committee is chugging straight ahead on the course set in the 1980s by the members and staff of the BJCPA.

Throughout the controversy, Dunn's reputation was attacked repeatedly. An example comes from Paige Patterson: "[Dunn] hobnobs with the liberal establishment in the house and Senate ... That doesn't make us very happy either."

In 1990, the SBC reduced the BJC budget by 87%. A year later, at the 1991 annual meeting, all funding to the BJC was abolished in an amendment from Fred Minix of Virginia.

After the SBC withdrew its financial support, the Baptist Joint Committee received donations directly from several Southern Baptist state conventions, local churches, and individuals. The agency's other supporting bodies also helped make up the financial difference.

== Legislation ==
The organization's staff analyzes new legislation, testifies at hearings, and builds advocacy coalitions to sustain religious liberty. Recent examples include:

=== The Johnson Amendment ===
The BJC supports the Johnson Amendment, the provision in the US tax code that prohibits houses of worship and 501(c)(3) non-profits from partisan campaigning. In response to Trump's vow to "destroy" the Johnson Amendment and the administration's repeated attempts to repeal the law, the BJC helped bring together thousands of faith leaders and more than 100 denominations to sign letters to Congress asking to keep it.

=== Opposing school vouchers ===
The BJC has worked with religious, public education, and civil liberties groups to oppose publicly funded school voucher programs, arguing that religious teachings should be paid for by voluntary contributions, not through compulsory taxation.

=== Religious minorities ===
As part of its mandate to defend religious liberty for all, the BJC supports the Freedom of Religion Act, introduced in January 2019 in Congress, partly in response to Trump's travel ban. The legislation prohibits using immigrants' religion (or lack thereof) as a reason to keep them out of the U.S.

=== Government funding of faith-based organizations ===
The BJC believes it is important to protect the constitutional principle of barring the government from advancing religion, including funding it. Federal money, the BJC argues, should not go to rebuilding churches after a disaster, for example, or to a program that only serves Protestants: government-funded services must be available to all, regardless of religion. One long-standing staple of Establishment Clause law has been that the government does not fund religion. That responsibility is left to individual religious communities. Using taxpayer dollars to repair and rebuild houses of worship remains constitutionally problematic under the Establishment Clause as taxpayers should not be forced to build sanctuaries for religious teachings with which they disagree.

== Litigation ==
A significant part of the BJC's work has been its participation in religious liberty cases that are considered by various courts, particularly in the U.S. Supreme Court. The BJC engages in litigation by filing amicus curiae briefs, a term that means 'friend of the court'. Those briefs are filed to assist the court by providing support for specific points at issue in the dispute. Throughout the BJC's history, the organization has filed more than 140 legal briefs in court cases.

=== Large free-standing cross on government property ===
In American Legion v. American Humanist Association, the question for the U.S. Supreme Court concerned a free-standing 40-foot cross on government land in the middle of a major intersection in Bladensburg, Maryland. The BJC filed a brief arguing that the monument is unconstitutional because it represents a government endorsement of religion. In response to claims that the monument has an objective and secular meaning, the BJC countered, stating there is no more recognizable symbol of Christianity than the cross, and any attempt to deny it is offensive to Christians. On June 20, 2019, the Supreme Court ruled that the cross could remain, basing its decision on the particular history of that memorial monument.

=== Muslim ban ===
In Trump v. Hawaii, the Supreme Court addressed the White House's third attempt to limit immigration from certain Muslim-majority countries. The BJC argued that the government cannot enact laws designed to harm a specific religious group. But, in June 2018, the Court upheld the validity of the travel ban as within the president's immigration powers. The BJC continues its opposition.

=== Wedding cake for a same-sex couple's reception ===
Masterpiece Cakeshop v. Colorado Civil Rights Commission centered around a bakery owner's refusal to make a cake for the wedding reception of a same-sex couple based on his religious beliefs, despite a state law requiring that businesses open to the public not refuse service due to LGBT status. The BJC filed a brief on behalf of the state of Colorado, explaining that laws like this one – covering discrimination against "disability, race, [religion], colour, sex, sexual orientation, marital status, national origin, or ancestry" – protect religious liberty. Granting a broad exemption for this baker would open the door for other business owners to refuse service to customers in other protected categories based on the business owner's religious beliefs. For example, another commercial baker could use these same arguments to refuse to create a cake for an interfaith couple, an interracial couple or a couple where one had been previously divorced.

=== Religious headscarf in the workplace ===
In 2015, the BJC and 14 other religious groups joined to defend the right of a Muslim woman to wear her hijab at work in Equal Employment Opportunity Commission v. Abercrombie & Fitch Stores, Inc. The Supreme Court agreed.

== Advocacy and education ==
The BJC led a coalition of Christian organizations to create a way for Christians to take a stand against Christian nationalism and call out the threat it poses both to their faith and to democracy. On July 29, 2019, they launched ChristiansAgainstChristianNationalism.org, a grassroots movement standing against the political ideology of Christian nationalism. In 2022, the BJC together with the Freedom From Religion Foundation published a joint report on the role of Christian nationalism in the January 6, 2021 Capitol attack entitled "Christian nationalism and the January 6, 2021 Insurrection".

To promote its positions, the BJC publishes a wide array of materials relating to church-state separation, including significant coalition statements.

One of the most effective educating tools in recent years was "Religion in the Public Schools: A Joint Statement of Current Law." The BJC was a member of the document's drafting committee along with several leading organizations spanning the political spectrum – from the National Association of Evangelicals and the Christian Legal Society to the American Civil Liberties Union and the National Council of Churches. The document served as a resource for parents, students, teachers, and administrators throughout the United States and was later condensed and mailed to schools across the country by President Bill Clinton because of its accuracy and reliability.

=== Name changes ===
In 2005, the BJC name was changed to the Baptist Joint Committee for Religious Liberty to more accurately reflect their singular focus on religious liberty issues.

In 2019, the organization rebranded as BJC with the tagline Faith. Freedom. For All., to capture the inclusiveness of its mission and the relevancy of its work.

=== 75th anniversary ===
The Baptist Joint Committee celebrated its 75th anniversary in 2011 and released a special edition of Report from the Capital highlighting the history of the organization.
