= GoFundMe =

American crowdfunding platform

- Website type: Crowdfunding
- Available in: English
- Headquarters: Redwood City, California, U.S.
- Owners: GoFundMe, Inc.
- Creators: Brad Damphousse; Andrew Ballester
- CEO: Tim Cadogan
- Launched: May 10, 2010; 16 years ago
- Current status: Active

GoFundMe is an American for-profit crowdfunding platform that allows people to raise money for events ranging from life events such as celebrations and graduations to challenging circumstances like accidents and illnesses. From 2010 through early 2024, more than $30 billion has been raised on the platform, contributed by over 150 million donors.

== History ==
The company was founded in May 2010 by Brad Damphousse and Andrew Ballester. Both had previously founded Paygr, a website dedicated to allowing members to sell their services to the public. Damphousse and Ballester created the website under the name "CreateAFund" in 2008 but changed the name to GoFundMe after making numerous upgrades. The site was built off of PayPal's API. GoFundMe was founded in San Diego, California.

In March 2017, GoFundMe became the biggest crowdfunding platform, responsible for raising over $3 billion since its debut in 2010. The company receives over $140 million in donations per month and in 2016 made $100 million in revenue. In June 2015, it was announced that Damphousse and Ballester had agreed to sell a majority stake in GoFundMe to Accel Partners and Technology Crossover Ventures. Damphousse and Ballester stepped down from the company's day-to-day oversight. The deal valued GoFundMe at around $600 million. In January 2017, GoFundMe acquired CrowdRise. GoFundMe's CEO is Tim Cadogan. Ballester remains on the board of directors and holds an undisclosed stake in the company.

== Business model ==
Members describe their fundraising cause and the amount they hope to raise, and upload photos or video. Once the website is created, GoFundMe allows users to share their project with people through integrated social network links (Facebook, Twitter, etc.) and email. People can then donate to a user's cause through the website using a debit card or credit card and track the funding. Those who donate can also leave comments on the website. The person raising funds is not charged. Payment processors collect 2.9% and $0.30 from each GoFundMe transaction.

GoFundMe is unique to crowdfunding in that the company is not an incentive-based crowdfunding website. Although it does allow projects that are meant to fund other projects for musicians, inventors, etc., the business model is set up to allow for donations to personal causes and life events such as medical bills. GoFundMe also has a special section dedicated solely to users who are trying to raise money to cover their tuition costs. A prominent tuition project helped a user raise $25,000 for an out-of-state tuition to a PhD program. A 2014 tuition project raised over $100,000 for a homeless high school valedictorian to attend college and help his family.

GoFundMe targets social media platforms to create awareness for campaigns, and encourages individual users to promote their fundraiser on social media throughout a campaign. According to a 2018 report by GoFundMe based on past campaign data, a donor sharing a campaign on social media results in $15 of donations on average, while any share of a campaign on social media, regardless of whether the user donated to the campaign, results in $13 of donations on average.

In 2015, GoFundMe announced that it would no longer support legal defense funds after the site suspended funding for the defense of Sweet Cakes by Melissa, a bakery that was fined for refusing to bake a cake for a same-sex wedding. As of November 2017 GoFundMe's terms and conditions allow for campaigns for certain kinds of legal defense.

In November 2017, GoFundMe announced it would no longer charge a 5% fee per donation for US, Canada, and UK individual campaigns, and instead rely upon tips left by donors to support the website. The processing fee for online credit card payments still applies to donations.

In June 2019, GoFundMe terminated a $3 million fund-raiser for an Australian rugby player, Israel Folau, to finance a court case to appeal his multi-million dollar dismissal. He had quoted 1 Corinthians 6:9–10 on social media, which was said to be homophobic. An alternative fundraising site was set up by the Australian Christian Lobby with the public donating $2 million in 24 hours.

In May 2022, GoFundMe announced the acquisition of nonprofit donation site Classy. It was announced that Classy will remain and operate as a wholly owned subsidiary of GoFundMe.

=== Nonprofit pages ===
In October 2025, KGO-TV reported that GoFundMe had set up pages for 1.4 million nonprofit organizations without consulting with the nonprofits themselves or informing them. The organizations are able to claim these pages or unpublish them from the site. These actions raised concerns about transparency, donor trust, and crowding-out of direct donations.

In late October 2025, GoFundMe apologized for its actions and announced a change in policy that precluded future recurrence. The National Council of Nonprofits publicly addressed GoFundMe's apology saying they were "pleased with GoFundMe's openness and self-reflection", while still calling the original actions "a breach of trust".

== Notable projects ==
=== Medical fundraising ===
GoFundMe has described itself as the "leader in online medical fundraising". One in three campaigns is intended to raise funds for medical costs, with about 250,000 campaigns for a total of $650 million in contributions each year. This is partly attributed to the inadequacies of the U.S. healthcare system in which GoFundMe is used to bridge the gap.

CEO Rob Solomon has said: "When we started in 2010, it wasn't purposefully set up and built to be a substitute for medical insurance. We weren't ever set up to be a health care company and we still are not. But over time, people have used GoFundMe for the most important issues they are faced with." He added that the large medical fundraising is the result of severe problems in his country's healthcare system, saying: "The system is terrible [...] there are people who are not getting relief from us or from the institutions that are supposed to be there. We shouldn't be the solution to a complex set of systemic problems."

=== Official George Floyd Memorial Fund ===
After the murder of George Floyd, his brother Philonise Floyd established the fund "to cover funeral and burial expenses, mental and grief counseling, lodging and travel for all court proceedings, and to assist our family in the days to come as we continue to seek justice for George. A portion of these funds will also go to the Estate of George Floyd for the benefit and care of his children and their educational fund." One week after the tragedy and only four days after the start of the fund, it had already raised $7 million, putting it in ranking as one of the most highly funded GoFundMe campaigns to date.

=== The $1K Project ===
Created by entrepreneurs and investors Alex Iskold and Minda Brusse in response to the novel coronavirus pandemic, The $1K Project uses individual GoFundMe pages to match specific donors with specific families who have been adversely affected by the pandemic. Donors agree to contribute a minimum of $1,000 per month for three months, for a total of $3,000 per family. Small-dollar donors can make contributions that are pooled together and then matched to a family. In August 2020, Andrew Yang's Humanity Forward Foundation committed to matching donations, dollar-for-dollar, up to $1 million. As of mid-October 2020, more than 800 families had been fully funded.

=== Sweet Cakes By Melissa ===
In 2015, after the site suspended funding for the defense of Sweet Cakes by Melissa, a bakery that was fined for refusing to bake a cake for a same-sex wedding, GoFundMe announced that the site would no longer support legal defense funds on their platform. As of November 2017 GoFundMe's terms and conditions allow for campaigns for certain kinds of legal defense.

=== Help Chelsea Manning Pay Her Court Fines ===
Created by Kelly Wright to raise money to help former intelligence analyst and whistleblower Chelsea Manning pay $256,000 in court fines levied against her after her refusal to testify to a grand jury about WikiLeaks founder Julian Assange. Nearly 7,000 contributions ranging from $5 to $10,000 were made within two days.

=== Charity fraud ===
==== MMS Defense Fund ====
Nominally a legal defense fund for Louis Daniel Smith, who faced criminal charges in relation to him selling "MMS" (Miracle Mineral Supplement). On May 27, 2015, Smith was found guilty of fraud and other charges. On May 31, 2015, the mmsdefensefund was removed from GoFundMe (an archived copy is available).

==== Paying it Forward ====
This fundraiser was created by Kate McClure, Mark D'Amico, and Johnny Bobbitt Jr. to defraud people. Their fictitious story was that Bobbitt, a homeless veteran, spent his last $20 to assist McClure on the highway when her car ran out of gasoline. Widely reported in the US and internationally, it exceeded its goal by 4000% but when they began publicly squabbling for the money, an investigation was launched and all three were arrested and charged with theft by deception. They pleaded guilty and were sentenced to one year and a day, five years and five-year special probation, respectively.

==== We The People Built the Wall! ====
Created with the goal of building a wall as private citizens to inhibit illegal entry along the Mexico–United States border. The founder, Brian Kolfage started a nonprofit with the money, We Build the Wall, which has constructed sections of the wall. Currently most money raised on GoFundMe, but in August 2020, Kolfage was indicted, along with Steve Bannon and two other co-defendants, on federal charges of defrauding hundreds of thousands of "We Build the Wall" donors by diverting money that was raised to personal use. Federal prosecutors said that despite "repeatedly assuring donors" that Kolfage would not be paid, the defendants engaged in a scheme to divert $350,000 to Kolfage, "which he used to fund his lavish lifestyle." He was separately indicted in May 2021 on federal charges of defrauding the IRS and filing false tax returns.

=== For victims of mass shootings in the U.S. ===
==== Bucks for Bauman ====
This project was created for Jeff Bauman after he lost both legs during the Boston Marathon bombing.

==== Celeste & Sydney Recovery Fund ====
Celeste and Sydney Corcoran were both victims of the Boston Marathon bombing: Sydney suffered severe injuries as a result of being hit with shrapnel, and Celeste lost both legs below her knees. This campaign page was created for their ongoing rehabilitation.

==== Support Victims of Pulse Shooting ====
This fundraiser was created by Equality Florida to help the victims of a nightclub shooting in Orlando, Florida. Over 90,000 people have contributed to this campaign. GoFundMe headquarters donated $100,000 and waived every transaction fee for this campaign.

==== Las Vegas Victims Fund ====
This fundraiser was created to help the victims of a mass shooting from the Las Vegas Strip in Paradise, Nevada.

==== Stoneman Douglas Victims' Fund ====
There are a number of fundraisers for individual victims of the February 14, 2018, Stoneman Douglas High School Shooting in Parkland, Florida to help survivors' recovery and to fund causes chosen by family members in honor of the deceased.

=== Canada convoy protest ===
In January 2022, Prime Minister Justin Trudeau announced that truck drivers crossing into Canada would have to be fully vaccinated. In response, some truckers organized a convoy to Ottawa under the name Freedom Convoy 2022. A GoFundMe project was then created with the claim of raising money for fuel and food for the convoy. On February 4, 2022, GoFundMe announced the fundraiser had been removed from the platform for violating terms of service, specifically "violence and other unlawful activity". The company initially stated that $9 million in donations from the fundraiser would be redistributed to "credible and established charities" and would only be refunded upon application, subject to a two-week time limit. Following criticism, the company subsequently stated on Twitter that all donations would be refunded within 10 business days.

=== Anti-vaccine fundraisers ===
In March 2019, GoFundMe banned fundraisers from anti-vaccine activists, including Stop Mandatory Vaccination founder Larry Cook, citing violations of their terms of service. Despite the ban, The Independent found that several anti-vaccine campaigns were still running on GoFundMe as of May 2019.

In December 2021, The Sunday Times reported that GoFundMe had enabled the donation of over €300,000 to anti-vaccine campaigns and challenges to vaccine certificates.

In January 2023, the British disinformation analysis organization Logically reported that GoFundMe had funneled over $330,000 in donations to fundraisers for injuries supposedly caused by the COVID-19 vaccine.

=== Jean Messiha's fundraising ===
On Tuesday, 27 June 2023, 17-year-old Nahel Merzouk was killed by a French police officer after he failed to comply with traffic stops. While the police officer has been arrested on suspicion of "voluntary homicide by a person in authority", far-right activist Jean Messiha organised a controversial crowdfunding in favour of the police officer's family which reached €1.6 million. The killing sparked widespread protests and riots in France. Nahel Merzouk's family has filed a complaint against Jean Messiha.

=== Grayzone donations freeze ===
In August 2023, GoFundMe froze more than $90,000 from 1,100 contributors to The Grayzone, citing unspecified "external concerns". Grayzone founder Max Blumenthal said he believed the concerns were political and related to the platform's coverage of the Russian invasion of Ukraine.

=== Alleged shooter of Brian Thompson ===
In December 2024, multiple campaigns for the legal defense fund of the alleged shooter involved in the killing of UnitedHealthCare CEO Brian Thompson were removed. However, a GiveSendGo fundraiser remained live, and has raised over $125,000 as of December 16.

=== Abundant Life Christian School shooting ===
A fundraiser campaign for victims of the Abundant Life Christian School shooting was started by April Landphier, a parent of a student of the Abundant Life Christian School sister school Lighthouse Christian School. It received $80 in its first 24 hours. As of December 18, it has raised $260.

== List of projects ==
Unless otherwise stated, the following amounts are in US dollars. Days raised is the number of days between Date raised and As of.

Project	Amount raised	Target amount	Success rate	As of	Date raised	Days raised	Status
Support For Butler PA Victims - President Trump Authorized	$5,399,200 USD	$1,000,000 USD	539.92%	July 19, 2024	July 13, 2024		Active
Freedom Convoy 2022 - Canada	$7,893,526 USD ($10,003,900 CAD)	$150000 USD ($200000 CAD)	5,001.95%	February 2, 2022	January 14, 2022	19	Terminated
Official George Floyd Memorial Fund	$14,595,200	$1,500,000	973.01%	July 10, 2020	May 28, 2020		Terminated
Help the Anwars Find Peace	$1,051,250			April 1, 2021	March 24, 2021		Active
The $1K Project		$2,500,000		October 14, 2020	April 9, 2020		Active
America's Food Fund	$45,155,532			April 6, 2022	April 1, 2020	735	Terminated
Stand With Ukraine	$37,059,792	$30,000,000	123.53%		March 2, 2022		Active
Help Chelsea Manning Pay Her Court Fines	$267,000	$256,000	104.30%	March 14, 2020	March 12, 2020	2	Terminated
Buffalo 5-14 Survivors Fund	$5,539,786			September 20, 2022	May 16, 2022	127	Terminated
Coronavirus, rafforziamo la terapia intensiva	$4,271,200USD (€3,800,000)	$224,800USD (€200,000)	1,900.00%	March 12, 2020	March 9, 2020	3	Terminated
Texas Elementary School School Shooting Victims Fund	$6,527,700	$6,400,000	102.00%	September 26, 2022	May 24, 2022	125	Terminated
Help KyoAni Heal	$2,369,520	$750,000	315.94%	August 1, 2019	July 18, 2019	14	Terminated
We The People Built the Wall!	$25,462,400	$1,000,000,000	2.50%	February 26, 2020	December 16, 2018	215	Terminated
Children Lost Both Parents In Wreck	$500,075	$7,000	7,142.86%	May 31, 2020	November 3, 2015	0	Active
Navajo & Hopi Families COVID-19 Relief Fund	$8,116,169	$13,000,000	62.43%		March 15, 2020		Active
Support for FBI Veteran Pete Strzok	$448,357	$500,000	89.67%	January 17, 2019	August 13, 2018	157	Active
Funds for Humboldt Broncos	$15,172,213			April 19, 2018	April 6, 2018	13	Terminated
In memory of HyunJungKim to support my brother & I	$2,927,488	$20,000			March 18, 2021		Active
March for Our Lives	$3,531,110			April 12, 2018	February 18, 2018	53	Unknown
Stoneman Douglas Victims' Fund	$10,102,857	$10,000,000	0.00%	June 30, 2018	February 15, 2018	135	Terminated
Time's Up Legal Defense Fund	$24,256,172	$24,500,000	99.00%	May 29, 2019	December 20, 2017	525	Terminated
William Osman's Fire Relief	$172,471	$10,000	1,724.71%	June 17, 2018	December 5, 2017	194	Unknown
Paying it Forward	$402,826				November 10, 2017		Unknown
Las Vegas Victims' Fund	$11,874,100	$15,000,000	79.16%	April 12, 2018	October 2, 2017	192	Active
Justice for Breonna Taylor (official)	$6,856,608				June 2, 2020		Active
Students with Puerto Rico	$216,180	$150,000	144.12%	December 31, 2018	September 20, 2017	467	Active
Stefan Karl's Year of Healing	$169,670				October 10, 2016		Unknown
Support Victims of Pulse Shooting	$7,853,140	$10,000,000	78.53%	September 30, 2018	June 12, 2016	840	Active
Support The Grimmie Family	$192,396			June 26, 2016	June 11, 2016	15	Unknown
Saving Eliza	$2,025,540	$4,000,000	50.64%	January 5, 2016	April 18, 2015	262	Terminated
Saving Eliza Continued	$2,115,870	$3,000,000	70.53%	July 19, 2019	September 29, 2017	658	Active
mmsdefensefund	$131,796	$200,000	65.90%	May 27, 2015	December 17, 2014	161	Unknown
Support Officer Wilson	$183,259	$250,000	73.30%	August 27, 2014	August 27, 2014	0	Unknown
Homeless Valedictorian College Fund	$105,000	$60,000	175.00%	May 10, 2014	July 7, 2014	58	Terminated
Build Barbara Garcia a Home	$73,810				May 21, 2013		Unknown
Bucks for Bauman!	$810,230	$1,000,000	81.02%	July 19, 2019	April 16, 2013	2,285	Terminated
Celeste & Sydney Recovery Fund	$797,430	$1,000,000	79.74%	July 19, 2019	April 16, 2013	2,285	Active
Emily Scott's Dream 2014 Sochi, Russia	$59,380	$15,000	395.87%		April 12, 2013		Active
Voddie Baucham's Medical Expense Fund	$1,073,180	$1,250,000	85.85%	February 16, 2021	February 13, 2021	3	Active
The Chasing M's Foundation Community Toy Drive	$8,980,850	$2,500	345,659.20%	January 9, 2023	January 1, 2020		Active
The Family of Arlene Connolly O'Neill	$349,294	$500,000		October 16, 2024		1	Active
