= Amanda Tyler =

American lawyer and executive

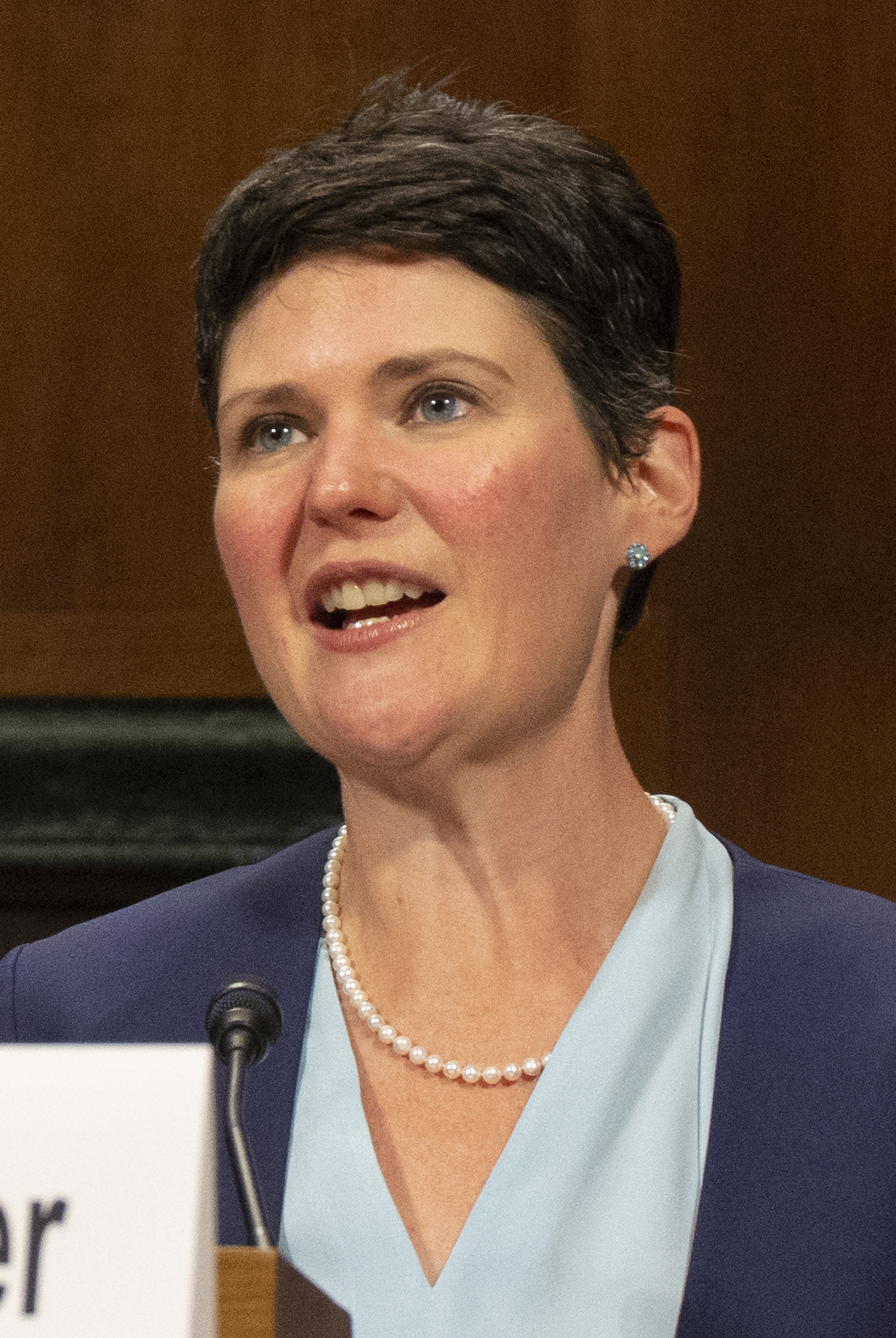
- Tyler in 2018
- Born: 1976 or 1977 (age 48–49); Austin, Texas, U.S.
- Education: Georgetown University (BA); University of Texas, Austin (JD)

Amanda R. Tyler (born 1976/1977) is an American lawyer and executive. She is the executive director of the Baptist Joint Committee for Religious Liberty (BJC) in Washington, D.C., a nonprofit whose focus is defending religious freedom for all people. In addition, she serves as the co-host of the BJC's "Respecting Religion" podcast series, alongside BJC General Counsel Holly Hollman. Tyler is the sixth executive director of the organization since its founding in 1936 and the first woman to hold the post.

Under her leadership, BJC has opposed the Muslim travel ban and Christian nationalism, and supported the protections of the Johnson Amendment.

== Early life and education ==
Tyler was born and raised in Austin, Texas. She graduated magna cum laude from the Edmund A. Walsh School of Foreign Service at Georgetown University in 2000 with a bachelor's degree in foreign service. She earned her J.D. with honors in 2004 from the University of Texas School of Law.

== Career ==
While in college, Tyler worked as an intern at BJC and then joined the staff as the assistant to the general counsel. During that time, she assisted with the coordination of a coalition in support of the Religious Land Use and Institutionalized Persons Act (RLUIPA), which was signed into law in 2000 by President Bill Clinton.

Following her graduation, Tyler worked as an associate at Baron & Budd in Dallas, and then Lynn Tillotson Pinker & Cox (now Lynn Pinker Cox & Hurst). She completed a one-year clerkship for The Honorable Barbara M.G. Lynn of the U.S. District Court for the Northern District of Texas.

In 2009, Tyler joined the staff of U.S. Rep. Lloyd Doggett in Austin as district director and moved to Washington, D.C. in 2012 to serve as his counsel for the Ways and Means Committee. She held this position until January 2017 when she took up the position of executive director of BJC.

=== Writings ===
Tyler is the author of How to End Christian Nationalism, released by Broadleaf Books on October 22, 2024.

=== Congressional and media appearances ===
Tyler has testified before Congress numerous times. On October 25, 2023, Tyler testified before the U.S. House Oversight Committee’s Subcommittee on National Security, the Border, and Foreign Affairs, during their hearing titled “Faith Under Fire: An Examination of Global Religious Persecution.” On December 13, 2022, she testified before the House Oversight Committee’s Subcommittee on Civil Rights and Civil Liberties, during their hearing on "Confronting White Supremacy (Part 7): The Evolution of Anti-Democratic Extremist Groups and the Ongoing Threat to Democracy." On October 2, 2018, Tyler testified before the Senate Judiciary Committee on the current challenges to religious freedom.

Tyler submitted written testimony to Congress on May 4, 2017, objecting to a proposed repeal of the Johnson Amendment - the law that protects houses of worship and other religious nonprofit organizations from the political pressures that come with endorsing and opposing candidates.

Op-eds by Tyler have been published in The Washington Post, The Hill, and Religious News Service.

== Awards and recognition ==
Tyler was named one of the top 50 nonprofit leaders in the country in 2018 by The NonProfit Times.

BJC received the Judge George Alexander Teitz Award from the Touro Synagogue in 2018 for best exemplifying the commitment to the ideals of religious and ethnic tolerance and freedom, expressed in President George Washington's 1790 Letter “to the Hebrew Congregation in Newport, Rhode Island.”

In 2019, Tyler was named the young alumna of the year by the University of Texas School of Law.

EthicsDaily.com named Tyler "Baptist of the Year" in 2019 for her leadership of the Christians Against Christian Nationalism campaign.

== Personal life ==
Tyler and her husband have one son. She and her family live in Texas.
