= Diane Yentel =

American housing policy advocate and nonprofit executive

President and CEO of the National Council of Nonprofits
- Incumbent
- Assumed office January 13, 2025
- Preceded by: Tim Delaney

President and CEO of the National Low Income Housing Coalition
- In office April 6, 2016 – 2025
- Preceded by: Sheila Crowley

Personal details
- Citizenship: American
- Education: Stony Brook University; University of Texas at Austin (MSW)
- Occupation: Housing policy advocate, nonprofit executive

Diane Yentel is an American housing policy advocate and nonprofit executive. She led the National Low Income Housing Coalition (NLIHC) as president and chief executive officer from 2016 to 2025, and in January 2025 became president and CEO of the National Council of Nonprofits.

== Early life and education ==
Yentel earned her undergraduate degree at the State University of New York at Stony Brook, then served in the Peace Corps as a community development specialist in Zambia from 1995 to 1998. She holds a master's degree in social work from the University of Texas at Austin.

== Career ==
Yentel worked as a housing policy coordinator for the Massachusetts Coalition for the Homeless. Her first Washington job was at NLIHC, where she worked as a policy analyst from 2005 to 2008 and led the coalition's advocacy on federal housing aid after Hurricane Katrina. She also worked as a senior domestic policy advisor at Oxfam America.

At the Department of Housing and Urban Development, Yentel directed the Public Housing Management and Occupancy Division in the Office of Public and Indian Housing. There she worked with senior department officials to develop the Rental Assistance Demonstration, a program that uses private capital to rehabilitate and preserve public housing. She left HUD in 2011 for Enterprise Community Partners, joining as director of public policy and government affairs and later becoming vice president of public policy, in charge of the organization's federal, state and local policy, research and advocacy work.

NLIHC's board named Yentel president and CEO in February 2016, succeeding Sheila Crowley, who was retiring. She took over on April 6, 2016.

In December 2023, Yentel testified before the House Financial Services Subcommittee on Housing and Insurance at a hearing on housing affordability. She told the subcommittee that the country was short 7.3 million homes affordable and available to its lowest-income renters, and that Congress funded housing assistance for only one in four eligible households. She asked Congress to make rental assistance available to every eligible household, to fund the national Housing Trust Fund at no less than $40 billion a year, and to tie federal transportation and infrastructure money to the loosening of restrictive local zoning.

=== National Council of Nonprofits and lawsuits against Trump administration ===
The National Council of Nonprofits chose Yentel from more than 800 applicants to replace Tim Delaney, and she started on January 13, 2025. Two weeks later, the Office of Management and Budget ordered a freeze on federal grants and loans. Yentel called the order a potential "five-alarm fire" for nonprofits, and the council became the lead plaintiff in a suit filed by Democracy Forward alongside the American Public Health Association, Main Street Alliance and SAGE. Judge Loren AliKhan blocked the freeze with a preliminary injunction on February 25, 2025. Within her first four months the council had joined two lawsuits against the Trump administration.
