= J. Brent Walker =

- Born: James Brent Walker; September 13, 1950 (age 76)
- Education: University of Florida (B.A., M.A.); Southern Baptist Theological Seminary (M.Div.); Stetson University College of Law (J.D.)
- Occupation: Lawyer/Minister/Executive Director Emeritus of BJC
- Spouse: Nancy Fuller Walker

James Brent Walker (born September 13, 1950) is the former Executive Director of the Baptist Joint Committee for Religious Liberty, a leading church-state advocacy group. He holds professional designations as a member of the Bar of the Supreme Court of the United States and an ordained Baptist minister. After retirement from the BJC, he served as Interim President of the John Leland Center for Theological Studies in Arlington, Virginia, until the end of 2018.

Walker holds a Master of Divinity (M.Div.) degree from Southern Baptist Theological Seminary in Louisville, Kentucky, a Juris Doctor degree from the Stetson University College of Law, and undergraduate and graduate degrees from the University of Florida. Walker received an honorary Doctor of Divinity degree from the John Leland Center for Theological Studies in 2013. He was a Baptist minister in Falmouth, Kentucky, and taught law at Georgetown University Law Center. From 2003 to 2016, he served as an adjunct professor at the Baptist Theological Seminary at Richmond.

== Career ==
After law school, Walker eventually became a partner in the law firm of Carlton Fields in Tampa, Florida. Walker left the firm in 1986 to enter Southern Baptist Theological Seminary in Louisville where he earned a Master of Divinity degree and was named the most outstanding graduate. He pastored the Richland Baptist Church in Falmouth, Kentucky, before coming to the Baptist Joint Committee for Religious Liberty (BJC).

Walker first served the BJC as its associate general counsel from 1989 to 1993, and then as general counsel from 1993 to 1999. In 1999—upon the retirement of James Dunn—Walker was named executive director of the organization, whose mission is "to defend and extend God-given religious liberty for all, furthering the Baptist heritage that champions the principle that religion must be freely exercised, neither advanced nor inhibited by government." Walker retired from the BJC on Dec. 31, 2016, and was succeeded by Amanda Tyler.

After retirement, Walker served as Interim President of the John Leland Center for Theological Studies until the end of 2018.

Walker routinely speaks in churches and denominational gatherings. He has been published widely and routinely provides commentary on church-state issues in the national media. He has been quoted by numerous national publications and has appeared on CNN's Talk Back Live, NBC's "Today" show, MSNBC's "Hardball with Chris Matthews," Fox Morning News, Fox News Channel's "The O'Reilly Factor," and National Public Radio's "Morning Edition" and "All Things Considered."

== Awards ==
Throughout his career, Walker has received numerous awards, including the Virginia First Freedom Award, the Adrian Westney Religious Liberty Award from the Seventh-day Adventist Church, and an honorary Doctor of Divinity Degree from John Leland Center for Theological Studies. In 2017, Walker received the Distinguished Alumnus Award from the University of Florida, one of the highest honors bestowed by the university.

== Bibliography ==
- What a Touchy Subject! Religious Liberty and Church-State Separation. Nurturing Faith, 2014.
- Church-State Matters: Fighting for Religious Liberty in Our Nation's Capital. Mercer University Press, 2008.
- James Dunn: Champion for Religious Liberty. Smyth & Helwys, 1999.
