= Housing quality and health outcomes in the United States =

Housing quality and health outcomes in the United States are inextricably linked. Research has identified a correlation between substandard housing conditions including poor ventilation, lead exposure, and structural hazards, to damaging effects like respiratory illness, injuries, mental health disorders, and chronic diseases.

Public health organizations such as the World Health Organization (WHO) and the Centers for Disease Control and Prevention (CDC) acknowledge housing as a key social determinant of health. The environmental stress framework suggests that substandard housing functions as a chronic stressor, influencing psychological and physiological responses over time. This framework helps explain how seemingly "invisible" stressors tied to housing—such as lack of privacy or exposure to noise—can yield long-term health effects. The COVID-19 pandemic further exposed housing-related health disparities. Overcrowded conditions contributed to higher infection rates and worsened housing instability.Climate change is also increasing housing-related health risks. Rising temperatures and poor insulation contribute to heat-related illnesses, while extreme weather events such as flooding exacerbate mold-related respiratory conditions. Low-income communities are particularly vulnerable due to limited access to climate-resilient housing and infrastructure.

Federal and State initiatives, such as Housing Choice Voucher Program (Section 8) and Low-Income Home Energy Assistance Program (LIHEAP) aim to address inadequate housing conditions. Despite these programs, disparities in housing quality persist across regions and demographic groups.

== Background ==
According to the World Health Organization, housing should provide:

- protection against communicable diseases
- protection against injury, poisoning, and chronic diseases
- and reduce psychological and social stresses to a minimum

In addition to these standards, public health researchers identify three main pillars to healthy housing systems: affordability, security and suitability. These pillars influence both the conditions of home environments and the distribution of housing quality across populations. Affordability refers to the cost of housing in relation to household income, which affects access to safe and adequate living conditions. Security relates to housing stability and protection from involuntary eviction or relocation. Suitability focuses on whether a residence meets the physical, spatial, and functional needs of its occupants.

If one of the three pillars is compromised, health disparities tend to widen across populations. The impact extends beyond the physical structure of the home. When housing is unaffordable, households may face financial strain that limits spending on food, medical care, or utilities, which contributes to chronic stress and poorer health. Lack of security, including frequent moves or the risk of eviction, disrupts stability and can worsen both mental and physical health. Housing that is unsuitable, such as homes with structural hazards, overcrowding, or inadequate ventilation, exposes residents to environmental risks linked to respiratory illnesses, injuries, and other chronic conditions. Public health frameworks emphasize that affordable, secure, and suitable housing collectively form the basis of healthy living conditions, and when any pillar is missing, health outcomes are affected.

The United States Department of Housing and Urban Development (HUD) 2007 American Housing Survey determined that 6 million households live with moderate or severe physical housing problems. Homes that are lacking toilets, have faulty or unreliable heating systems, or have exposed electrical wiring do not protect inhabitants from disease and injury and can cause serious psychological stress are categorized as being "severe" housing problems. "Moderate" housing problems are things such as having unvented gas, oil, or kerosene as the primary heating source, or lacking a kitchen sink. The lack of commonplace appliances like a furnace or sink can expose inhabitants to diseases and injury.

The U.S. Census Bureau gathers data on several factors related to the housing: plumbing, heating, hallways, upkeep, electric service and kitchen equipment. As many as 24 million households have lead-based paint hazards. Maintenance and upkeep of public and low-income housing remains a major issue, leading to chronic problems of water infiltration, pest infestation and unsafe physical conditions. The disproportionate burden of these problems falls to children, the elderly and those with chronic illnesses, and minorities.

== Neighborhoods ==
Housing quality is also an indicator of neighborhood conditions. Neighborhoods that are seen as bad or deteriorating are often characterized by the conditions of the housing in that neighborhood. Poor neighborhood conditions can be defined as having abandoned buildings, vacant lots, no access to quality schools, and high levels of poverty. These neighborhood dynamics can contribute to a person's psychological and social stress. For example, individuals residing in neighborhoods with poor conditions face an increased risk of adverse mental health outcomes, including psychological distress, anxiety, depression, substance use, and suicide. A tool that further identifies the relationship between health disparities and their built environment is the use of Geographic information systems. This spatial analysis tool is used to map these neighborhood-level risks, allowing them to visualize patterns such as clusters of substandard housing, environmental hazards, and resource disparities. Geographic information system data helps identify which neighborhoods face the greatest exposure to harmful conditions, guiding targeted public health and housing interventions.

In addition to physical and environmental factors, housing quality within neighborhoods is also influenced by how problems are identified and addressed by local enforcement systems. In many cities, housing inspections are primarily initiated by tenants complaining, which can result in uneven identification of housing hazards across neighborhoods. Residents in low-income or marginalized communities may be less likely to report housing violations due to limited awareness of their rights or fear of retaliation, allowing some hazards to remain for longer periods.

In low-income neighborhoods crime and noxious noise and odors can force individuals to isolate in substandard homes, which often characterize low-income neighborhoods. The combination of avoiding outside activity and isolating in dangerous living spaces leads to negative health outcomes such as obesity, lead poisoning, and asthma.

Migrant and refugee populations in the United States often face significant housing challenges that contribute to poor health outcomes. Many are placed in overcrowded or substandard units, often due to limited income, language barriers, or discriminatory housing practices. Migrants, especially those with undocumented status, may avoid seeking assistance for fear of deportation, leading to chronic exposure to unsafe conditions. Refugees resettled through federal programs may initially receive temporary housing assistance, but this support is time-limited, and many struggle to transition to long-term stable housing.

Studies have shown that these populations experience higher rates of respiratory illness, mental health disorders, and injury related to their living conditions. Children in migrant households are especially vulnerable to poor housing quality, with evidence linking housing instability to developmental delays and school absenteeism. Addressing these disparities requires culturally competent housing policy that acknowledges the unique needs of displaced populations.

== History ==
Housing quality has greatly improved since the beginning of the 20th century. Today close to 6 million American live in severe or moderate housing conditions. The majority of those living in these extreme housing conditions are minorities and renters. Historic patterns of disinvestment and housing policy decisions have contributed to disparities in housing quality across U.S. neighborhoods. Historical patterns in federal housing policy contributed to the expansion of suburban development, while many inner-city areas, often home to predominantly minority populations, experienced lower levels of investment and support for housing infrastructure, leading to increased housing insecurity.

After World War II, the Federal Housing Administration (FHA) played a major part in influencing those with the means to leave the inner city for the suburbs. According to Schwartz, the FHA gave preferential treatment to insuring mortgages in the suburbs rather than the inner city. Inner-city neighborhoods, particularly those with predominantly Black populations, faced disinvestment and reduced mortgage access. These patterns contributed to housing insecurity and neighborhood decline in many urban areas.

The COVID-19 pandemic significantly affected housing stability and public health in the United States. During the early stages of the pandemic, federal and state-level eviction moratoriums temporarily reduced housing displacement. Once these protections expired, eviction rates surged past pre-pandemic levels in many cities. Housing conditions also influenced the spread and severity of COVID-19. Research has shown that overcrowded living spaces and inadequate ventilation increased transmission risks. Households experiencing housing instability were also more likely to face challenges in accessing healthcare, social distancing, and maintaining mental well-being during lock downs. In response, government programs such as the Emergency Rental Assistance (ERA) program were introduced to provide temporary financial relief to tenants. The long-term impact of the pandemic on housing security remains a concern, particularly for low-income and minority communities disproportionately affected by housing instability.

== Statistics ==
Poor housing conditions are often influenced by race and geography. Marginalized groups such as Black and Hispanic individuals are more likely to experience substandard housing compared to their White counterparts. Additionally, poor housing conditions are disproportionately prevalent in inner cities and rural areas, rather than in suburban regions. Inner-city minorities tend to have poorer health outcomes compared to suburban Whites. Black homeowners are more likely than Hispanic and white homeowners to experience severe and moderate housing problems; 2.1% of all homeowners have moderate housing quality problems; 5.9% of Black homeowners and 3.8% of Hispanic homeowners experience moderate housing quality problems.

Black renters are more likely than Hispanics and whites to experience severe and moderate housing conditions. 6.9% of all renters have moderate housing quality problems; 7.9% of Black renters and 7.1% of Hispanic renters. 3.1% of all renters have severe housing problems; 4.2% of Black renters and 3.4% of Hispanic renters.

Homeowners and renters in central cities and rural areas are more likely than homeowners and renters in the suburbs to experience severe or moderate housing problems. Of those with severe housing problems, 20% more were in central cities and 10% more were located in rural areas than in suburban areas. Of those with severe housing problems, nearly 20% more were located in central cities.

Socioeconomic status and historical housing policies help explain why marginalized racial and ethnic groups disproportionately experience substandard housing. Discriminatory practices such as redlining, exclusionary zoning, and unequal access to mortgage lending contributed to racial residential segregation and limited opportunities for homeownership among Black and Hispanic families. As a result, many households from these groups were historically concentrated in under-resourced neighborhoods with aging infrastructure and limited investment. These structural disadvantages persist today, with income inequality and wealth gaps further limiting housing options for many low-income and minority residents.

== Specific health outcomes ==
Substandard housing quality can have detrimental impacts on the physical and mental health of residents. In the United States, high-quality housing has become difficult to afford and access. Because of the inaccessibility, many individuals and families settle to build homes in spaces with poor living conditions. As of 2017, 8.3 million homes were considered homes with "worst case needs." This number is describing the amount of rental households which are occupied by individuals with extremely low incomes, and living in severely inadequate conditions. Characteristics of inadequate housing include spaces with poor ventilation or leaks, peeling paint or cracked walls and ceilings, faulty smoke alarms, and deficiencies in heating, electricity and plumbing.

Individuals and families living in spaces that exhibit these characteristics face a heightened risk of experiencing poor health. Residing in poorly ventilated homes can increase risks of respiratory illnesses. Additionally, poor ventilation can increase the likelihood residents will be exposed to mold, and other allergens, of which can have significant health impacts, increasing the risk of experiencing negative health effects. In addition to the physical health impacts experienced by residents in poorly maintained spaces, these individuals and families also suffer from stress and anxiety caused by their living conditions.

Evaluating the quality of housing, and recognizing its inadequacies, is an essential aspect of ensuring the health and safety of people within their homes. Additionally, recognizing the correlation between poor housing quality and poor health helps to determine the location of investment initiatives by providing information on where funds are most needed.

=== Climate change and housing ===
Climate change has emerged as a significant factor influencing housing quality and public health. Research indicates that rising global temperatures, increased, flooding, and worsening air quality have disproportionately affected low-income housing communities.

==== Extreme heat and energy inefficiency ====
Poorly insulated housing contributes to heat stress, especially in urban areas where the urban heat island effect amplifies temperature extremes. A lack of air conditioning or proper ventilation has been linked to increased hospitalizations for heat-related illness. Programs aimed at retrofitting homes with insulation and energy-efficient cooling systems have shown positive health outcomes.

==== Flooding and mold growth ====
More frequent and severe storms have led to increased flooding, particularly in coastal and low-income neighborhoods. Flooded homes are prone to mold and damp conditions, which exacerbate respiratory diseases such as asthma. Flooding can also heighten existing problems with plumbing or HVAC systems, leading to persistent moisture inside the home. These damp environments support the growth of biological agents including dust mites, bacteria, and cockroaches, all of which are associated with allergic and respiratory symptoms. Poor ventilation further reduces indoor air quality by trapping humidity and allowing mold to develop.

==== Air pollution and respiratory disease ====
Climate change has also worsened air pollution, contributing to increased rates of asthma and other respiratory conditions. Low-income housing is often situated near industrial areas, exposing residents to elevated levels of pollutants such as particulate matter (PM2.5).

=== Asthma and respiratory illnesses ===
Asthma is a major cause for childhood hospitalizations and absenteeism from schools. Asthmatic children living in homes with cockroaches, mice and mold may be especially prone to episodes requiring medical care. The National Center for Healthy Housing reports that about 20–30 percent of asthma cases are linked to home environmental conditions. Direct health care costs of asthma totaled more than $14.7 billion in 2008. $5 billion annually in indirect costs, primarily from lost productivity, can be added to the total. According to the Centers for Disease Control and Prevention, almost 13 million lost school days, 4 million asthma attacks and nearly 4,000 deaths yearly are associated with asthma. Water infiltration and poor ventilation increases the likelihood that moisture will be an issue in a home, which can lead to infestation of pests and to mold growth, known triggers of allergies and asthma.

=== Lead ===
High lead levels (blood levels ≥10 micrograms per deciliter) are associated with a number of poor health outcomes, including: learning disabilities, behavioral and neurological problems, and, in severe cases, death. Even relatively low blood lead levels can have negative health impacts. The impact on the individual and on society in terms of lost potential can be dramatic. Those living in older, poorly maintained housing are at the greatest risk, and many of these housing units are home to low-income families Even though blood levels are dropping in much of the population in the United States, the poorest children remain at the greatest risk because they are most likely to live in older, poorly maintained housing.

=== Unintentional injuries ===
Unintentional injury is the leading cause of death among children under the age of 15. Deaths from residential injuries accounted for an average of 2,822 deaths annually from 1985 to 1997. The rates of death associated with residential injury are equally significant amongst those aged 65 and older. Poorly maintained stairs, sidewalks, bad lighting, and inadequate facilities for people with limited mobility or sensory impairments are all implicated in injury rates.

=== Chronic illness ===
Even after accounting for other potential contributors like income, smoking or employment status, poor housing conditions are associated with an increased risk of chronic respiratory infection. Unsanitary conditions made more severe by aging and poorly constructed structures, exacerbate the problem. Poor heating and cooling lead to an increased risk of temperature related illnesses. Heat stroke and exhaustion are a major cause of mortality and morbidity, especially for the elderly. Conversely, exposure to cold temperatures can contribute to an increased use of health services.

=== Nutrition and obesity ===
"Food deserts", areas that lack grocery stores or markets that contain healthful foods like fruits and vegetables, are primarily found in high poverty, inner-city areas where residents lack the resources to travel. Rates of obesity and the related illnesses are much higher in these areas than in higher income communities with easy access to fresh foods. A correlation has been determined for a connection between food insecurity associated with housing cost burdens and under-nutrition. A lack of adequate play areas for children, poor lighting or sidewalk condition can also lead to a lack of physical activity which is associated with increased obesity and associated morbidities, such as type II diabetes, cancer and cardiovascular disease.

== Housing hazards ==
Most significant aspects of poor housing are linked to various adverse health effects ranked by highest number of people affected. These housing hazards are linked to many health effects like respiratory symptoms, asthma, lung cancer, depression, injury, hypothermia and death.

1. Air quality
2. Hygrothermal conditions (warmth and humidity)
3. Radon
4. Noise
5. House dust mites
6. Environmental tobacco smoke
7. Fires

== Policy responses and interventions ==
Government and community-driven policies aim to mitigate housing-related health risks by addressing affordability, safety, and environmental sustainability. These interventions include housing assistance programs that support access to stable housing, regulatory protections that establish basic standards for habitability, and initiatives that focus on energy efficiency and climate resilience.

=== Affordable housing programs and financial assistance ===
Economic barriers remain a major driver of poor housing quality. Several federal and state-level initiatives provide financial support to low-income households:

- Housing Choice Voucher Program (Section 8) - Administered by the U.S. Department of Housing and Urban Development (HUD), this program helps low-income families afford private rental housing.
- Low-Income Home Energy Assistance Program (LIHEAP) - Provides financial aid for heating and cooling expenses, reducing exposure to extreme temperatures.
- National Housing Trust Fund (HTF) - Supports the construction and preservation of affordable housing, particularly for very low-income households.

=== Housing quality regulations and tenant protections ===
Federal and state policies set minimum standards for housing safety and habitability:

- Fair Housing Act (1968) - Prohibits discrimination in housing based on race, disability, and family status, ensuring equitable access to safe housing.
- Healthy Homes Initiative (HUD) - Targets lead poisoning, mold remediation, and pest management to improve indoor air quality.
- Eviction Prevention Programs - During COVID-19, eviction moratoriums temporarily reduced housing instability, but post-pandemic eviction rates remain high.

=== Climate-resilient housing policies ===
As climate change exacerbates housing-related health risks, policies have emerged to address energy efficiency, disaster resilience, and environmental justice:

- Weatherization Assistance Program (WAP) - Funds energy-efficient home upgrades to lower heating and cooling costs.
- Green Building Standards (LEED Certification) - Encourages sustainable construction practices to reduce indoor pollution and improve air quality.

=== Community-led housing initiatives ===
Local programs and nonprofit organizations play a critical role in housing advocacy and tenant protections:

- Community Land Trusts (CLTs) - Allow low-income residents to collectively own land and maintain affordable housing.
- Right to Counsel Laws - Cities like New York and San Francisco have implemented legal aid programs for tenants facing eviction. Recent annual reports indicate that these programs enabled 84% of participating tenants in New York to remain in their homes, while 92% of assisted tenants in San Francisco successfully avoided homelessness.

=== Conclusion ===
Policies aimed at improving housing quality must address affordability, safety, environmental sustainability, and tenant protections. While federal programs provide crucial funding and legal protections, state and local policies often determine the effectiveness of interventions in reducing housing-related health disparities. In addition to structural improvements, effective interventions should address psychosocial stressors by enhancing residents' sense of safety, stability, and control. These dimensions are often overlooked in policy, yet they significantly impact mental and physical health.

== See also ==
- ARCHIVE Global
