= Cushing Dolbeare =

Cushing Niles Dolbeare (June 25, 1926 – March 17, 2005) was one of the leading experts on federal housing policy and low income housing in the United States. She designed the methodology for Out of Reach, the widely cited annual report of the National Low Income Housing Coalition (NLIHC) on the gap between housing costs and wages of low income people. She was also known for her analysis of federal housing subsidies, which document the disparity between the cost of tax-based subsidies that benefit homeowners and direct spending on housing assistance for low income households.

Dolbeare began the National Low Income Housing Coalition in 1974 when she organized the Ad Hoc Low Income Housing Coalition in response to the Nixon Administration’s moratorium on federal housing programs. She served as NLIHC’s Executive Director from 1977 to 1984 and from 1993 to 1994. She remained active with NLIHC as a researcher, policy analyst, and board member until her death.

Dolbeare was an adviser and friend to several Secretaries of Housing and Urban Development (HUD). In 1996, Jason DeParle wrote in The New York Times that she was the “dean” of the Washington Corps of housing advocates. In 2002, she was awarded the 8th Annual Heinz Award in the Human Condition.

Dolbeare worked with housing organizations past her retirement; she delivered a speech in Washington, D.C. nine days before her death. Dolbeare died of cancer on March 17, 2005 at her home.

In 2007, the National Low Income Housing Coalition created the Cushing Niles Dolbeare Media Awards, in honor of Dolbeare. The awards are presented yearly to print journalists who "do an exemplary job of illuminating the affordable housing crisis in the United States."
