= National Center for Healthy Housing =

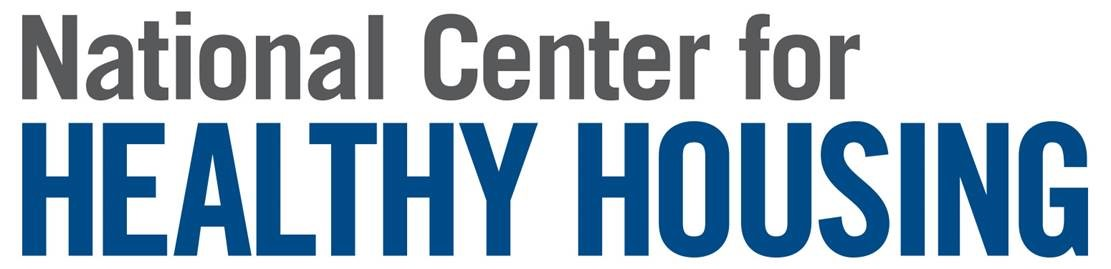
- Logo for the National Center for Healthy Housing
- Abbreviation: NCHH
- Nickname: NCHH
- Formation: 1992 (as the National Center for Lead-Safe Housing)
- Type: Nonprofit
- Legal status: 501(c)(3)
- Purpose: NCHH is dedicated to establishing healthy, green, and safe homes for families across all income levels through research, education, training, and policy efforts.
- Headquarters: Columbia, MD, United States
- Region served: All 50 states, U.S. territories
- Services: Healthy housing such as lead paint removal lead paint testing Bug removal
- Executive Director: Amanda Reddy
- Board of directors: https://nchh.org/who-we-are/staff-and-leadership/board-of-directors/
- Staff: 20
- Website: nchh.org
- Remarks: Names: -National Center for Lead-Safe Housing (1992 [founding]–2001) -National Center for Healthy Housing (since 2001)
- Formerly called: National center for lead safe housing

The National Center for Healthy Housing (NCHH) is a national nonprofit organization dedicated to creating safe and healthy housing for American families. Its research often provides a scientific basis for federal, state, and local policies and programs. NCHH trained nearly 45,000 individuals in healthy housing practices from 2005 through 2014. NCHH's advocacy efforts aim to ensure that health is considered in housing policy and that housing is valued as a determinant of health. Through partnerships, NCHH seeks to reduce health disparities in low-income communities and communities of color. Founded by Fannie Mae in 1992, it was originally known as the National Center for Lead-Safe Housing. NCHH's main office is based in downtown Columbia, Maryland.

With over 25 years of experience, NCHH conducts applied research, program evaluation, technical assistance, training, and outreach focused on reducing the health consequences of indoor exposures. NCHH's staff includes housing, health, and environmental professionals with expertise in biostatistics, epidemiology, environmental health, public health, housing policy, and industrial hygiene.

== History ==
1992-2002: Formation of the National Center for Lead-Safe Housing

The Fannie Mae Foundation created the National Center for Lead-Safe Housing (as it was known at the time) in October 1992, using a $5.2 million donation from its outgoing president, David Maxwell. At the time, the grant was the Fannie Mae Foundation’s largest-ever gift. The purpose of the gift was to create a nonprofit organization that would represent, with the Alliance for Healthy Homes (a District of Columbia-based nonprofit organization) and the Enterprise Foundation serving as parent organizations, the first national joint venture between affordable housing and environmental public health advocates.

Walter G. "Nick" Farr, a vice president of the Enterprise Foundation, was asked to lead the new nonprofit. Joining Farr as the deputy director at the fledgling organization was Dr. David Jacobs, a technical expert on lead-based paint safety. Prior to joining the National Center for Lead-Safe Housing, Dr. Jacobs had been a faculty research scientist at the Georgia Institute of Technology. The two men assembled a team of researchers, housing professionals, advocates, and others to chart the nation's path to primary prevention of childhood lead poisoning.

Over the next few years, the Department of Housing and Urban Development (HUD) challenged the center to compose a definitive source of national technical guidelines for dealing with lead-based paint, the Centers for Disease Control and Prevention (CDC) asked the center to develop robust scientific studies in order to understand sources and pathways of lead exposure, and the Environmental Protection Agency requested research to assess the hazards of lead-contaminated dust. Cushing Dolbeare, a preeminent affordable housing advocate and board member of both the new center and the Alliance for Healthy Homes, chaired a congressionally chartered task force in 1995 with a vision for making the nation’s housing stock lead-safe, demanding changes in state and local laws, regulations, and ordinances.

In 2001, the center was one of the first to recognize publicly that homes with lead paint problems typically posed several other health threats as well; they argued that addressing these hazards separately was both ineffective and inefficient.

Recognizing the need and their capability to address more home hazards than lead-based paint, the board of directors opted to change the organization’s name from the National Center for Lead-Safe Housing to the National Center for Healthy Housing (NCHH) in 2001. The larger scale inferred by the change of the organization’s name allowed NCHH to expand the scope of its mission significantly; it would now focus not only on lead, still a major priority, but also other housing-related health hazards and causes, such as asthma, mold, and integrated pest management.

Nick Farr retired from the organization in 2001 but remained in touch with his friends and colleagues at NCHH until his passing on May 27, 2014.

2002-2014: Rebecca Morley Becomes NCHH's Second Executive Director; Formation of Healthy Housing Solutions

In July 2002, Nick Farr's replacement as executive director came in the form of Rebecca Morley, MSPP, who had worked previously as a senior associate at ICF Consulting in Washington, DC. At ICF, Ms. Morley had advised clients, including federal agencies, on lead poisoning prevention. Under Ms. Morley’s stewardship, the center continued to grow and flourish.

NCHH established a subsidiary for-profit organization in September 2003. Christened Healthy Housing Solutions, the subsidiary was created to assist governmental and nongovernmental clients in developing, managing, and evaluating projects supporting the creation of healthier homes for all Americans. The subsidiary officially began operations on November 14, 2003, with Jackson Anderson serving as its president, and would pursue government grants for which NCHH was ineligible.

The EPA promulgated the Renovation, Repair, and Training (RRP) Rule in April 2008. The RRP Rule went into effect on April 22, 2010; one of its requirements was that any contractor engaged to perform home renovations for money must complete an eight-hour training course in lead-safe work practices and pass an exam. As lead-safety experts who had often offered advice on the topic to the EPA over the years, NCHH began a national training initiative in August 2009 with the goal of ensuring that lead safety courses would be available to contractors nearly everywhere that there was a demand for them. NCHH assembled a network of over one hundred trainers across the country to teach RRP compliance, ultimately training approximately 27,500 contractors across forty states, plus the U.S. territory of Guam. While the RRP Rule is still in effect, NCHH did not seek to renew its training certification with the EPA when it expired in 2013 and no longer offers RRP certification courses.

In January 2010, NCHH and the Alliance for Healthy Homes, a national nonprofit with a similar focus, announced a merger. As a result of the merger, NCHH assumed control of the Alliance for Healthy Homes' assets and staff.

Executive Director Rebecca Morley announced her resignation from NCHH in October 2014, effective December 2. NCHH's board asked deputy director Jonathan Wilson to serve as acting director until Morley's permanent replacement was selected.

2015-2017: Nancy Eldridge Becomes NCHH's Third Executive Director; Formation of the Well-Home Network

Nancy Rockett Eldridge was announced as NCHH's third executive director on May 28, 2015. Since 1999, Eldridge had served as CEO for Cathedral Square, a Burlington, VT-based nonprofit specializing in healthy home environments for older adults. Under her leadership, Cathedral Square increased the number of affordable housing communities to 28. Ms. Eldridge's service as NCHH's executive director began on August 5, 2015. Eldridge's interest in creating healthy housing for older adults resulted in the formation of the Well-Home Network.

2017-Forward: Amanda Reddy Becomes NCHH's Fourth Executive Director

Amanda Reddy was announced as NCHH's fourth executive director on May 17, 2017. Reddy originally joined NCHH's subsidiary, Healthy Housing Solutions, in 2012 but moved from that organization over to NCHH the following year.

== Healthy Housing Solutions ==
In September 2003, NCHH’s board of directors voted to establish a wholly owned, for-profit subsidiary "Solutions". The subsidiary was created to pursue federal small business set-aside contracts for which NCHH, as a 501(c)(3) nonprofit organization, would be ineligible. Therefore, Solutions’ successful efforts to secure these federal contracts and other state and local agency contracts would directly benefit NCHH and support its mission. Solutions officially began operations on November 14, 2003, with Jackson Anderson Jr., then a senior staff member at NCHH, named as its president/CEO. As the sole shareholder, NCHH appoints Solutions' six-member board of directors.

Solutions provide public agencies and private sector organizations with professional services related to residential environmental health and safety (including applied field research and evaluation), program evaluation and analysis, policy and regulatory support the creation of technical guidance documents and white papers, development, and management of technical training programs, the review and analysis of peer review literature and scientific documents, convening technical advisory review panels, logistical and technical support for conferences and seminars, and strategic planning services. Many of Solutions’ current and past projects address children’s health concerns, initiatives, and issues, including primary prevention approaches and programs.

Since its founding by NCHH, Solutions has performed a variety of assignments, primarily under four federal multiyear task order-type indefinite delivery/indefinite quantity (IDIQ) contracts in which multiple and varied projects have been awarded. Three of these contracts have been with the U.S. Department of Housing and Urban Development’s Office of Lead Hazard Control and Healthy Homes (HUD OLHCHH), and one contract has been with the U.S. Centers for Disease Control and Prevention’s Lead Poisoning Prevention and Healthy Homes Office.
