= Executive Order 14149 =

"Ending Federal Censorship"

- "Restoring Freedom of Speech and Ending Federal Censorship"
- Front page of Executive Order 14149
- Type: Executive order
- Number: 14149
- President: Donald Trump
- Signed: January 20, 2025

Federal Register details
- Federal Register document number: 2025-01902
- Publication date: January 28, 2025

Executive Order 14149, titled "Restoring Freedom of Speech and Ending Federal Censorship", is an executive order signed by Donald Trump, the 47th president of the United States, on January 20, 2025, the day of his second inauguration. It posits that the Federal Government infringed on the constitutionally protected speech rights of American citizens.

== Background ==
The order closely aligns with a video outlining a “Free Speech Policy Initiative” released by the Trump campaign in 2022, in which then-candidate Trump stated that he will sign an Executive Order banning “any federal department…from colluding with any organization, business, or person, to censor, limit, categorize, or impede the lawful speech of American citizens."

In June 2024, the U.S. Supreme Court ruled in Murthy v. Missouri that the federal government is allowed to communicate with social media companies about content moderation policies and the removal of misinformation on social media sites.

EO 14149 was signed with 25 other executive orders on the first day of Trump's second presidency.

== Provisions and effects ==
EO 14149 bars the use of taxpayer resources to carry out what it claims has been censorship, which may refer to the efforts of social media platforms and independent researchers to mitigate or track misinformation.

The order also tells the attorney general to investigate the federal government's activities over the past four years in the context of free speech, and to seek remedial actions, although it is vague on what these actions may be.

== Implementation ==
Two days after the EO, the chairman of the Federal Communications Commission (FCC) reopened a previously dismissed proceeding by Donald Trump as a private citizen against CBS related to a 2024 interview between Kamala Harris and 60 Minutes, creating an official docket on the CBS investigation on February 5, 2025.

== Reactions ==
EO 14149 has received scrutiny from disinformation experts, who "warned the move will only further the spread of false information on social media". Nina Jankowicz said that this is an assault on reality, emboldening foreign entities and disinformation profiteers. The order was to fulfill a pledge to Trump supporters per USA Today. The Washington Post wrote the Order was a signal that Trump wants to "continue to fight against online content moderation". The EO has been quoted as being part of a fight over the power of language.

== See also ==
- Executive Order 14168, declaring that there were only two genders
- List of executive orders in the second presidency of Donald Trump
- Murthy v. Missouri (2024)
- Targeting of political opponents and civil society under the second Trump administration
