= National Low Income Housing Coalition =

United States nonprofit organization

- Formation: 1974; 52 years ago
- Founded: 1974
- Headquarters: Washington, D.C.
- Key people: Renee Willis, President & CEO; Diane Yental, immediate past President & CEO; Cushing Dolbeare, Founder
- Website: nlihc.org

The National Low Income Housing Coalition (NLIHC) is a non-profit organization dedicated to ending America's affordable housing crisis. It aims to expand and preserve housing for people with extremely low incomes. NLIHC provides current information and data on affordable housing, and formulates policy and increases awareness on housing needs and strategies.

== History ==
NLIHC was founded in 1974 by Cushing Dolbeare, a housing policy analyst and consultant. Initially named the Ad Hoc Low Income Housing Coalition and incorporated as the National Low Income Housing Coalition five years later, Dolbeare created the organization in response to Nixon's 1973 moratorium on federal housing subsidies. To Dolbeare, the lack of affordable housing was for poor people a chronic problem with few available solutions. In the organization's first years, it operated out of Dolbeare's Capitol Hill home. Similar interest groups at the time include the National Tenants Organization.

Since the early years of the 2000s, NLIHC was active in leading housing advocates in the creation of a federally funded housing trust fund. The National Housing Trust Fund was passed as part of the Housing and Economic Recovery Act of 2008. In 2016, the trust fund started providing grants to states to increase the supply of rental housing for extremely low income households. NLIHC continues to advocate for increased financial support to the National Housing Trust Fund.

=== Leadership ===
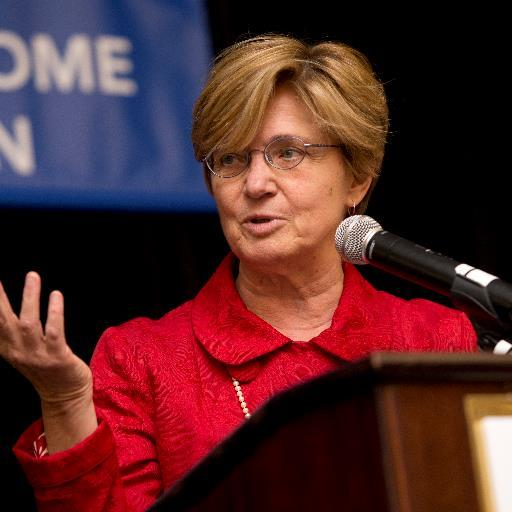
Sheila Crowley, former coalition president (photo 2016)

Dolbeare headed the organization from 1977 to 1984 and 1993 to 1994. In 2024, NLIHC commemorated its 50 years of operations. In 2016, Diane Yentel, who worked as an NLIHC analyst in her first Washington, D.C., job, became president of the organization. Yentel succeeded Sheila Crowley, who retired after leading the organization for more than 17 years. In October 2024, Yentel announced she would be leaving her role in NLIHC, joining the National Council of Nonprofits as president and CEO. Renee M. Willis replaced her as president and CEO of NLIHC in May 2025.

== Activities ==
NLIHC has developed a national database on subsidized and federally assisted housing. HUD provides data on the number of rental assistance and insurance program it administers, which NLIHC combines with data on properties supported by the Department of Agriculture or low income housing tax credits. Around the 1980s, the coalition was affiliated with the Low Income Housing Information Service.

The organization's annual publication, Out of Reach, developed a formula called the "housing wage" that spotlights the gap between income and housing costs. The widely cited report identifies the number of hours someone earning minimum wage would have to work to afford a two bedroom house in every jurisdiction in the country.

In March 2026, NLIHC found that there are only 35 affordable homes for every 100 extremely low-income renters in the United States. The report, titled "The Gap," tracks affordable rental unit shortages in all 50 U.S. states and the District of Columbia.

== See also ==
- Housing insecurity in the United States
