= Johnson Amendment =

U.S. tax code rule regarding non-profit organizations

The Johnson Amendment is a provision in the U.S. tax code, since 1954, that prohibits all 501(c)(3) non-profit organizations from endorsing or opposing political candidates. Section 501(c)(3) organizations are the most common type of nonprofit organization in the United States, ranging from charitable foundations to universities and churches. The amendment is named for then-Senator Lyndon B. Johnson of Texas, who introduced it in a preliminary draft of the law in July 1954.

Widespread violations of the Johnson Amendment have been observed by religious institutions. A 2026 PNAS study found that nearly 15% of predominantly evangelical churches engaged in direct political advocacy and endorsements during the three months surrounding the 2020 and 2024 elections.

In the early 21st century, some politicians, including President Donald Trump, have sought to repeal the provision, arguing that it restricts the free speech rights of churches and other religious groups. These efforts have been criticized because churches have fewer reporting requirements than other non-profit organizations, and because it would effectively make political contributions tax-deductible. On May 4, 2017, Trump signed an executive order "to defend the freedom of religion and speech" for the purpose of easing the Johnson Amendment's restrictions.

== Provisions ==
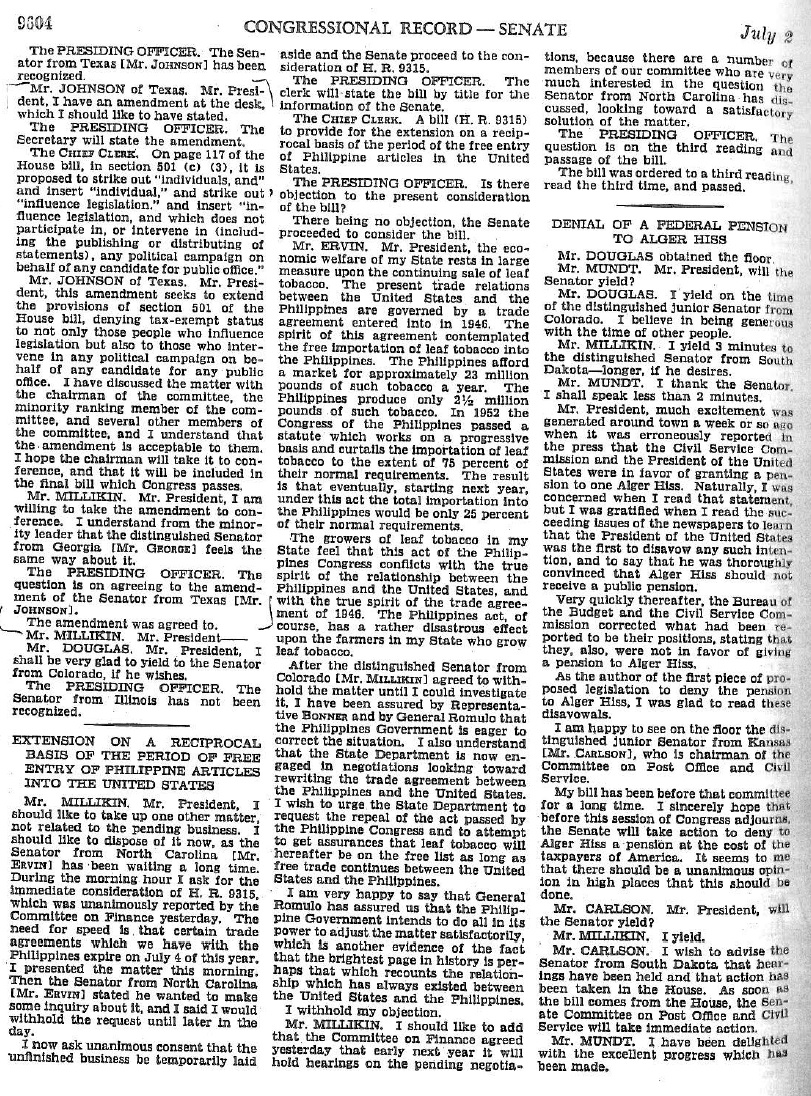
Page from the Congressional Record containing a transcript of the passage of the amendment

Paragraph (3) of subsection (c) within section 501 of Title 26 (Internal Revenue Code) of the U.S. Code (U.S.C.) describes organizations which may be exempt from U.S. Federal income tax. 501(c)(3) is written as follows, with the Johnson Amendment in bold letters:

(3) Corporations, and any community chest, fund, or foundation, organized and operated exclusively for religious, charitable, scientific, testing for public safety, literary, or educational purposes, or to foster national or international amateur sports competition (but only if no part of its activities involve the provision of athletic facilities or equipment), or for the prevention of cruelty to children or animals, no part of the net earnings of which inures to the benefit of any private shareholder or individual, no substantial part of the activities of which is carrying on propaganda, or otherwise attempting, to influence legislation (except as otherwise provided in subsection (h)), and which does not participate in, or intervene in (including the publishing or distributing of statements), any political campaign on behalf of (or in opposition to) any candidate for public office.[bolding added]

The amendment affects nonprofit organizations with 501(c)(3) tax exemptions, which are subject to absolute prohibitions on engaging in political activities and risk loss of tax-exempt status if violated. Specifically, they are prohibited from conducting political campaign activities to intervene in elections to public office. The Johnson Amendment applies to any 501(c)(3) organization, not just religious 501(c)(3) organizations.

The benefit of 501(c)(3) status is that, in addition to the organization itself being exempt from taxes, donors who itemize may also take a tax deduction for their contributions to the organization.

According to the Internal Revenue Service, contributions to political campaign funds, or public statements of position in favor of or in opposition to any candidate for public office, are disallowed. However, certain voter education activities (including presenting public forums and publishing voter education guides), voter registration, and get-out-the-vote drives, if conducted in a non-partisan manner, are not prohibited.

== History ==
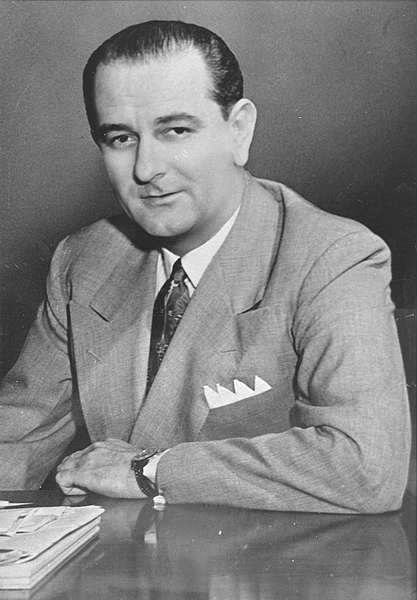
Lyndon B. Johnson during his tenure as Senator from Texas and before becoming Vice President

The amendment was to a bill in the 83rd Congress, H.R. 8300, which was enacted into law as the Internal Revenue Code of 1954. The amendment was proposed by Senator Lyndon B. Johnson of Texas on July 2, 1954. The amendment was agreed to without any discussion or debate and was included in Internal Revenue Code of 1954 (Aug. 16, 1954, ch. 736). The provision was considered uncontroversial at the time and continued to be included when the 1954 Code was renamed as the Internal Revenue Code of 1986 during the Ronald Reagan administration.

== Repeal efforts ==
In the 2010s, the Alliance Defending Freedom (ADF) made attempts to challenge the Johnson Amendment through the Pulpit Freedom Initiative, which urges Protestant ministers to violate the statute in protest. The ADF contends that the amendment violates First Amendment rights.

During his 2016 presidential campaign, Donald Trump called for the repeal of the amendment. On February 2, 2017, newly-elected President Trump vowed at the National Prayer Breakfast to "totally destroy" the Johnson Amendment, White House Press Secretary Sean Spicer announced to the press that Trump "committed to get rid of the Johnson Amendment ... allowing our representatives of faith to speak freely and without retribution", and Republican lawmakers introduced legislation that would allow all 501(c)(3) organizations to support political candidates, as long as any associated spending was minimal.

On May 4, 2017, Trump signed the "Presidential Executive Order Promoting Free Speech and Religious Liberty." The executive order does not repeal the Johnson Amendment, nor does it allow ministers to endorse from the pulpit, but it does halt the enforcement of its consequences by directing the Department of Treasury that "churches should not be found guilty of implied endorsements where secular organizations would not be." Douglas Laycock, a leading law professor in the areas of religious liberty, spoke to The Washington Post, saying that he was not aware of any cases where such implied endorsements have caused problems in the past.

Republican Representative Walter B. Jones Jr. was the principal congressional advocate for repealing the speech restriction altogether and had support from the Family Research Council in modifying religious speech language in the Kevin Brady-sponsored tax re-write legislation known as the Tax Cuts and Jobs Act of 2017. However, the final version of the legislation passed in December 2017 did not include the House repeal of the Johnson Amendment, because the Senate parliamentarian ruled that it violated the Byrd Rule for reconciliation legislation.

In a July 7, 2025, court filing, the IRS carved out a significant new exception to the Johnson Amendment, saying churches are allowed to endorse political candidates in their "usual channels of communication" with no tax-related consequences.

=== Criticism ===
Efforts to repeal the Johnson Amendment have been criticized for a number of reasons. One concern is that political campaign contributions funneled through 501(c)(3) organizations would be tax-deductible for donors and that such contributions would not be disclosed since churches are exempt from reporting requirements required of other 501(c)(3) organizations. Under that critique, repeal would have the potential of creating a mechanism where political contributions could be made without regard to other campaign financing laws. This concern was validated by Congressional testimony from Thomas Barthold, Chief of Staff of Congress' nonpartisan Joint Committee on Taxation, saying of a repeal provision later removed from the tax bill passed in late 2017 "it's a diversion of some of the substantial growth in political contributions into a deductible form that is not deductible today."

Other concerns include the potential damage to public trust in nonprofit and religious organizations if they were to begin endorsing candidates. Polls have shown that majorities of both the general public and of clergy oppose churches endorsing political candidates. The National Council of Nonprofits, a network of more than 25,000 nonprofit organizations, released a statement opposing the proposed repeal legislation. Independent Sector, a coalition of nonprofits, foundations, and corporations has also stated their opposition to the proposal to repeal the Johnson Amendment. Numerous efforts to preserve the protections of the Johnson Amendment include a letter in support of nonprofit nonpartisanship signed by more than 5,500 organizations, a Faith Voices letter signed by more than 4,300 religious leaders, a letter that more than 100 denominations and major religious organizations signed, and a letter from the National Association of State Charity Officials.

There have also been concerns from clergy and lay Christians about the potential that a total repeal would cause churches to transform into partisan super PACs.

The Catholic Church does not allow church funds to be spent on behalf of political candidates nor endorsements from the pulpit regardless of the legal permissibility. In a 2017 interview, Archbishop William E. Lori, who chaired the conference's religious liberty division, said of the amendment, "As a general rule, it is not a good idea for churches to engage in partisan politics. I believe that, generally, that proves to be a great distraction from our central task and mission, which is to preach the Gospel. Furthermore, I think it would have a tendency to unnecessarily divide our congregations." He went on to say that people should be wary of any attempt to change the Johnson Amendment.

== See also ==
- 501(c) organization – Type of tax-exempt nonprofit organization in the United States
- Charitable contribution deductions in the United States
- Charitable organization – Nonprofit organization with charitable purpose
- Internal Revenue Code – United States federal tax code
- Separation of church and state in the United States – Political principle in the United States
