= National Council of Nonprofits =

United States nonprofit organization

- Formation: 1990; 36 years ago
- Founded: 1990
- Headquarters: Washington, D.C.
- Key people: Diane Yentel, President and CEO; Sabeen Perwaiz, Board Chair
- Revenue: $2,428,313
- Expenses: $3,840,000
- Website: councilofnonprofits.org

The National Council of Nonprofits (NCN) is the largest nonprofit network in the United States, with 25,000 nonprofit members and 52 state nonprofit network subsidiaries. Founded in 1990 and based in Washington, D.C., NCN engages in public policy advocacy and conducts professional development for nonprofit members, providing nonprofits with research and assets to assist their operations.

NCN's president and CEO is Diane Yentel.

== History ==
The National Council of Nonprofits was established in 1990 to advance the role of charitable nonprofit organization across North America. Initially, NCN aimed to connect nonprofits through a national platform focused on advocacy and resource sharing. Over time, NCN expanded its partnerships to include state associations to address region-specific nonprofit challenges, offering a more localized approach to its support and advocacy efforts. Through these expansions, NCN created a federated structure to coordinate national objectives with state-level initiatives, attempting to balance centralized support with local responsiveness.

The organization has a four-star rating on Charity Navigator.

=== Leadership ===
Tim Delaney was the acting CEO of NCN and had served in the role for 16 years. In January 2025, former National Low Income Housing Coalition CEO and public sector veteran Diane Yentel took Delaney's place as president and CEO of NCN.

== Activities ==
The National Council of Nonprofits has an integrated three-part approach to its work, aiming to "champion, connect, inform." It has reported a newsletter subscriber base of 100,000 recipients and claimed a significant role in shaping nonprofits' access to PPP loans during the COVID-19 pandemic.

NCN offers various professional development programs, including training and webinars focused on governance, financial management, closure, and compliance. It hosts multiple webinars each year, increasing its revenue through webinar sponsorship fees of up to $10,000. The Federal Reserve and FEMA have sought its support in the past. NCN's analysis and work has been cited in various prominent publications. Its programs are aimed at improving leadership and operational capacity within its partnered organizations. NCN also reports on emerging issues that affect the nonprofit sector.

In 2025, NCN launched the campaign "Nonprofits Get It Done," highlighting the impact of local nonprofits and introducing a toolkit for organizations to share their stories.

In June 2025, Yentel testified before the congressional Subcommittee on Delivering on Government Efficiency to defend the nonprofit sector's reputation. She criticized the Trump administration for "arbitrary and unlawful cuts of congressionally-approved spending and reckless federal funding freezes," calling the proposed budget cuts a "potential five-alarm fire for nonprofit organizations and the people and communities they serve.”
