= Embedded journalism =

Practice of attaching journalists to military units

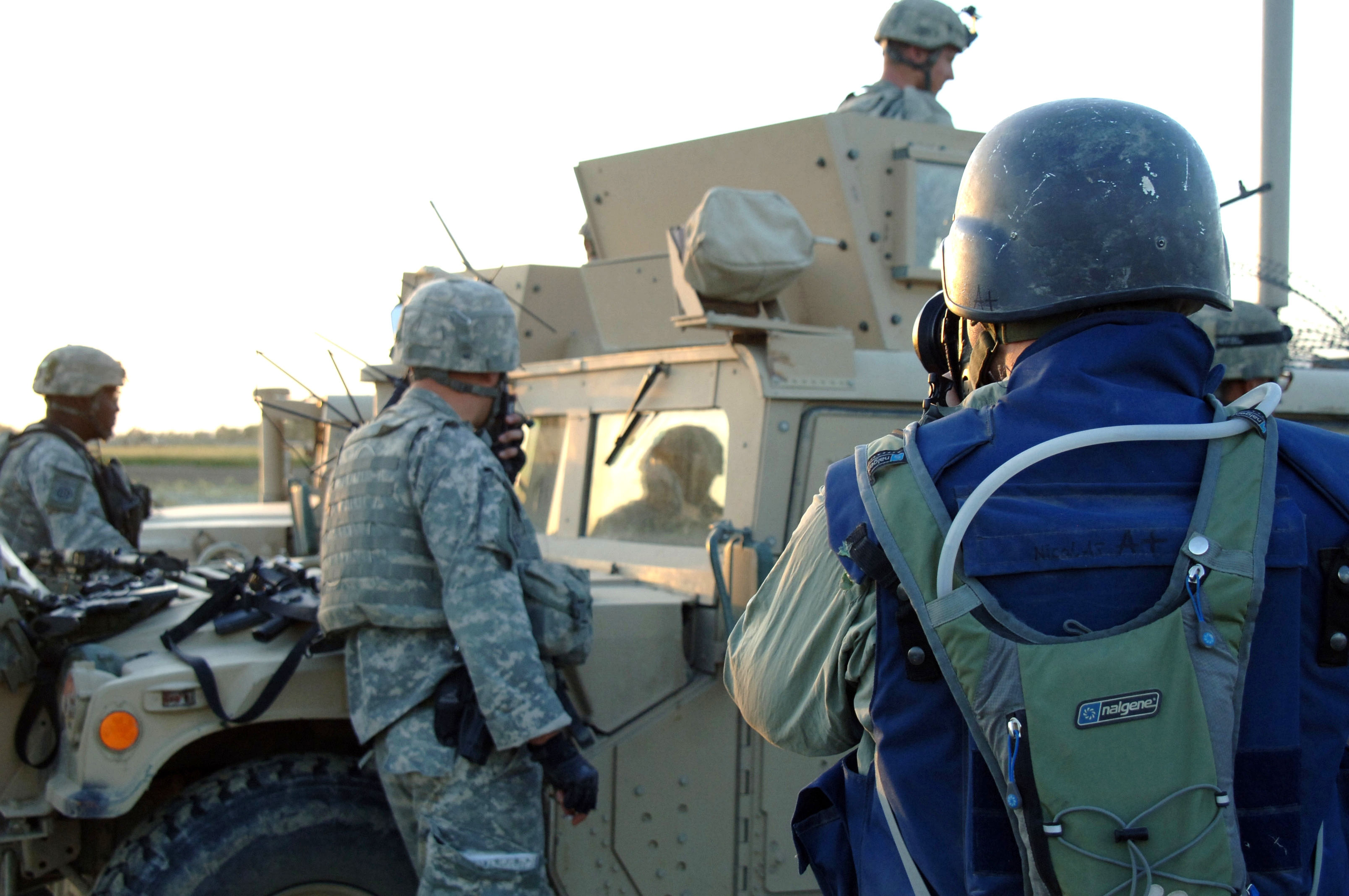
An embedded civilian journalist taking photographs of US soldiers in Pana, Afghanistan.

Embedded journalism is the practice of attaching war correspondents to military units involved in armed conflicts. While the term could be applied to many historical interactions between journalists and military personnel, it first came to be used in the media coverage of the 2003 invasion of Iraq. The United States military responded to pressure from the country's news media who were disappointed by the level of access granted during the 1991 Gulf War and the 2001 U.S. invasion of Afghanistan.

The practice has been criticized as being part of a propaganda campaign whereby embedded journalists accompanied the invading forces as cheerleaders and media relations representatives.

Journalists who instead opted to cover the invasion of Iraq on the battlefield while unattached to any military force came to be called "unilaterals." Journalists chose to act as unilaterals to avoid the restrictions imposed on them by the military, and sometimes embed restrictions, which required embeds to stay with assigned units. Journalists sometimes opted to act as unilaterals out of concern that being under the constant protection of troops in the US-led coalition on the battlefield would bias their judgement in favor of coalition forces. The military often regarded unilateral journalists as sources of trouble on the battlefield and refuse to talk to them or not recognize unilateral journalists as "official" media.

== World War 2 ==
There are many documented examples of embedded journalists during World War 2. Many journalists had an amicable relationship with the military and some reporters were trained by different branches. The Allied military set up press camps and allowed mostly unfettered access across frontlines. Journalists were also targeted by the Nazis who had extreme censorship about war coverage.

=== Ernie Pyle and Other Notable Reporters ===
One of the most popular embedded journalists during the war was Ernie Pyle. As a reporter he found himself in various war theaters including the Battle of Britain and the Normandy Landings. He was known for explicitly embedding himself into the general infantry and reporting from the perspectives of the everyday soldier. Up until his death on the Japanese island of Ie Shima, Pyle would wear the same military fatigues, boots and helmet as the rest of the infantrymen he embedded himself with.

Walter Cronkite, the longtime CBS anchor who started his career embedded with the allied military, was one of the members of the group. Besides being one of the only correspondents to return from the USS Texas during Operation Torch. Besides the many theaters he saw he was also part of "the Writing 69th," a group of 8 journalists trained to fly aboard bomber planes with the eighth Air Force. The group were trained to spot enemy aircraft and shoot weapons although they were forbidden to do so. As a member he flew aboard a B-17 Bomber on route to provide allied support to the Normandy landings but was unable to witness it due to bad weather.

Other members of the Writing 69th include Andy Rooney, Robert Post, Homer Bigart, Paul Manning, Gladwin Hill, Denton Scott, & William Wade.

Photojournalist Robert Capa also found himself embedded with the US army while covering the war. Noted by some to be one of the best combat photographers in history, he produced many photos from the frontlines including a group of 11 photos known as "the Magnificent Eleven" during the Normandy Landings. He also covered Allied victories in North Africa and the captures of Leipzig, Nuremberg, and Berlin.

== Vietnam War ==
The Vietnam war was covered by hundreds of journalists due to unprecedented access provided by the military. The U.S. Military Assistance Command, Vietnam (MACV) allowed journalists to travel freely throughout the different war theaters and report combat firsthand. As a result, much of the war was quickly reported and widely unfiltered by the military. Press coverage directly challenged political narratives and highlighted complex issues in fighting abroad.

Some claim that news coverage, which was often critical of both the war and the military, strained relationships between the press and military. In the post-Vietnam era, the military became more wary of war reporting since it learned that a war must be broadly supported by the public.

Some notable reporters from the time include Morley Safer, Dickey Chapelle, David Halberstam, Larry Burrows, John Sack, Michael Herr.

== 2003 invasion of Iraq ==
At the start of the war in March 2003, as many as 775 reporters and photographers were traveling as embedded journalists. These reporters signed contracts with the military promising not to report information that could compromise unit position, future missions, classified weapons, and information they might find. Joint training for war correspondents started in November 2002 in advance of start of the war. When asked why the military decided to embed journalists with the troops, Lt. Col. Rick Long of the U.S. Marine Corps replied, "Frankly, our job is to win the war. Part of that is information warfare. So we are going to attempt to dominate the information environment."

== Military control ==
The first journalist to run afoul of U.S. military rules in Iraq was freelancer Philip Smucker, travelling on assignment for The Christian Science Monitor with the 1st Marine Division. Smucker was not officially embedded, but all reporters in the theater of war were deemed subject to Pentagon oversight. On March 26, 2003, during an interview with CNN, Smucker disclosed the location of a Marine unit, as he'd also done during an interview with NPR. He was thereafter expelled.

Four days later, Fox News Channel correspondent Geraldo Rivera similarly broadcast details from Iraq of the position and plans of U.S. troops. "Let me draw a few lines here for you," he said, making on-camera marks in the sand. "First, I want to make some emphasis here that these hash marks here, this is us. We own that territory. It's 40%, maybe even a little more than that." At another point, complained a CENTCOM spokesman, Rivera "actually revealed the time of an attack prior to its occurrence." Although Rivera—like Philip Smucker—was not officially embedded, he was swiftly escorted back to Kuwait. A week later, Rivera apologized. "I'm sorry that it happened," he said on Fox News Channel, "and I assure you that it was inadvertent. Nobody was hurt by what I said. No mission was compromised." However, a network review, he admitted, "showed that I did indeed break one of the rules related to embedment."

In December 2005 the U.S. Coalition Forces Land Component Command in Kuwait pulled the credentials of two embedded journalists on a two-week assignment for the Virginian-Pilot newspaper in Norfolk, Virginia, claiming they violated a prohibition against photographing damaged vehicles.

== Criticism ==
We were a propaganda arm of our governments. At the start the censors enforced that, but by the end we were our own censors. We were cheerleaders.

— Charles Lynch

The ethics of embedded journalism are considered controversial. The practice has been criticized as being part of a propaganda campaign and an effort to keep reporters away from civilian populations and sympathetic to invading forces; for example by the documentary films War Made Easy: How Presidents & Pundits Keep Spinning Us to Death and The War You Don't See.

Embed critics objected that the level of military oversight was too strict and that embedded journalists would make reports that were too sympathetic to the American side of the war, leading to use of the alternate term "inbedded journalist" or "inbeds". "Those correspondents who drive around in tanks and armored personnel carriers," said journalist Gay Talese in an interview, "who are spoon-fed what the military gives them and they become mascots for the military, these journalists. I wouldn't have journalists embedded if I had any power!... There are stories you can do that aren't done. I've said that many times."

On 14 June 2014, The New York Times published an opinion piece critical of embedded journalism during both the U.S. military occupation of Iraq and the war in Afghanistan. It was written by PVT Chelsea Manning, the former U.S. Army intelligence analyst known for leaking the largest set of classified documents in American history. At no point during her 2009–10 deployment in Iraq, Manning wrote, were there more than a dozen American journalists covering military operations—in a country of 31 million people and 117,000 U.S. troops. Manning charged that vetting of reporters by military public affairs officials was used "to screen out those judged likely to produce critical coverage," and that once embedded, journalists tended "to avoid controversial reporting that could raise red flags" out of fear having their access terminated. "A result," wrote Manning, "is that the American public's access to the facts is gutted, which leaves them with no way to evaluate the conduct of American officials." Manning noted, "This program of limiting press access was challenged in court in 2013 by a freelance reporter, Wayne Anderson, who claimed to have followed his agreement but to have been terminated after publishing adverse reports about the conflict in Afghanistan. The ruling on his case upheld the military's position that there was no constitutionally protected right to be an embedded journalist."

Gina Cavallaro, a reporter for the Army Times, said, "They're [the journalists] relying more on the military to get them where they want to go, and as a result, the military is getting smarter about getting its own story told." But, she added, "I don't necessarily consider that a bad thing."

== Dangers ==
Many journalists who cover wars die as a result of them. Of the aforementioned, there were many embedded journalists who were either seriously wounded or died during their coverage. During both the Iraq War and War in Afghanistan, improvised explosive devices (IEDs) were used extensively against U.S.-led Coalition forces, and accounted for the majority of Coalition casualties. Journalists travelling with ground forces were at the same risk. On January 29, 2006, while embedded with the U.S. Army's 4th Infantry Division, ABC's World News Tonight co-anchor Bob Woodruff and cameraman Doug Vogt were, together with an Iraqi soldier, seriously injured when their convoy was ambushed near Taji, Iraq, and an IED detonated beneath them. At the time of the attack, Woodruff and Vogt were exposed, standing in the back hatch of their Iraqi mechanized vehicle taping a video log of the patrol.

== See also ==
- Editorial independence
- Freedom of the press
- War correspondent
- Enemy Image, a documentary about The Pentagon's approach to news coverage of war
- Generation Kill, a book about the experiences of an embedded journalist
- Weapons of Mass Deception, a documentary by former network journalist, Danny Schechter. Featuring appearances by many well known journalists including Robert Young Pelton (who actually filmed the embed process and how the media worked).
