= Junk science =

Scientific data considered to be spurious or fraudulent

Junk science is spurious or fraudulent scientific data, research, or analysis. The concept is often invoked in political and legal contexts where facts and scientific results have a great amount of weight in making a determination. It usually conveys a pejorative connotation that the research has been untowardly driven by political, ideological, financial, or otherwise unscientific motives.

The concept was popularized in the 1990s in relation to expert testimony in civil litigation. More recently, invoking the concept has been a tactic to criticize research on the harmful environmental or public health effects of corporate activities, and occasionally in response to such criticism.

In some contexts, junk science is counterposed to the "sound science" or "solid science" that favors one's own point of view. Junk science has been criticized for undermining public trust in real science. Junk science is not the same as pseudoscience.

== Definition ==
Junk science has been defined as:

- "science done to establish a preconceived notion—not to test the notion, which is what proper science tries to do, but to establish it regardless of whether or not it would hold up to real testing."
- "opinion posing as empirical evidence, or through evidence of questionable warrant, based on inadequate scientific methodology."
- "methodologically sloppy research conducted to advance some extrascientific agenda or to prevail in litigation."

== Motivations ==
Junk science happens for different reasons: researchers believing that their ideas are correct before proper analysis (a sort of scientific self-delusion or drinking the Kool-Aid), researchers biased with their study designs, and/or a "plain old lack of ethics". Being overly attached to one's own ideas can cause research to veer from ordinary junk science (e.g., designing an experiment that is expected to produce the desired results) into scientific fraud (e.g., lying about the results) and pseudoscience (e.g., claiming that the unfavorable results actually proved the idea correct).

Junk science can occur when the perpetrator has something to gain from arriving at the desired conclusion. It can often happen in the testimony of expert witnesses in legal proceedings, and especially in the self-serving advertising of products and services. These situations may encourage researchers to make sweeping or overstated claims based on limited evidence.

== History ==
The phrase junk science appears to have been in use prior to 1985. A 1985 United States Department of Justice report by the Tort Policy Working Group noted:

The use of such invalid scientific evidence (commonly referred to as 'junk science') has resulted in findings of causation which simply cannot be justified or understood from the standpoint of the current state of credible scientific or medical knowledge.

In 1989, the climate scientist Jerry Mahlman (Director of the Geophysical Fluid Dynamics Laboratory) characterized the theory that global warming was due to solar variation (presented in Scientific Perspectives on the Greenhouse Problem by Frederick Seitz et al.) as "noisy junk science."

Peter W. Huber popularized the term with respect to litigation in his 1991 book Galileo's Revenge: Junk Science in the Courtroom. The book has been cited in over 100 legal textbooks and references; as a consequence, some sources cite Huber as the first to coin the term. By 1997, the term had entered the legal lexicon as seen in an opinion by Supreme Court of the United States Justice John Paul Stevens:

An example of 'junk science' that should be excluded under the Daubert standard as too unreliable would be the testimony of a phrenologist who would purport to prove a defendant's future dangerousness based on the contours of the defendant's skull.

Lower courts have subsequently set guidelines for identifying junk science, such as the 2005 opinion of United States Court of Appeals for the Seventh Circuit Judge Frank H. Easterbrook:

Positive reports about magnetic water treatment are not replicable; this plus the lack of a physical explanation for any effects are hallmarks of junk science.

As the subtitle of Huber's book, Junk Science in the Courtroom, suggests, his emphasis was on the use or misuse of expert testimony in civil litigation. One prominent example cited in the book was litigation over casual contact in the spread of AIDS. A California school district sought to prevent a young boy with AIDS, Ryan Thomas, from attending kindergarten. The school district produced an expert witness, Steven Armentrout, who testified that a possibility existed that AIDS could be transmitted to schoolmates through yet undiscovered "vectors". However, five experts testified on behalf of Thomas that AIDS is not transmitted through casual contact, and the court affirmed the "solid science" (as Huber called it) and rejected Armentrout's argument.

In 1999, Paul Ehrlich and others advocated public policies to improve the dissemination of valid environmental scientific knowledge and discourage junk science:

The Intergovernmental Panel on Climate Change reports offer an antidote to junk science by articulating the current consensus on the prospects for climate change, by outlining the extent of the uncertainties, and by describing the potential benefits and costs of policies to address climate change.

In a 2003 study about changes in environmental activism regarding the Crown of the Continent Ecosystem, Pedynowski noted that junk science can undermine the credibility of science over a much broader scale because misrepresentation by special interests casts doubt on more defensible claims and undermines the credibility of all research.

In his 2006 book Junk Science, Dan Agin emphasized two main causes of junk science: fraud, and ignorance. In the first case, Agin discussed falsified results in the development of organic transistors:

As far as understanding junk science is concerned, the important aspect is that both Bell Laboratories and the international physics community were fooled until someone noticed that noise records published by Jan Hendrik Schön in several papers were identical—which means physically impossible.

In the second case, he cites an example that demonstrates ignorance of statistical principles in the lay press:

Since no such proof is possible [that genetically modified food is harmless], the article in The New York Times was what is called a "bad rap" against the U.S. Department of Agriculture—a bad rap based on a junk-science belief that it's possible to prove a null hypothesis.

Agin asks the reader to step back from the rhetoric, as "how things are labeled does not make a science junk science." In its place, he offers that junk science is ultimately motivated by the desire to hide undesirable truths from the public.

The rise of open-access (free to read) journals has resulted in economic pressure on academic publishers to publish junk science. Even when the journal is peer-reviewed, the authors, rather than the readers, become the customer and the source of funding for the journal, so the publisher is incentivized to publish as many papers as possible, including those that are methodologically unsound.

== Misuse in public relations ==
John Stauber and Sheldon Rampton of PR Watch say the concept of junk science has come to be invoked in attempts to dismiss scientific findings that stand in the way of short-term corporate profits. In their book Trust Us, We're Experts (2001), they write that industries have launched multimillion-dollar campaigns to position certain theories as junk science in the popular mind, often failing to employ the scientific method themselves. For example, the tobacco industry has described research demonstrating the harmful effects of smoking and second-hand smoke as junk science, through the vehicle of various astroturf groups.

Theories more favorable to corporate activities are portrayed in words as "sound science". Past examples where "sound science" was used include the research into the toxicity of Alar, which was heavily criticized by antiregulatory advocates, and Herbert Needleman's research into low dose lead poisoning. Needleman was accused of fraud and personally attacked.

Fox News commentator Steven Milloy often denigrates credible scientific research on topics like global warming, ozone depletion, and passive smoking as "junk science". The credibility of Milloy's website junkscience.com was questioned by Paul D. Thacker, a writer for The New Republic, in the wake of evidence that Milloy had received funding from Philip Morris, RJR Tobacco, and ExxonMobil. Thacker also noted that Milloy was receiving almost $100,000 a year in consulting fees from Philip Morris while he criticized the evidence regarding the hazards of second-hand smoke as junk science. Following the publication of this article, the Cato Institute, which had hosted the junkscience.com site, ceased its association with the site and removed Milloy from its list of adjunct scholars.

Tobacco industry documents reveal that Philip Morris executives conceived of the "Whitecoat Project" in the 1980s as a response to emerging scientific data on the harmfulness of second-hand smoke. The goal of the Whitecoat Project, as conceived by Philip Morris and other tobacco companies, was to use ostensibly independent "scientific consultants" to spread doubt in the public mind about scientific data through invoking concepts like junk science. According to epidemiologist David Michaels, Assistant Secretary of Energy for Environment, Safety, and Health in the Clinton Administration, the tobacco industry invented the "sound science" movement in the 1980s as part of their campaign against the regulation of second-hand smoke.

David Michaels has argued that, since the U.S. Supreme Court ruling in Daubert v. Merrell Dow Pharmaceuticals, Inc., lay judges have become "gatekeepers" of scientific testimony and, as a result, respected scientists have sometimes been unable to provide testimony so that corporate defendants are "increasingly emboldened" to accuse adversaries of practicing junk science.

== Notable cases ==
American psychologist Paul Cameron has been designated by the Southern Poverty Law Center (SPLC) as an anti-gay extremist and a purveyor of "junk science". Cameron's research has been heavily criticized for unscientific methods and distortions which attempt to link homosexuality with pedophilia. In one instance, Cameron claimed that lesbians are 300 times more likely to get into car accidents. The SPLC states his work has been continually cited in some sections of the media despite being discredited. Cameron was expelled from the American Psychological Association in 1983.

== Combatting junk science ==
In 1995, the Union of Concerned Scientists launched the Sound Science Initiative, a national network of scientists committed to debunking junk science through media outreach, lobbying, and developing joint strategies to participate in town meetings or public hearings. In its newsletter on Science and Technology in Congress, the American Association for the Advancement of Science also recognized the need for increased understanding between scientists and lawmakers: "Although most individuals would agree that sound science is preferable to junk science, fewer recognize what makes a scientific study 'good' or 'bad'." The American Dietetic Association, criticizing marketing claims made for food products, has created a list of "Ten Red Flags of Junk Science".

== See also ==
- Agnotology – Study of culturally induced ignorance or doubt
- Antiscience – Attitudes that reject science and the scientific method
- "British scientists" – Russian Internet meme
- Cargo cult science – 1985 autobiographical book by Richard Feynman
- Cyril Burt – English educational psychologist (1883–1971)
- Daubert standard – Expert witness evidence rule in American law for admissibility
- Denialism – Denial of basic facts and concepts that are accepted by the scientific consensus
- Factoid – Invented claim or trivial fact
- Fringe theory – Idea which departs from accepted scholarship in the field
- Fringe science – Inquiries far outside of mainstream science
- Frye standard – U.S. legal test on the admissibility of scientific evidence
- List of topics characterized as pseudoscience
- Normative science – Aspect of science
- Pathological science – Area of research which persists despite being widely discredited
- Pseudoscience – Unscientific claims wrongly presented as scientific
- Science by press conference – Aspect of science news
- Scientific literacy – Ability to understand science
- Scientific method – Interplay between observation, experiment, and theory in science
