= Military journalism in the United States =

This article pertains to the subject of journalists who write for the U.S. military, as distinct from those who write about the military.

According to JP 1-02, United States Department of Defense Dictionary of Military and Associated Terms, a military journalist is "A U.S. Service member or Department of Defense civilian employee providing photographic, print, radio, or television command information for military internal audiences. See also command information. (JP 3-61)"

== Definition ==
Military journalists are part Public Affairs, defined by JP 1-02 as "Those public information, command information, and community relations activities directed toward both the external and internal publics with interest in the Department of Defense."

Command information, therefore, is just one of the responsibilities of Public Affairs set by Department of Defense policy. DoDD 5122.5 sets forth these Principles of Information:

E2.1. INFORMATION It is DoD policy to make available timely and accurate information so that the public, the Congress, and the news media may assess and understand the facts about national security and defense strategy. Requests for information from organizations and private citizens shall be answered quickly.

In carrying out that DoD policy, the following principles of information shall apply:

E2.1.1. Information shall be made fully and readily available, consistent with statutory requirements, unless its release is precluded by national security constraints or valid statutory mandates or exceptions. The "Freedom of Information Act" will be supported in both letter and spirit.

E2.1.2. A free flow of general and military information shall be made available, without censorship or propaganda, to the men and women of the Armed Forces and their dependents.

E2.1.3. Information will not be classified or otherwise withheld to protect the Government from criticism or embarrassment.

E2.1.4. Information shall be withheld when disclosure would adversely affect national security, threaten the safety or privacy of U.S. Government personnel or their families, violate the privacy of the citizens of the United States, or be contrary to law.

E2.1.5. The Department of Defense's obligation to provide the public with information on DoD major programs may require detailed Public Affairs (PA) planning and coordination in the Department of Defense and with the other Government Agencies. Such activity is to expedite the flow of information to the public; propaganda has no place in DoD public affairs programs. DODD 5122.5, Sep. 27, 2000

JP 1-02 defines propaganda as "Any form of communication in support of national objectives designed to influence the opinions, emotions, attitudes, or behavior of any group in order to benefit the sponsor, either directly or indirectly."

The effort to counter enemy propaganda, therefore, both directly and indirectly benefits the sponsor. It has been a function of Psychological Operations (PSYOP) and not Public Affairs. JP 1-02 defines Counterpropaganda Operations as "Those psychological operations (PSYOP) activities that identify adversary propaganda, contribute to situational awareness, and serve to expose adversary attempts to influence friendly populations and military forces. (JP 3-53)"

Each branch of service has regulations that further define the roles of military journalists, but in a time of war, for example, Doctrine for Public Affairs in Joint Operations (JP 3-61) "provides joint doctrine for public affairs support during joint operations and US military support to news media in conjunction with military operations."

JP 3-61 states, "PA must be aware of the practice of PSYOP, but should have no role in planning or executing these operations."

The responsibilities of Public Affairs vs PSYOP are, therefore, fundamentally different.

JP 3-61 of May 14, 1997 contained no references to adversary propaganda. JP 3-61 was updated May 9, 2005 to include 16 references to adversary propaganda, which includes this revision:

"Public affairs counters propaganda and disinformation by providing a continuous flow of credible, reliable, timely, and accurate information to military members, their families, the media, and the public. This capability allows PA to help defeat adversary efforts to diminish national will, degrade morale, and turn world opinion against friendly operations. PA must be engaged in operational planning, have visibility into domestic and international press reports, as well as relevant intelligence, understand common adversary propaganda techniques, and be very aggressive by anticipating and countering adversary propaganda—putting accurate, complete information out first so that friendly forces gain the initiative and remain the preferred source of information. Gaining and maintaining the information initiative in a conflict can help discredit and undermine adversary propaganda. ... PA operations keep military members and their families informed about operations, events, and issues to counter adversary propaganda efforts, and reduce stress and uncertainty, and other factors that may undermine mission accomplishment."

The impact of this conflicting update means that the military journalist is required by doctrine to never "influence the opinions, emotions, attitudes, or behavior of any group in order to benefit the sponsor, either directly or indirectly" while at the same time "help defeat adversary efforts to diminish national will, degrade morale, and turn world opinion against friendly operations" and "to counter adversary propaganda efforts, and reduce stress and uncertainty, and other factors that may undermine mission accomplishment".

The military journalist is required by doctrine to participate in counter propaganda efforts, even though the same doctrine defines those efforts as a function of PSYOP, which is something Public Affairs should never execute, according to the same doctrine.

Military journalists must rely on the Combatant Commander's responsibility, IAW JP 3-61, to "Ensure planned ground rules for releasing information to civilian media apply equally to military journalists and broadcasters."

Then military journalists are unable to release information until it is cleared by a designated release authority, a Public Affairs Officer, whose responsibility is to coordinate and synchronize efforts with PSYOP. Despite the information being releasable according to the DOD Principles of Information, the official policy of "Maximum disclosure with minimum delay", and does not violate Operations Security (OPSEC) or threaten national security, any number of subjective factors arising from public perception cause a military journalist's information to be withheld from public release, some of which are detailed in DODI 5230.29. According to which, "All information submitted for review to OSR must first be coordinated within the originating DoD Component to ensure that it reflects the organization’s policy position."

An additional contradiction in doctrine then arises when news does not reflect "the organization’s policy position." Added to which, all news that is released must reflect the organization's policy position, despite doctrine prohibiting information "in order to benefit the sponsor, either directly or indirectly" and other doctrine encouraging the "free flow of information."

The Army's policy for military journalists is further clarified in FM 46-1: "Not all news is good news ... the Army and its operations will be both positive and negative. ... PAOs cannot control media coverage or guarantee positive media products. DoD policy is that information will not be classified or otherwise withheld to protect the government from criticism or embarrassment. Information can only be withheld when its disclosure would adversely affect national and operations security or threaten the safety or privacy of members of the military community. ... It is DoD and Army policy to take an active approach to providing information. The Army will practice the principle of "maximum disclosure with minimum delay", even though this will sometimes result in the publication of stories which are not favorable to the command. ... Because the Army is an agency of the U.S. government, its internal audiences, local community members, and members of the American public as a whole, have a right to know about its operations. More importantly, the Army has an obligation to keep these audiences informed. ... Public affairs operations should employ an active approach. PAOs must take the lead in contributing to accurate, credible, and balanced coverage by practicing maximum disclosure with minimum delay."

Yet the same doctrine states, "Public affairs operations should be planned and executed to influence the presentation of information about the force by providing truthful, complete, and timely information that communicates the Army perspective", despite conflicting doctrine that denounces propaganda to "influence the opinions, emotions, attitudes, or behavior of any group in order to benefit the sponsor, either directly or indirectly".

In other Army doctrine explaining an Information Operations Estimate, FM 3–13, "IO-cell members—especially the PSYOP, civil-military operations, and public affairs (PA) representatives—identify how best to influence the attitudes and actions of the civilian populace..." and in a Commander's Guidance example, "Use PA to favorably influence the population in the AO and worldwide. Emphasize the lead role of the ASA and tell the truth: that we are here to assist a well-trained army accomplish a worthwhile mission." The Public Affairs Officer must help, "ensure an integrated strategy and a unified effort to communicate the Army’s perspective and to favorably portray tactical and operational objectives."

One distinctly effective way (of many) that suppresses military journalism in conflict with this "perspective" or "organizational policy" is taught outside of official, high-level, DoD policy at the Defense Information School, where military journalists and Public Affairs Officers are trained:

Command Messages: "plain or secret language" that "communicate the command's position in everything we do" which are designed for informing and "persuading – through accurately provided information – those publics to support and accept the action." This is a "Command Message (your organization's policy or position)"

Another distinctly effective way that suppresses civilian journalism in conflict with these "command messages" is to employ:

Media ground rules: Guidelines that media must adhere to if they want to continue getting support from the military. One of 20 media ground rules, as of October 15, 2009, that applies equally to civilian and military journalists in the CJTF-82's Area of Operations (AO) in Afghanistan, for example, is "During interviews, no questions will be asked about the politics of the military. (e.g. Iraq war, equipment, readiness, funding, etc.)" Most ground rules are justified by Operations Security. Funding?

These policies remain despite the Commander in Chief, Barack Obama's Open Government Directive that conveys the, "Government should be transparent. Transparency promotes accountability and provides information for citizens about what their Government is doing."

The U.S. military journalist, therefore, is a journalist whose job, at the highest level of accountability, is defined by an obligation to fully inform the public without design to directly or indirectly benefit the military, but who must also fight subjective policy, ambiguous definitions, and conflicting doctrine designed to deceive the public with hidden political agendas.

The military has been increasingly spending billions to do so, in which Sheldon Rampton, research director for the Committee on Media and Democracy, calls a "massive apparatus selling the military to us."

== Notable military journalists ==
- Joe Rosenthal
- Chelsea Manning

== See also ==
- Assistant to the Secretary of Defense for Public Affairs
- Demonizing the enemy
- Embedded journalism
- Psychological warfare
