= Move to Amend =

American nonprofit organization

Move To Amend
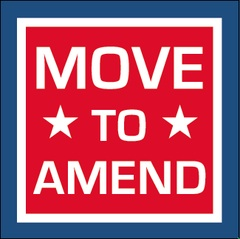
- Formation: 2010
- Type: Nonprofit organization
- Purpose: Political and social advocacy
- Headquarters: Sacramento, California
- Location: United States
- Method: Education, Lobbying, Resolution, and ballot campaigns
- National Co-Directors: Greg Coleridge, Alfonso Saldana, Jennie Spanos, Katie Krasinski, Cole Bennett
- Website: www.movetoamend.org

Move to Amend is a national, non-partisan, grassroots organization that seeks to blunt corporate power by amending the United States Constitution to end corporate personhood and state that money is not speech. The group was created in response to the 2010 Supreme Court ruling Citizens United v. Federal Election Commission, which held that corporations have a First Amendment right to make expenditures from their general treasuries supporting or opposing candidates for political office, arguing that the Court's decision disrupts the democratic process by granting disproportionate influence to the wealthy. Move to Amend advocates for the "We the People" Amendment, currently in Congress as H.J.Res. 54, to establish that constitutional rights are reserved for natural persons only and require the regulation and disclosure of spending in U.S. elections.

== Background ==
In 2009, several national organizations including the Women's International League for Peace and Freedom, the Program on Corporations, and Democracy (POCLAD) and Democracy Unlimited of Humboldt County (DUHC) now Democracy Unlimited submitted an amicus curiae authored by former Massachusetts assistant attorney general Jeff Clements to the Supreme Court in Citizens United v. Federal Election Commission, a U.S. constitutional law case concerning the regulation of independent political expenditures by corporations, which the non-profit organization Citizens United challenged on the grounds of violating the First Amendment’s freedom of speech. The brief argued against Citizens United and called for the court to reverse its precedents on corporate personhood, citing the 1886 case of Santa Clara County v. Southern Pacific Railroad Co. that preceded the extension of constitutional protections to corporations under the Fourteenth Amendment.

When the Court ruled to allow for corporations to make political expenditures from their general treasuries under the First Amendment's free speech rights in January 2010, several organizers and attorneys from those organizations behind the brief launched Move to Amend as a national campaign to overturn the Citizens United ruling, arguing that the Court’s decision disrupts the democratic process by granting disproportionate influence to the wealthy with the intent of promoting corporate power at the expense of ordinary citizens.

== Resolutions and ballot campaigns ==
Move to Amend's strategy has included grassroots organizing to lobby elected officials and candidates to pass local resolutions and ordinances through municipalities, which call on state and federal representatives to support a 28th Amendment and may include holding a "Democracy Day" public hearing. As of November 2023, over 840 local governments and 22 states have passed resolutions and ordinances supporting a constitutional amendment to address the Citizens United ruling." Over 300 resolutions were passed by voters via ballot initiatives, including statewide initiatives in Colorado, Montana, California and Washington.

Local affiliates of Move to Amend have helped pass many such resolutions supporting the language of the We the People Amendment, including the Los Angeles City Council which voted unanimously to end constitutional rights for corporations in 2011. In Ohio, local ordinances supporting the amendment and creating a "Democracy Day" public hearing to examine the local impact of political influence by corporations have been passed by municipal governments and voters via ballot initiatives, including Cleveland and Toledo. In Wisconsin, a partner of Move to Amend - Wisconsin United to Amend WIUTA, is building the movement for this amendment. As of 2023, 170 municipalities have passed resolutions, comprising 61% (3.5 million) of Wisconsin residents. WIUTA is also bringing the faith communities into the movement. As of 2023, 10 faith congregations have also passed resolutions calling for the amendment. The Outreach Director, George Penn, can be reached through their site at WIUTA.org.

== Leadership ==
The group has included organizers and attorneys from several national organizations among its leadership, including:

- Greg Coleridge, Alfonso Saldana, Jennie Spanos, Katie Krasinski and Cole Bennett, Move to Amend Co-Directors
- Kaitlin Sopoci-Belknap, Move to Amend’s former national director and director of Democracy Unlimited of Humboldt County
- David Cobb, 2004 Green Party presidential candidate and principal of POCLAD
- Riki Ott, a co-director of Ultimate Civics, is a co-founder
- Ben Manski, an executive director of the Liberty Tree Foundation
- George Friday, national steering committee member of the Independent Progressive Politics Network
- Lisa Graves, executive director for the Center for Media and Democracy
- Nancy Price, co-chair of the Alliance for Democracy and committee chair for Women’s International League for Peace & Freedom
- Jerome Scott, a member of the League of Revolutionary Black Workers and founding director of Project South
- Laura Bonham, a co-founder of Progressive Democrats of America and co-chair of the Justice Party
- Egberto Willies, Houston Peace and Justice Center Board Member, Coffee Party USA Board Member, Pacifica National Board member.
- Maria Agosto, a member of the Poor People's Economic Human Rights Campaign (PPEHRC)
