= Paul Manning (journalist) =

American broadcast journalist (??–1995)

Paul Manning (died 1995) was an American broadcast journalist. He worked closely with Edward R. Murrow during World War II as a correspondent for CBS Radio, and with the Mutual Broadcasting System later on in the war.

== Biography ==
=== The Writing 69th ===
Manning flew at least one mission with the Eighth Air Force on Oct. 9, 1943.

In February 1943, eight American civilian and military journalists participated in a training program with the United States Eighth Air Force. The goal of the program was to prepare the men for high altitude bombing runs over Germany. In a week-long training course over the skies of Bovingdon, England the men learned how to adjust to high altitude, identify enemy planes, and parachute. They were trained how to shoot weapons as well, despite the rule against non-combatant firing weapons in combat.

The men of The Writing 69th, originally known as the Flying Typewriters or the Legion of the Doomed, included: Walter Cronkite of United Press, Homer Bigart of the New York Herald Tribune Gladwin Hill of the Associated Press, Manning of CBS Radio, Robert Post of The New York Times, Andy Rooney of the military paper Stars and Stripes, Denton Scott of the military magazine Yank, and William Wade of the International News Service.

Those men prepared to fly their first mission on Feb. 26, 1943. American B-17s and B-24s prepared to bomb a Focke-Wulf aircraft factory in Bremen, Germany. Overcast skies diverted the group to the submarine pens at Wilhelmshaven, a secondary target. Six of the eight reporters in the program flew that day. Manning did not fly but Bigart, Cronkite, Hill, Post, Rooney, and Wade did.

As the group neared Oldenburg, Germany the plane Post was in came under fire from German fighter planes. The plane exploded in mid-air, killing Post and eight others. Post's death disbanded the Writing 69th, though others, including Manning, did fly missions afterward.

=== Speechwriter ===
After the war he worked as a speechwriter for Nelson Rockefeller.

=== Author ===
Manning's Martin Bormann — Nazi in Exile was published in 1981. In 1986, his book, titled Hirohito, The War Years, was released. It detailed the relationship between Emperor Hirohito and General Douglas MacArthur.

== Books ==
- Hirohito, The War Years, Dodd, Mead (1986) ISBN 9780396087915, Bantam Books (1989) ISBN 9780553347951
- Martin Bormann — Nazi in Exile, Lyle Stuart Inc (1981), ISBN 0-8184-0309-8 PDF

== See also ==
- Martin Bormann
