= Campaign finance reform amendment =

Proposed amendments to the United States Constitution

A campaign finance reform amendment refers to any proposed amendment to the United States Constitution to authorize greater restrictions on spending related to political speech, and to overturn Supreme Court rulings which have narrowed such laws under the First Amendment. Several amendments have been filed since Citizens United v. Federal Election Commission and the Occupy movement.

== History ==
In response to the Occupy Wall Street protests and the worldwide Occupy movement calling for U.S. campaign finance reform eliminating corporate influence in politics, among other reforms, Representative Ted Deutch introduced the "Outlawing Corporate Cash Undermining the Public Interest in our Elections and Democracy" (OCCUPIED) constitutional amendment on November 18, 2011. The OCCUPIED amendment would outlaw the use of for-profit corporation money in U.S. election campaigns and give Congress and states the authority to create a public campaign finance system. Unions and nonprofit organizations will still be able to contribute to campaigns. On November 1, 2011, Senator Tom Udall also introduced a constitutional amendment in Congress to reform campaign finance which would allow Congress and state legislatures to establish public campaign finance. Two other constitutional campaign finance reform amendments were introduced in Congress in November, 2011. Similar amendments have been advanced by Dylan Ratigan, Karl Auerbach, Cenk Uygur through Wolf PAC, and other political organizations, such as Move to Amend and American Promise.

Harvard law professor and Creative Commons board member Lawrence Lessig had called for a constitutional convention in a September 24–25, 2011 conference co-chaired by the Tea Party Patriots' national coordinator, in Lessig's October 5 book, Republic, Lost: How Money Corrupts Congress – and a Plan to Stop It, and at the Occupy protest in Washington, D.C. Reporter Dan Froomkin said the book offers a manifesto for the Occupy Wall Street protestors, focusing on the core problem of corruption in both political parties and their elections, and Lessig provides credibility to the movement. Lessig's initial constitutional amendment would allow legislatures to limit political contributions from non-citizens, including corporations, anonymous organizations, and foreign nationals, and he also supports public campaign financing and electoral college reform to establish the one person, one vote principle. Lessig's web site convention.idea.informer.com allows anyone to propose and vote on constitutional amendments. On October 15, the Occupy Wall Street Demands Working Group, published the 99 Percent Declaration of demands, goals, and solutions, including a call to amend the U.S. Constitution to reform campaign finance. Occupy movement protesters have joined the call for a constitutional amendment.

== Background ==
While Citizens United is the Supreme Court case most cited by advocates for a campaign finance reform amendment, the underlying precedent for extending constitutional rights to corporations under the doctrine of corporate personhood is rooted in more than a century of Supreme Court decisions dating back to the 19th century. The debate of "corporate constitutional rights" can be parsed into the legal definitions of corporation and personhood, the latter term being controversial in regards to the philosophical debate over where human personhood begins and the legal debate over where legal personhood ends. Under US law, corporations are extended at least some legal rights and responsibilities as natural persons, such as the right to enter into contracts and to sue or be sued. However, the framers of the US Constitution had originally reserved constitutional protections for individual citizens and had not intended such protections to be inherent or inalienable for their organizations incorporated under law.

The first time the Supreme Court entertained the idea of corporations having constitutional rights was in 1886's Santa Clara County v. Southern Pacific Railroad Company, when Chief Justice Morrison Waite began oral arguments by stating, "The court does not wish to hear argument on the question whether the provision in the Fourteenth Amendment to the Constitution, which forbids a State to deny to any person within its jurisdiction the equal protection of the laws, applies to these corporations. We are all of the opinion that it does." While the Chief Justice Waite's statement in Santa Clara County was inserted in the headnote, which was not part of the Court's opinion and not considered precedent, the doctrine was clearly affirmed in subsequent cases in Pembina Consolidated Silver Mining Co. v. Pennsylvania (1888) and Minneapolis and Saint Louis Railway v. Beckwith (1889).

In the 307 Fourteenth Amendment cases heard by the Supreme Court in the years following Santa Clara County, 288 cases involved corporations compared to 19 cases involving African Americans, its intended recipients. The Court reaffirmed its Santa Clara County precedent in the landmark case Lochner v. New York (1905), which expanded corporate deregulation under the Fourteenth Amendment's Equal Protection and Due Process Clauses. A year later, the Court extended corporate personhood to include search and seizure protections under the Fourth Amendment in Hale v. Henkel (1906), from which dissenting Justice John Marshall Harlan stated, "to look into the books, records and papers of a corporation of its own creation, to ascertain whether that corporation has obeyed or is defying the law, will be greatly curtailed, if not destroyed." The Court later deemed in Pennsylvania Coal Co. v. Mahon (1922) that a regulation by state government is a form of takings and ruled that corporations are protected from "private lands being taken for public use without just compensation" and therefore entitled to compensation for lost profit under the Fifth Amendment. During this period known as the Lochner era, the Court cited the Fourteenth Amendment's Due Process Clause in halting over 200 regulations intended for corporations. Despite the Court's recognition of corporate personhood under the Fourteenth Amendment, the Equal Protection Clause would not be applied to women until the case Reed v. Reed (1971).

In the case of Citizens United, the extension of corporate personhood to include free speech rights was premised on the First Amendment's Freedom of the Press Clause, which protects associations of individuals, including individual speakers. The Court ruled that Corporations (as associations of individuals) are entitled to free speech rights because the First Amendment does not allow prohibitions of speech based on the identity of the speaker. Furthermore, the Court extended its precedents set in Buckley v. Valeo (1976), which asserted corporate spending to political candidates and parties is the equivalent of free speech, and First National Bank of Boston v. Bellotti (1978), which established that non-media business corporations can give unrestricted money to "influence or affect" voter opinions in state political referendums.

== Proposed amendments ==
=== 1. People's Rights Amendment (2011) ===
On November 15, 2011, Representative James P. McGovern introduced the People's Rights Amendment, a proposal to limit the Constitution's protections only to the rights of natural persons, and not corporations. This amendment would overturn the United States Supreme Court decision in Citizens United v. Federal Election Commission.

=== 2. Saving American Democracy Amendment (2011) ===
The Saving American Democracy Amendment is a United States constitutional amendment proposed in December 2011 by Senators Mark Begich (D-Alaska) and Bernie Sanders (I-Vermont) "to expressly exclude for-profit corporations from the rights given to natural persons by the Constitution of the United States, prohibit corporate spending in all elections, and affirm the authority of Congress and the States to regulate corporations and to regulate and set limits on all election contributions and expenditures." The Saving American Democracy Amendment was meant to overturn the 2010 United States Supreme Court decision Citizens United v. Federal Election Commission, which stated that freedom of speech prohibited the government from restricting independent political expenditures by for-profit and nonprofit corporations. This was the first constitutional amendment proposed by Sanders in his two decades in Congress. The text of the amendment reads as follows:

Section 1. The rights protected by the Constitution of the United States are the rights of natural persons and do not extend to for-profit corporations, limited liability companies, or other private entities established for business purposes or to promote business interests under the laws of any state, the United States, or any foreign state.

Section 2. Such corporate and other private entities established under law are subject to regulation by the people through the legislative process so long as such regulations are consistent with the powers of Congress and the States and do not limit the freedom of the press.

Section 3. Such corporate and other private entities shall be prohibited from making contributions or expenditures in any election of any candidate for public office or the vote upon any ballot measure submitted to the people.

Section 4. Congress and the States shall have the power to regulate and set limits on all election contributions and expenditures, including a candidate's own spending, and to authorize the establishment of political committees to receive, spend, and publicly disclose the sources of those contributions and expenditures.

The amendment was introduced in the Senate on December 8, 2011. It was read twice and referred to the Committee on the Judiciary. The Saving American Democracy amendment proposed in the Senate was a companion bill to one proposed in the House by Representative Ted Deutch (D-Florida). Deutch's amendment was referred to the House's Subcommittee on the Constitution. Both Sanders' Saving American Democracy Amendment and Deutch's amendment failed to pass.

=== 3. Democracy for All Amendment (2014; 2015; 2021) ===
The Democracy for All Amendment was introduced in multiple sessions of Congress beginning with the 113th. It would grant Congress and the States the ability to limit the raising and spending of money in campaigns for public office. It would also grant Congress and the States the ability to distinguish between a natural person and an artificial entity, such as a corporation. The resolution was introduced in the Senate by Senator Tom Udall and in the House by Representative Ted Deutch during both congresses. During the 113th congress the resolution received 129 co-sponsors in the House (all Democrats), and 48 co-sponsors in the Senate (46 Democrats, 2 Independents). In the Senate the resolution was never voted on, and in the House it was sent to House Subcommittee on the Constitution and Civil Justice.

In the 2015 (114th Congress) version the resolution received 162 co-sponsors (161 Democrats, 1 Republican) in the House, while in the Senate, the resolution received 42 co-sponsors (40 Democrats, 2 Independents). The resolution was sent to the House Subcommittee on the Constitution and Civil Justice, and Senate Committee on the Judiciary, but failed to pass either.

The amendment was reintroduced in 2021 (in the 117th United States Congress) as House Joint Resolution 1 (H.J.Res. 1).

=== 4. We the People Amendment (2013; 2015; 2017; 2019) ===
The We The People Amendment is a joint resolution to amend the United States Constitution to abolish the doctrines of corporate personhood and of money equalling political speech. It was introduced by Representative Rick Nolan as H.J.Res. 29 on February 23, 2013, and was re-introduced as H.J.Res. 48 on April 29, 2015, H.J.Res. 48 on January 30, 2017. It was again introduced by Representative Pramila Jayapal as H.J.Res. 48 on February 22, 2019. The amendment was proposed in response to the implications presented in the U.S. Supreme Court's ruling in Citizens United v. Federal Election Commission (2010), a U.S. constitutional law case concerning the regulation of independent political expenditures by corporations, which the nonprofit organization Citizens United challenged on the grounds of purportedly violating the First Amendment's freedom of speech.

The We the People Amendment would establish that constitutional rights are reserved for natural persons only, that artificial entities — corporations, limited liability companies, and other incorporated entities established by the laws of any state, the United States, or any foreign state — have no rights under the Constitution and are subject to regulation through federal, state, or local law, and further establishes that privileges of such entities cannot be construed as inherent or inalienable. It would require federal, state, and local governments to regulate, limit, or prohibit political contributions or expenditures, including those made by a candidate, and would require any permissible political contributions and expenditures to be publicly disclosed. It would also prohibit the courts from construing the spending of money to influence elections as a form of protected speech under the First Amendment or from holding that the amendment would abridge the freedom of the press. The text of the amendment reads as follows:

Section 1. The rights protected by the Constitution of the United States are the rights of natural persons only. Artificial entities, such as corporations, limited liability companies, and other entities, established by the laws of any State, the United States, or any foreign state shall have no rights under this Constitution and are subject to regulation by the People, through Federal, State, or local law. The privileges of artificial entities shall be determined by the People, through Federal, State, or local law, and shall not be construed to be inherent or inalienable.

Section 2. Federal, State and local government shall regulate, limit, or prohibit contributions and expenditures, including a candidate's own contributions and expenditures, to ensure that all citizens, regardless of their economic status, have access to the political process, and that no person gains, as a result of that person's money, substantially more access or ability to influence in any way the election of any candidate for public office or any ballot measure. Federal, State, and local governments shall require that any permissible contributions and expenditures be publicly disclosed. The judiciary shall not construe the spending of money to influence elections to be speech under the First Amendment.

Section 3. Nothing contained in this amendment shall be construed to abridge the freedom of the press.

==== Introduction ====
In the 113th Congress, the We the People Amendment received 3 co-sponsors from the Democratic Party. In the 114th Congress, it garnered 23 co-sponsors (22 Democrats, 1 Republican). In the 115th Congress, it had 66 co-sponsors (65 Democrats, 1 Republican). In the 116th Congress, it had 75 co-sponsors (all Democrats). In the 117th Congress, it had 94 co-sponsors (again, all Democrats).

As of July 2019, the joint resolution is in the House Subcommittee on the Constitution and Civil Justice under the House Committee on the Judiciary.

=== 5. For Our Freedom Amendment (in progress) ===
The For Our Freedom Amendment has not yet been introduced to Congress, but citizens, lawmakers, and scholars from across the political spectrum helped shape its language. Although the Supreme Court has decided that many campaign finance laws are inherently unconstitutional, were For Our Freedom to pass, that would no longer be an issue if the Constitution explicitly rejected that notion and stated that reasonable regulations of political spending are permissible. Although the amendment would not mandate any specific reforms, or advance the agenda of a specific party, it would give elected officials the freedom and flexibility to enact policies that reflect the will of their constituents, such as creating campaign spending limits and banning dark and foreign donations.

The text of the amendment reads as follows:

Section 1. We the People have compelling sovereign interests in the freedom of speech, representative self-government, federalism, the integrity of the electoral process, and the political equality of natural persons.

Section 2. Nothing in this Constitution shall be construed to forbid Congress or the States, within their respective jurisdictions, from reasonably regulating and limiting contributions and spending in campaigns, elections, or ballot measures.

Section 3. Congress and the States shall have the power to implement and enforce this article by appropriate legislation and may distinguish between natural persons and artificial entities, including by prohibiting artificial entities from raising and spending money in campaigns, elections, or ballot measures.

== Amendment advocacy and support ==
Organizations which advocate for an anti-corporate personhood amendment to the Constitution include Move to Amend, Wolf PAC, Mayday PAC, Free Speech For People and American Promise.
