= Herbert Needleman =

American researcher (1927–2017)

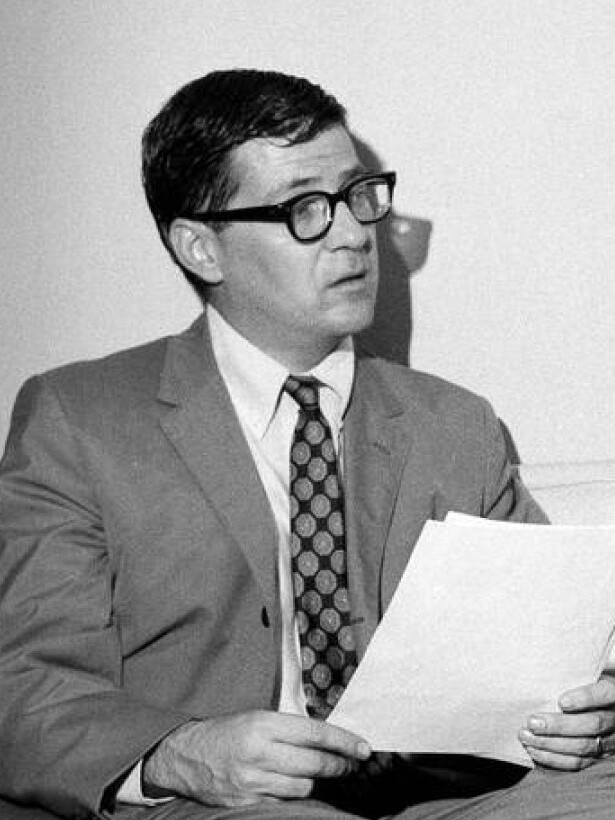
- Needleman in 1967
- Born: December 13, 1927; Philadelphia, Pennsylvania
- Died: July 18, 2017 (aged 89); Pittsburgh, Pennsylvania
- Education: Muhlenberg College, University of Pennsylvania
- Known for: Lead poisoning research
- Spouse: Shirley Weinstein - divorced Roberta Pizor
- Children: three
- Scientific career
- Fields: Pediatrics, child psychiatry
- Workplaces: University of Pittsburgh, Alliance to End Childhood Lead Poisoning

Herbert Leroy Needleman (December 13, 1927 – July 18, 2017) was an American physician who researched the neurodevelopmental damage caused by lead poisoning. He was a pediatrician, child psychiatrist, researcher and professor at the University of Pittsburgh, an elected member of the Institute of Medicine, and the founder of the Alliance to End Childhood Lead Poisoning, which was later known as the Alliance for Healthy Homes and since merged with the National Center for Healthy Housing.

Needleman played a role in securing some of the most significant environmental health protections of the 20th century, resulting in a fivefold reduction in the prevalence of lead poisoning among children in the United States by the early 1990s. Despite strong resistance from lead-related industries, which made him the target of frequent attacks, Needleman persisted in campaigning to educate stakeholders, including parents and government panels, about the dangers of lead poisoning. Needleman has been credited with having played a key role in triggering environmental safety measures that reduced average blood lead levels by an estimated 78 percent between 1976 and 1991. He died in Pittsburgh in 2017.

His nephew, Dr. Robert Needleman, is also a pediatrician, and published an updated and revised version of "Dr. Spock's Baby And Child Care" in 2005

== Education ==
Needleman earned his BS from Muhlenberg College in Allentown, Pennsylvania in 1948, and his MD from the University of Pennsylvania in 1952. He was Jewish. He trained in pediatrics at the Children's Hospital of Philadelphia and served as chief resident. Needleman completed a fellowship in pediatric cardiology and rheumatic fever through the National Institutes of Health.

== Career ==
After practicing family pediatrics in Philadelphia and neonatology at Pennsylvania Hospital, Dr. Needleman completed a residency in psychiatry at Temple University Health Sciences Center, also in Philadelphia. From 1970 to 1972, he was an assistant professor of psychiatry at Temple University, and from 1972 to 1981, he was a professor at Harvard University Medical School in Boston, Massachusetts. From 1981, he was a professor of child psychiatry and pediatrics at the University of Pittsburgh School of Medicine.

=== Lead poisoning research ===
In the 1970s, Needleman conducted a study at Harvard Medical School that yielded strong evidence of lead, even at very low levels, affecting a child's IQ. By measuring levels of lead in children’s deciduous teeth, Needleman provided the first evidence that low level lead exposure at the time these teeth were formed not only reduces IQ levels, but also shortens attention spans and delays acquisition of language proficiency. In studies that followed, he determined that lead poisoning had long-term implications for a child's attentiveness, behavior, and academic success.

In 1979, Needleman began the first large-scale study of intelligence and behavior in children with no outward signs of lead poisoning. His research showed that lead exposure was associated with an increased risk of dropping out of high school and reading disabilities. His research involved testing the concentration of lead in bones of 194 juveniles between the ages of twelve and eighteen who had been convicted in the Allegheny County Juvenile Court, and 146 students in regular high schools in Pittsburgh, Pennsylvania without behavioral problems. In 1996, findings from the research, reporting on the physical and behavioral problems caused by leaded gasoline and lead paint while linking lead exposure to anti-social behavior, were published in The Journal of the American Medical Association. The study found that delinquent children were four times more likely to have elevated concentrations of lead in their bones. According to Needleman, "Lead is a brain poison that interferes with the ability to restrain impulses. It's a life experience which gets into biology and increases a child's risk for doing bad things."

After extensive scientific review, Needleman's findings were instrumental in convincing the Centers for Disease Control (CDC) to issue guidelines for the diagnosis and management of lead poisoning in children, in goading the Environmental Protection Agency (EPA) to mandate the removal of lead from gasoline, and in inducing the Consumer Product Safety Commission to ban lead from interior paints. Needleman's research also helped cause the Department of Housing and Urban Development (HUD) to remove lead from thousands of housing units across the US.

Needleman designed the first forward study of lead exposure during gestation, and showed that such exposure is associated with cognitive deficits later in life. His most recent research showed that boys with high levels of lead concentrated in their bones were more likely to develop aggressive or delinquent behavior, such as bullying, vandalism and shoplifting.

=== Raising Children Toxic Free ===
In Raising Children Toxic Free: How to Keep Your Child Safe from Lead, Asbestos, Pesticides, and Other Environmental Hazards (1996), Needleman and Philip J. Landrigan offer advice for parents and physicians on how to evaluate and minimize toxic exposure risks to lead, asbestos, pesticides, and other toxins. The authors also address practical means for ensuring community compliance with existing laws.

=== Committee of Responsibility ===
While an associate professor at Temple University's School of Medicine, Needleman was the chairman of the Committee of Responsibility (COR), throughout its existence between 1966 and 1974. COR, which sought to help civilians injured in the Vietnam War, was composed of medical personnel, scientists, clergymen, and citizens concerned about American involvement. In its efforts to assist injured Vietnamese children shelters were set up in Berkeley, California and Boston, Massachusetts, both called Vietnam House, and another in Saigon, where paraplegic children could be cared for and rehabilitated in their own country.

=== Allegations of scientific misconduct ===
Needleman's scientific methodology was challenged by Claire Ernhart, who said it did not adequately control for confounding variables and was subject to the multiple comparisons problem. In 1983, when the EPA was reviewing its air-quality standards, it rejected the results of both Needleman's and some of Ernhart's scientific work on the subject. At the urging of the Lead Industries Association (LIA), the EPA Science Advisory Board formed a six-member Expert Committee, including Sandra Scarr, that the LIA hoped would undermine Needleman. Needleman challenged this criticism and after giving him more money to reanalyze the data, the EPA reversed its position, and adopted his conclusions in 1986.

In 1990, a Superfund (industrial pollution cleanup) case was brought against the owners of a defunct lead mill in Utah, after it was found that houses had been built on the land where tailings had been deposited. The state hired Needleman as an expert witness, and the corporations in their defence turned to Ernhart and psychologist Sandra Scarr from the University of Virginia. Ernhart and Scarr had access to the raw data for a day, after which they were subject to a gag order to keep them from discussing the data in public. Based on the printouts, Scarr concluded that Needleman had discarded potentially significant explanatory variables after his first analysis failed to show a lead-IQ relationship until "he got the results he wanted". The two charged Needleman through the National Institute of Health with scientific misconduct.

Needleman said that the case against him was filed by a law firm from Philadelphia that refused to name the company paying them, although he wrote that Ernhart received $375,000 over seven years from the International Lead Zinc Research Organization (ILZRO). He says that against the advice of his university, he successfully fought to have the case held in public and was eventually exonerated. According to Scarr: "Eventually, Needleman was found guilty of misrepresentation and had to retract research reports in the journals that published them." However, no retractions were issued, only mild corrections. According to environmental psychology professor Colleen F. Moore, Scarr and Ernhart "found a published graph that was slightly in error, and Needleman eventually published a correction". The lawsuit and subsequent inquiry remain controversial; according to philosopher of science Clark N. Glymour, "Scarr and Ernhart are sometimes dismissed as tools of the lead industry, but I know of no evidence that they were other than sincere." However, Glymour thinks that Scarr and Ernhart were wrong on their methodological findings.

EPA scientist Joel Schwartz told Newsweek in 1991 that a reanalysis of Needleman's data incorporating the factor of age, which had been excluded, "found essentially the identical results". By that point, Needleman's research had been superseded by newer research used to justify even lower limits of allowable lead.

== Awards and recognition ==
- Dr. John V. Shankweiler Prize for outstanding student in biology, Muhlenberg College
- The first scientific studies award, the Academy of the Association For Children With Learning Disabilities
- Sarah L. Poiley Memorial Award, New York Academy of Sciences
- Charles Dana Award for Pioneering Achievement in Public Health
- Conservation Science Award, National Wildlife Federation
- Chancellor's Award For Public Service, University of Pittsburgh
- 1996 2nd Annual Heinz Award in the Environment
- Edward K. Barsky Award, The Physician's Forum
- 1997 Vernon Houk Award, The Society For Occupational And Environmental Health
- 1999 Distinguished Graduate Award, Perelman School of Medicine, University of Pennsylvania
- 2003 Prince Mahidol Award, Thailand
- 2004 Rachel Carson Award for Integrity, Center for Science in the Public Interest
- 2006 Distinguished Investigator Award, Neurotoxicology specialty section of the Society of Toxicology

== Published works ==
- 1980, Herbert L. Needleman, Low Level Lead Exposure: The clinical implications of current research, ISBN 0-89004-455-4
- 1991, Herbert L. Needleman (editor), Human Lead Exposure CRC Press, Boca Raton, Florida, ISBN 0-8493-6034-X
- 1994, Herbert L. Needleman, Philip J. Landrigan, Raising Children Toxic Free: How to Keep Your Child Safe from Lead, Asbestos, Pesticides, and Other Environmental Hazards, Farrar Straus & Giroux, Gordonsville, Virginia, ISBN 0-374-24643-2
- 1994, Herbert L. Needleman, David C. Bellinger, Prenatal Exposure to Toxicants: Developmental Consequences, Johns Hopkins University Press, Baltimore
- Needleman H. L. (1998). "Childhood lead poisoning : The promise and abandonment of primary prevention". American Journal of Public Health. 88: 1871–7. doi:10.2105/ajph.88.12.1871. PMC 1509047. PMID 9842392.
- Needleman Herbert L (2008). "The Case of Deborah Rice: Who Is the Environmental Protection Agency Protecting?". PLoS Biology. 6: e129. doi:10.1371/journal.pbio.0060129. PMC 2430913.

Other authors

- Rampton, S., Stauber, J., Trust Us, We're Experts 2001, p 95-7
