= Banana Republicans =

2004 book by Sheldon Rampton and John Stauber

- Author: Sheldon Rampton; John Stauber
- Cover artist: Tom Tomorrow
- Subject: Media bias, Republican Party
- Publisher: Jeremy P. Tarcher/Penguin
- Publication date: 2004
- Pages: 264
- ISBN: 1-58542-342-4
- OCLC: 54694701

Banana Republicans: How the Right Wing Is Turning America Into a One-Party State is a book by Sheldon Rampton and John Stauber of the Center for Media and Democracy. It was published in 2004.

In the book, Rampton and Stauber argue that a right-wing political machine, in the form of the Republican Party and its functionaries in the media, lobbying establishment and electoral system, is undermining dissent and squelching pluralistic politics in the United States.

In writing Banana Republicans, Rampton and Stauber experimented with collaborative research, inviting Disinfopedia users to contribute their own research and analysis while the book was being written.
