= Robert Post =

Robert Post may refer to:

- Robert Post (journalist) (1910–1943), reporter of The New York Times
- Robert Post (law professor) (born 1947), professor of law at Yale Law School
- Robert Post (musician) (born 1979), Norwegian singer-songwriter

== See also ==
- Robert Poste, the father of the heroine Flora Poste, in Cold Comfort Farm
