= John Bonifaz =

American lawyer

John C. Bonifaz
- Born: June 22, 1966 (age 60); Wilmington, Delaware
- Education: Brown University
- Occupations: Attorney and political activist

John C. Bonifaz (born 22 June 1966, in Wilmington, Delaware) is an Amherst-based attorney and political activist specializing in constitutional law and voting rights. He is the president and co-founder of Free Speech for People. He is also the founder of the National Voting Rights Institute and a former candidate for Massachusetts Secretary of the Commonwealth. In 1999, he received a MacArthur Fellowship.

== Constitutional challenge and hearings on 2003 invasion of Iraq ==
In February and March 2003, Bonifaz served as lead counsel for a coalition of US soldiers, parents of US soldiers, and members of Congress in John Doe I v. President Bush, a constitutional challenge to President Bush's authority to wage war against Iraq absent a congressional declaration of war or equivalent action. He argued that the President's planned first-strike invasion of Iraq violated the War Powers Clause of the US Constitution. The lawsuit was initially dismissed in February 2003 and in March 2003 the dismissal was upheld on appeal. Regarding the initial dismissal, Attorney Bonifaz said "They're not supposed to sideline ... Courts cannot shirk from responsibility when it looks like a political battle." Regarding the affirmation of the dismissal, the appeals court held "... the text of the October Resolution itself spells out justifications for a war and frames itself as an 'authorization' of such a war."

Bonifaz wrote the 2004 book Warrior-King: The Case for Impeaching George W. Bush, which chronicles that case and its meaning for the United States Constitution. The book argues that the Iraq War was illegal.

In the aftermath of the release of the Downing Street Memo in 2005, Bonifaz co-founded After Downing Street and wrote a memo to Congressman John Conyers of Michigan, the Ranking Democrat on the House Judiciary Committee, urging him to introduce a Resolution of Inquiry directing the House Judiciary Committee to launch a formal investigation into whether sufficient grounds exist for the House to impeach President George W. Bush. Bonifaz participated in a discussion with former CIA Analyst Ray McGovern led by Rep. Conyers, advocating Bush's impeachment for misrepresenting the case for the Iraq war.

== National Voting Rights Institute ==
Bonifaz is also the founder of the National Voting Rights Institute (NVRI), where he later served as general counsel. In 2006, NVRI formed a partnership with Demos and in 2007 Bonifaz signed on as a Senior Legal Fellow with Demos. Founded in 1994, NVRI serves as a legal and public education center dedicated to protecting the right of all citizens to vote and to participate in the electoral process.

For his work with NVRI, Bonifaz is a 1999 recipient of a MacArthur Foundation "genius" Fellowship. With the NVRI, Bonifaz argued for a legal strategy to campaign finance reform focused on the fourteenth amendment rather than the first amendment to the United States Constitution.

NVRI was lead counsel or co-counsel in a series of lawsuits in the late 1990s and early 2000s arguing that reasonably drawn political campaign spending limits do not violate the U.S. Constitutional protections of free speech. This campaign was a part of the larger campaign finance reform field. The campaign came to an end when the Supreme Court in June 2006 struck down Vermont's campaign spending limits law in the case Randall v. Sorrell. NVRI was co-counsel with the state of Vermont in defending that law. The Supreme Court had in 1976 struck down congressional campaign spending limits in the Buckley v. Valeo case. In the summer of 2009, the National Voting Rights Institute formally dissolved, all of its programs having been adopted by Demos.

== Massachusetts clean elections law ==
In 2002, the Massachusetts legislature declined to fund the clean elections law, a public financing measure passed by voters in 1998. Bonifaz and the NVRI sued Massachusetts on behalf of Warren Tolman, a candidate for governor who had qualified for public financing and was not receiving the money. The Massachusetts Supreme Judicial Court ruled that the legislature must fund a law passed by the voters that it has not repealed. When the legislature persisted in not releasing the necessary funds to pay Tolman and other candidates, Bonifaz went to court again, and secured a ruling allowing his coalition to force the sale of state property. The legislature repealed the clean elections law after the 2002 elections.

== Campaign for Secretary ==
In 2006, Bonifaz ran for the Democratic nomination to be Secretary of the Commonwealth of Massachusetts in 2006 against incumbent William F. Galvin. He declared his candidacy on December 1, 2005, before it was known whether Galvin would run for re-election or for governor. Galvin won the primary election, which was held on September 19, 2006.

During the campaign, Bonifaz was linked to the Green Party by his opponent, because he voted for Green Party presidential candidate Ralph Nader in Massachusetts in 2000, and because he received a campaign contribution from Jill Stein, the Green-Rainbow Party candidate for secretary of state. Jill Stein was one of the clients he represented in the Clean Elections lawsuit, and other clients from that case donated to his campaign, including Warren Tolman, a Democratic candidate for governor in 2002. After unenrolling from the Democratic Party prior to the 2000 election, Bonifaz later re-registered as a Democrat and has never been registered as a Green.

Bonifaz's campaign focused on election reform, promoting clean elections, same day registration, voting rights for minorities, and opposition to privately owned voting machines with proprietary software.

== Free Speech for People ==
Following the Citizens United decision, Bonifaz co-founded Free Speech for People with Jeff Clements. The group advocates for a new constitutional amendment to clarify that the Bill of Rights applies to people, not corporations.

== Background ==
Bonifaz has also litigated international human rights and environmental law cases, and, with his father Cristobal Bonifaz, has litigated against Chevron Corporation regarding pollution in the Lago Agrio oil field in the Ecuadorian Amazon. (Cristobal Bonifaz is a native of Ecuador.)

Bonifaz's great-grandfather was Neptalí Bonifaz, who was elected president of Ecuador in 1931, but was disqualified for the presidency by the National Congress.

A graduate of Brown University in 1987 and Harvard Law School cum laude in 1992, Bonifaz is married to Lissa Pierce Bonifaz. Lissa holds a doctorate in bilingual education.
