= Robert Post (journalist) =

American journalist (1910–1943)

Robert Perkins Post (September 8, 1910 – February 26, 1943) worked as a reporter for the New York Times during World War II. He was part of a group of eight reporters, known as the Legion of the Doomed or the Writing 69th, selected to fly bomber missions with United States Eighth Air Force.

== Early life ==
Post was the son of a well-to-do New York City lawyer; his family summered in a mansion called Strandhome on Long Island's Great South Bay. He decided to become a journalist while attending St. Paul's School in Concord, New Hampshire, and got his start working at the New York Evening World only a few weeks after graduating. While attending Harvard, Post spent his summer vacations working at various publications including the Putnam Patriot and the New York World.

== Career ==
Upon graduation from Harvard in 1932, Post took a position with the Boston American, and in 1933 he applied for a job with Arthur Krock, the head of the New York Times Washington bureau, as a junior correspondent. Krock, after telling Post to do it the hard way and work his way up, offered him a position as an office boy running messages for the phone operator. He took it. Post, however, briefly left Washington for New York City, where he worked on Fiorello H. La Guardia's mayoral re-election campaign and, simultaneously, his brother Langdon Ward Post's bid for borough president. After his brother lost, Post returned to Washington.

Post was in the Times Washington bureau from 1934 to 1938, working as a White House correspondent in 1936 and 1937. In 1935 he married Margaret "Margot" Lapsley in Brooklyn, Connecticut. After honeymooning in the West Indies, Post and his new wife settled in Washington while he worked at the Times. While in Washington, Post built a friendship with then President Franklin Roosevelt.

One of the more well known anecdotes revolving around Post and FDR involved the all-important question of whether or not Roosevelt would seek a third term. At a press conference Post asked FDR about his intentions to which Roosevelt gave a nonchalant reply and joked about the weather. Undeterred, Post pressed him on the issue. More than a little annoyed FDR retorted, "Bob, go put on the dunce cap and stand in the corner." As Roosevelt exited the press conference he gave Post a thumbs down. The press had quite the field day with the incident and used it as a microcosm on FDR dodging or ignoring important questions. Three years later FDR was indeed nominated for a third term and accepted. Post sent him a congratulatory message that said, "Who's the dunce now?"

In December 1937 Post found out he was to be moved to London. In London he reported on the Battle of Britain. He filed a number of stories on that battle and used to sit on Shakespeare Cliff, west of Dover and watch air battles unfold. As a firsthand witness to the bombing of London he put into words what he saw after a German air raid destroyed Commons Chamber of the Houses of Parliament and blew the roof off Westminster Abbey.

The sun rose red over London yesterday after one of the worst air raids that London has experienced. Weary and drawn after a night of horror and fire – a night that even women living alone spent in putting out incendiaries – London began to make a preliminary reckoning of what happened... It is perhaps not important to the historian that little shops have been blasted or that a street of little homes has been destroyed: but it is vital to men who own and work in those shops and live in those houses. But Londoners recovering from this raid – and though it was bad it is too early yet to say that it was one of the worst in history – felt a savage satisfaction when they read in their papers or heard on their radios that thirty-three raiders had been shot down, four by anti-aircraft fire and twenty-nine by fighters. It was good news and it would probably have been better news if all the speculation had been told, because it is probable that many more Nazi planes were damaged or brought down. Some speculations go far beyond the official figure and in any case it was a very fair percentage of the total raiders over England. – Robert Perkins Post, New York Times, May 12, 1941

By the early 1940s the Times London bureau included bureau chief Raymond "Pete" Daniell, Tania Long (who later married Daniell), David Anderson, Hal Denny, Walter Leysmith, Jamie MacDonald, Drew Middleton, James Reston, and Post. After a September 7, 1940, air raid destroyed their headquarters, Daniell moved the staff to the Savoy Hotel, where many journalists had gathered after the fall of France.

Post was one of the first reporters to file the story of Rudolf Hess parachuting into Scotland in May 1941. He likened Hess' arrival to "something out of a mystery thriller." Post was one of the eight reporters who trained with the United States Eighth Air Force in 1943 to fly along on B-24 and B-17 Flying Fortress bomber missions into Germany. After a week of high-altitude training Post flew his first mission on a B-24 Liberator on February 26, 1943. During the raid Post's aircraft encountered German fighter aircraft and was shot down over Oldenburg, Germany. Post and most of the crew did not survive the encounter.

== The Writing 69th ==
In February 1943 Post stunned two friends with the admission that he thought he was going to die. He had been selected to accompany bomber missions with the 8th U.S. Air Force and would soon be departing for Germany. Post's friends, actress Leonora Corbett and war correspondent Helen Millbank of the Chicago Daily News, tried to reassure him, but Post insisted he wasn't coming back.

At the time, Post had been trying to hitch a ride on a bomber for two years, first with the RAF and later with the U.S. Army Air Force. He and the other journalists trained with the Air Force for a week, learning relevant skills such as adjustment to high-altitude flying, parachuting and weapons use. After the training period the Writing 69th were assigned to their first mission.

=== Members ===
The seven members of the 69th and their affiliation besides Post:

- Homer Bigart: New York Herald Tribune
- Walter Cronkite: United Press
- Gladwin Hill: Associated Press
- Paul Manning: CBS Radio
- Andy Rooney: Stars and Stripes
- Denton Scott: Yank
- William Wade: International News Service

In addition to the writers of the 69th five newsreel cameramen took part in the training with the Writing 69th. They and their affiliations were:

- George B. Oswald: Universal Newsreel
- Ernest J.H. Wright: Paramount News
- J.L. Ransden: Movietone News
- Robert K.L. Gordon: Passe Gazette News
- Harold J. Morley: Gaumont British

== Death ==
Post belonged to the elite group of eight journalists participating in what was known as "The Flying Typewriters", "Legion of the Doomed", or "The Writing 69th". The first and last mission for the 69th would come on February 26, 1943. An American group of B-24s and B-17s were dispatched to take out the Focke-Wulf aircraft factory in Bremen, Germany. The skies over Bremen were overcast and the bombing run had to be diverted to a secondary target, the submarine pens at Wilhelmshaven.

Of the eight journalists who comprised the Legion of the Doomed, six went on that mission: Post, Cronkite, Rooney, Wade, Bigart, and Hill. Over Oldenburg, Germany, the group encountered German fighters. Post's B-24 was shot down and exploded in mid-air. Eight Air Force crew members were killed along with Post. The other planes returned safely, though the plane Rooney was on sustained some flak damage. Post's death effectively ended the days of reporters flying on bombing missions. Others, including Scott and Manning (who both missed the Wilhelmshaven raid), did fly after Post's mission, but it was not nearly as common after Post's death. Post is buried in the Ardennes American Cemetery at Neuville-en-Condroz, Belgium.

Upon hearing of Post's loss, an officer at the 44th Bomb Group wrote:

During the ten days he was here, Post won the confidence of all men and officers. They recognized his sincerity and his courage, for they constantly go through the same dangers themselves and they know the odds. He came at a time when the group had been badly shot up, when our losses had been heavy, when it seemed few people appreciated what they were suffering. Bob Post got close to our men. They poured out their story to him and felt his purpose was to help them win the war. It encouraged them to have the feeling that the people of the United States would be given a true picture of what they were trying to do and what must be done at home if democracy is to survive.

One of the two crew members who did survive the explosion, Second Lieutenant Wayne Gotke, later wrote about the experience after he was released from a German POW camp. The mission was unique because of the large number of firsthand accounts from the reporters. The German fighter pilot who shot down the bomber, Heinz Knoke, wrote about the incident in a book, I Flew for the Führer, after the war.
