= Betsy Wade =

American journalist and columnist (1929–2020)

- Born: Elizabeth Wade; July 28, 1929; New York City, U.S.
- Died: December 3, 2020 (aged 91); New York City, U.S.
- Education: Carleton College; Barnard College (B.A.); Columbia University (M.S.)
- Occupation(s): Columnist, journalist
- Years active: 1952 – 2001
- Employer: The New York Times
- Spouse: James Boylan (m. 1952)
- Children: 2

Elizabeth Wade Boylan (née Wade; July 18, 1929 – December 3, 2020), known professionally as Betsy Wade, was an American journalist and newspaper columnist who in 1956 became the first woman to edit news copy at The New York Times. In 1974, she was one of seven plaintiffs in a landmark successful class action lawsuit against the Times for gender discrimination. Wade was also the first woman to be chief editor on the foreign desk in 1972. Wade continued working for the Times until 2001.

== Early life and education ==
Wade was born on July 18, 1929, to Sidney and Elizabeth Manning Wade in Manhattan. She had one younger sister, Ellen. Sidney Wade was an executive at Union Carbide and her mother had inherited family money. Her mother struggled with mental illness throughout Wade's childhood. The family moved to suburban Bronxville, New York, in 1934. At her junior high school and at Bronxville High School, she was a staffer at the student newspaper. When she was fourteen her parents divorced. She attended Carleton College in Minnesota, transferring to Barnard College in New York and earned her bachelor's degree in 1951. She earned a master's degree in journalism from Columbia University in 1952 and was top of her class in copy editing.

== Career ==
Wade's career began at the New York Herald Tribune in the women's section in 1952. She was fired later that year when the paper learned she was pregnant. Wade worked for the Newspaper Enterprise Association for the next two years.

She joined The New York Times as a copy editor in 1956, becoming the first woman to edit news for the paper. She was briefly assigned to edit the women's page, but by 1958 had returned to editing news. She became the first woman editor on the foreign copy desk, and the first woman deputy chief of the foreign copy desk. In 1972, when she became the first woman chief of the foreign copy desk, a position nicknamed "the slot", the Times announced it in their house organ under a headline of "Betsy’s in the slot: first dame to make it".

Wade became active in the Newspaper Guild. She became a member of the union's International Executive Board, and in 1978 became the first woman president of the Guild's New York local. She was also a founding member of the Times' Women's Caucus, formed in 1972.

The Times' reporting on the Pentagon Papers, which Wade helped prepare for publishing, won the 1972 Pulitzer Prize for Public Service.

Wade and six other plaintiffs filed a 1974 lawsuit against the Times for its treatment of female employees. The suit demanded better pay and opportunities for female staffers, and was settled in the plaintiffs' favor.

In 1979, she became the first woman president of the New York Newspaper Guild. Wade told Nan Robertson in her 1992 book The Girls in the Balcony, "The copy desk did not put a screen around me. But they took the cuspidors out of the city room the first week. A copy boy got some deep ruffling and put it around my paste pot."

Wade became a weekly columnist, taking over the Times' The Practical Traveler column in 1987. A collection of her columns was published in book form as The New York Times Practical Traveler Handbook (1994).

After 45 years at the Times, Wade retired in 2001. After her retirement she taught classes in public policy and journalism at Hunter College.

== Awards and honors ==
The Times' publication of the Pentagon Papers, which Wade helped prepare, won a 1972 Pulitzer Prize for meritorious public service in journalism.

Wade won the Lifetime Achievement Award given by the Society of Silurians in 2016.

Journalism & Women Symposium created a fellowship for women journalists of color honoring her, the Betsy Wade Fund Fellowship.

== Personal life ==
She married James Boylan on December 27, 1952. Boylan, who taught at the Columbia University Graduate School of Journalism from 1957 to 1979, founded the Columbia Journalism Review in 1961. He later moved to the University of Massachusetts Amherst, where he is professor emeritus of journalism and history. She continued to write under the name Betsy Wade.

Wade and Boylan had two sons, six grandchildren and three great-grandchildren.

== Death ==
Wade was diagnosed with colon cancer in 2017, and died on December 3, 2020, at age 91, at her home in New York City. Manuscript collections relating to Wade are held at the Tamiment Library and Robert F. Wagner Archives, and by the State Historical Society of Missouri.

== Books ==
- (ed.) Forward Positions: The War Correspondence of Homer Bigart, by Homer Bigart. University of Arkansas Press, 1992. Introduction by Harrison E. Salisbury. ISBN 978-1-55728-257-6
- The New York Times Practical Traveler Handbook: An A-Z Guide to Getting There and Back. Times Books, 1994. ISBN 978-0812921892
