= Weapons of Mass Deception =

Weapons of Mass Deception is pejorative expression used by some people to describe U.S. President George W. Bush's claim that Saddam Hussein possessed weapons of mass destruction as justification for the war on Iraq.

The variation Weapons of Mass Distraction has also been used by pundits and satirists. This punning alteration accuses the Bush administration of using the war in Iraq to draw the nation's attention away from other problems, such as the economic recession of 2002. The meaning was later inverted to describe Bush's alleged attempts to divert attention away from the war following a drop in public support for the war.

== Book ==
Weapons of Mass Deception was used as the title of a nonfiction book by Sheldon Rampton and John Stauber. This book focused specifically on the PR tactics and techniques of the Bush administration after the September 11th terrorist attacks.

- Publisher: Tarcher (July 28, 2003)
- ISBN 978-1-58542-276-0

== Other media ==
Weapons of Mass Deception was also used as the title of a documentary produced by Danny Schechter which originally aired on HBO.

It is also the name of the fourth album by the British band Dissident Prophet.

Also, a popular NPR commentator Connie Rice read her Top Ten Weapons of Mass Distraction on The Tavis Smiley Show, July 14, 2004.

== See also ==
- Iraq and weapons of mass destruction

== Sources ==
- https://www.amazon.com/Weapons-Mass-Deception-Propaganda-Bushs/dp/1585422762
- http://www.utne.com/2003-06-01/WeaponsofMassDeception.aspx
- Top Ten Weapons of Mass Distraction
