= Jeff Clements =

American lawyer and writer

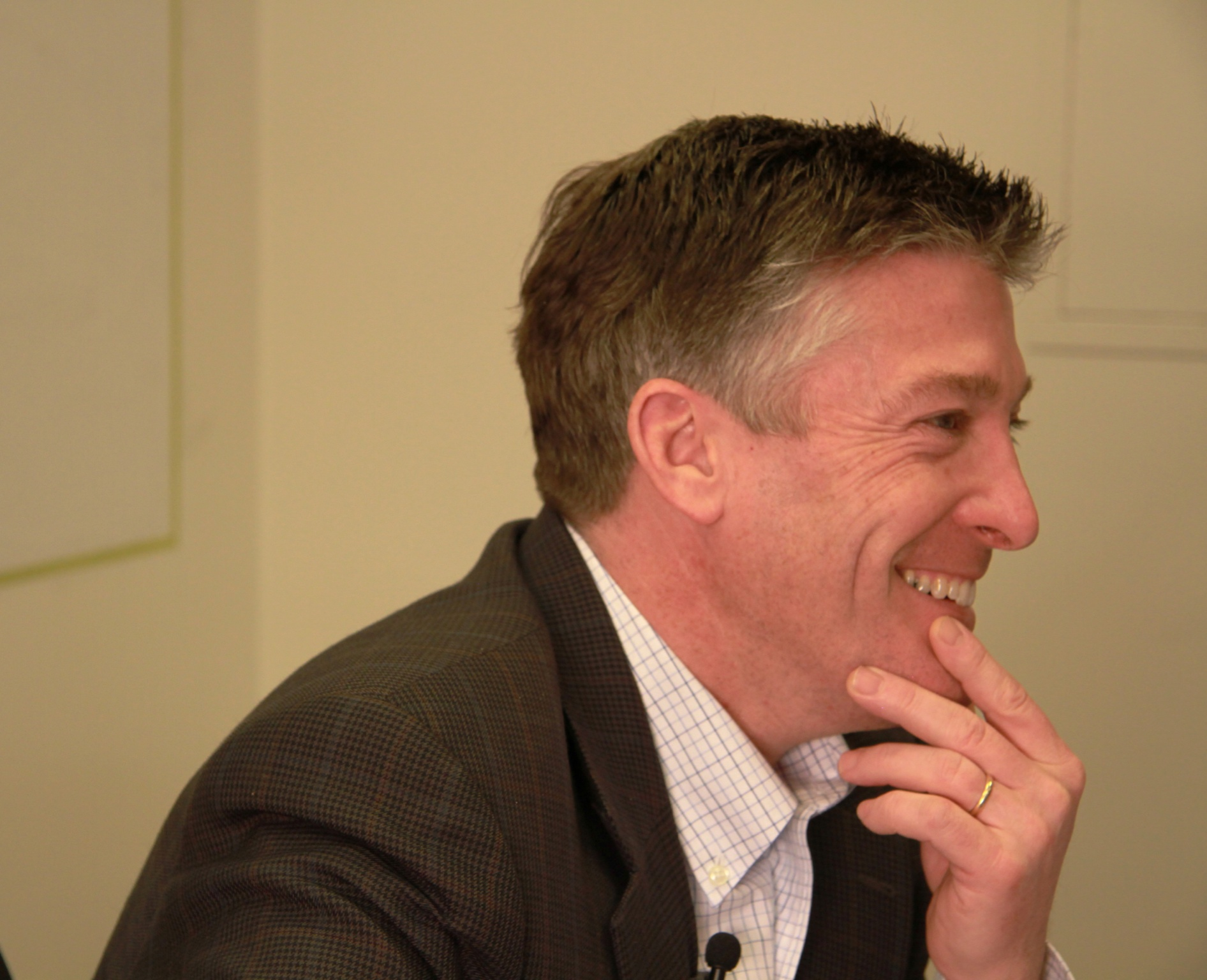
- Born: 1962 (age 63–64)
- Education: Colby College; Cornell Law School (JD)
- Occupation: CEO of American Promise

Jeff Clements (born 1962) is an American attorney, author, and the co-founder and CEO of American Promise. He is the author of Corporations Are Not People: Reclaiming Democracy From Big Money And Global Corporations. Since 2010, he has been one of the chief advocates for an amendment to the United States Constitution that would allow the states and U.S. Congress to decide whether and how to regulate campaign spending in elections.

== Early life and education ==
Clements majored in government at Colby College, graduating in 1984. He obtained his J.D. from Cornell Law School in 1988, graduating Magna Cum Laude.

== Legal career ==
Hired by Massachusetts Attorney General Scott Harshbarger in 1996, Clements served as Assistant Attorney General of Massachusetts from 1996 to 2000 where he worked on Investigations and enforcement of deceptive trade practices, antitrust, and consumer protection laws. Starting in 2006, Clements served as the Assistant Attorney General and Chief of the Public Protection Bureau in Massachusetts. In private practice, Jeff has been a partner at Mintz Levin in Boston, and in his own firm.

== Advocacy work ==
In 2009, as a private attorney, Clements represented several public interest organizations with a U.S. Supreme Court amicus brief in the Citizens United case. Clements argued: "[w]hether or not the Supreme Court's decision in Citizens United explicitly addresses 'corporate rights' under the Constitution, a holding that overrules Austin and McConnell would rest on the remarkable - and erroneous - assumption that the Constitution provides corporations with First Amendment and Fourteenth Amendment rights equivalent to those of people for purposes of political expenditures."

Following the U.S. Supreme Court ruling in Citizens United v. FEC, Clements and John Bonifaz founded Free Speech For People in 2010 to advocate for a 28th Amendment to overturn the Courts controversial 5–4 ruling. Clements departed Free Speech For People in 2016.

In 2012, Jeff co-founded Whaleback Partners LLC, provides accessible start-up funding for farmers and businesses engaged in local, sustainable agriculture.

In 2016, Clements founded American Promise to accelerate the movement for an amendment to the United States Constitution that would allow the states and U.S. Congress to decide whether and how to regulate campaign spending in elections.

== Public appearances ==
Clements is a frequent speaker on the national circuit. His commentary has appeared in the New York Times, the Financial Times, Newsweek, U.S. News & World Report, the Boston Globe, Salon, The Hill, Fox News, MSNBC, and many other outlets.
