= Lisa Graves =

American lawyer, progressive activist

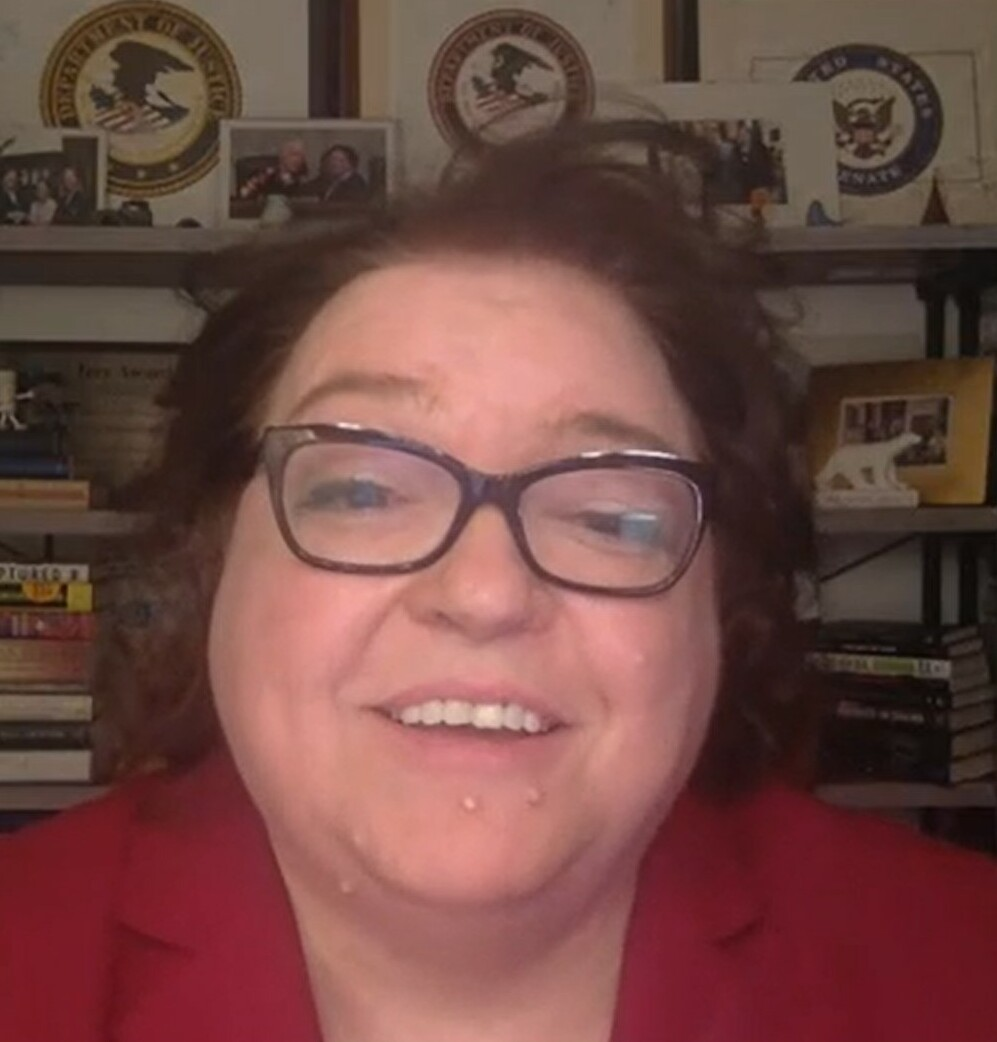
- Graves
- Education: Hastings College; University of Wisconsin, La Crosse (BA); Cornell University (JD)
- Occupations: Nonprofit executive, political activist
- Known for: Executive director of True North Research and former executive director of Center for Media and Democracy

Lisa Graves is a progressive activist who is the executive director of True North Research and president of the board of the Center for Media and Democracy (CMD). She served as executive director for CMD from 2009 to 2017, when she left to co-found Documented Investigations (now Documented.net). Graves also serves on the advisory board of U.S. Right to Know, and has previously advised UnKoch My Campus and the Bill of Rights Defense Fund.

== Career ==
Graves received her J.D. degree from Cornell Law School. She previously served as the Chief Counsel for Nominations on the United States Senate Judiciary Committee under Senator Patrick Leahy (D-Vermont) and as Deputy Assistant Attorney General in the United States Department of Justice during the Clinton Administration. Graves also worked as the Senior Legislative Strategist on national security issues for the American Civil Liberties Union, and as an adjunct law professor at the George Washington University Law School.

Graves joined the progressive watchdog group Center for Media and Democracy in 2009 as executive director. Graves has investigated and reported on the Koch Brothers, the American Legislative Exchange Council (ALEC), and the State Policy Network. In 2020, she published a report titled "The Billionaire Behind Efforts to Kill The U.S. Postal Service", which alleged that Charles Koch had been trying to privatize the U.S. Postal Service since the 1970s.

Graves has received awards from the Milwaukee Press Club, the Sidney Award, the Park Center for Independent Media, the Association for Education in Journalism and Mass Communication, and Cornell Law School.

In September 2025, Bold Type Books/Hachette published Graves' book, Without Precedent: How Chief Justice Roberts and His Accomplices Rewrote the Constitution and Dismantled Our Rights.
