= American Promise (organization) =

Campaign finance reform organization

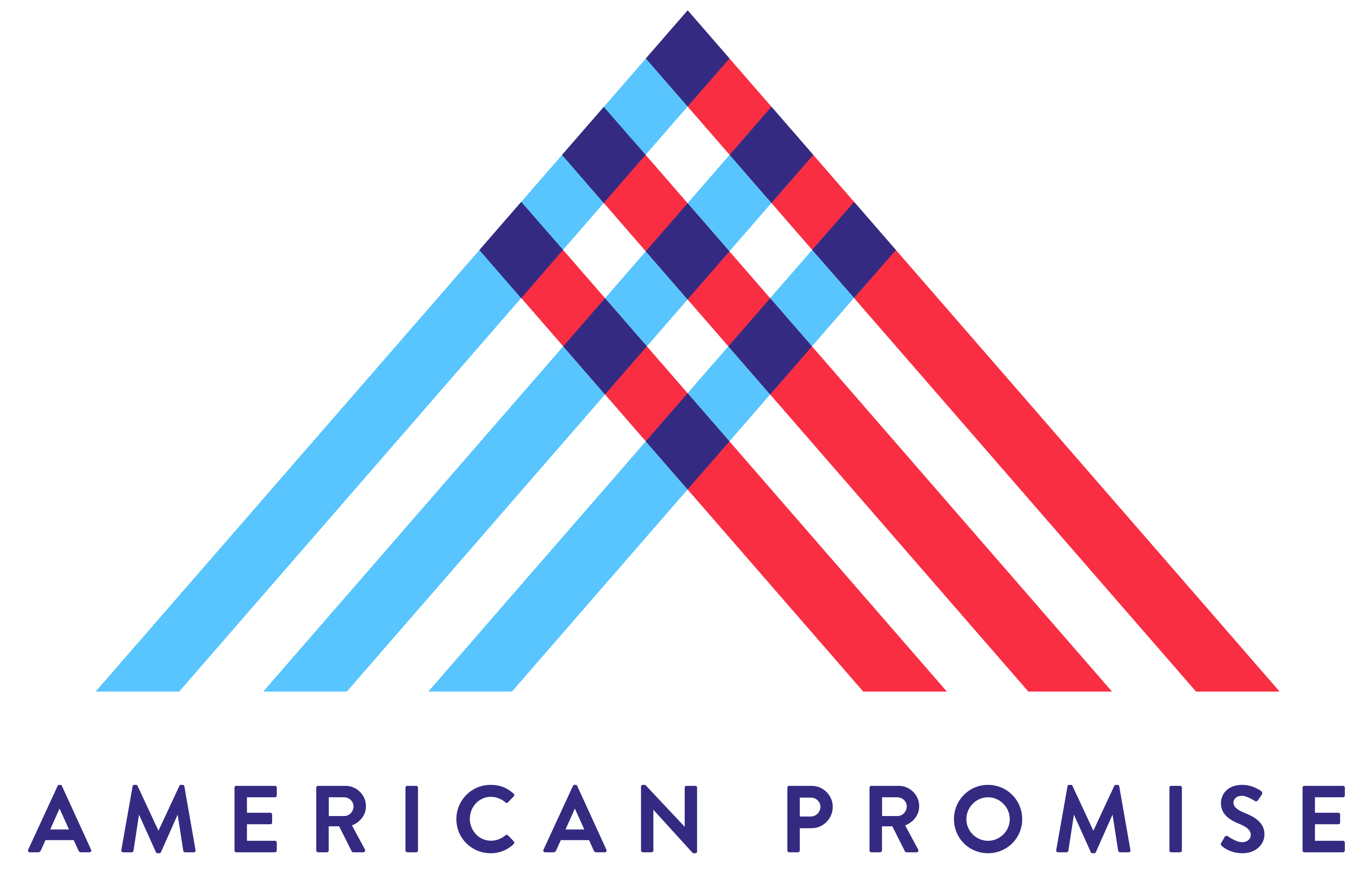
- Formation: 2016
- Founder: Jeff Clements
- Legal status: 501(c)3 and 501(c)4
- Headquarters: Concord, Massachusetts
- Staff: United States
- Website: American Promise

American Promise is a non-profit, non-partisan organization that, since its founding in 2016, has advocated for ratifying an amendment to the United States Constitution that would allow the states and U.S. Congress to decide whether and how to regulate campaign spending in elections.

For much of U.S. history, state and federal lawmakers had broad authority to set the rules for money in politics. Since the 1970s, that authority has been limited by a series of Supreme Court decisions, beginning with Buckley v. Valeo, that applied First Amendment protections to certain forms of campaign spending.

== The For Our Freedom Amendment ==
The For Our Freedom Amendment is the model amendment American Promise is working to advance. It was drafted following extensive public and legal consultations. If ratified, it would not impose any specific reforms; rather, it would constitutionally empower state and federal lawmakers to enact reasonable regulations around campaign fundraising and spending. Opinion polling from 2025 shows that 71% of Americans would support such an amendment, and favorability is consistent across all major political affiliations.

American Promise works through state-legislative advocacy, federal lobbying, grassroots organizing, digital mobilization, public education, and coalition building.

=== Amendment text ===
Section 1. We the People have compelling sovereign interests in the freedom of speech, representative self-government, federalism, the integrity of the electoral process, and the political equality of natural persons.

Section 2. Nothing in this Constitution shall be construed to forbid Congress or the States, within their respective jurisdictions, from reasonably regulating and limiting contributions and spending in campaigns, elections, or ballot measures.

Section 3. Congress and the States shall have the power to implement and enforce this article by appropriate legislation and may distinguish between natural persons and artificial entities, including by prohibiting artificial entities from raising and spending money in campaigns, elections, or ballot measures.

=== Progress to date ===
American Promise maintains an active presence on Capitol Hill to accelerate passage of the For Our Freedom Amendment, and devotes most of its resources to state-level campaigns, working with state advocates and legislators to pass resolutions in support of the amendment.

Twenty-five states have called on Congress to propose an amendment to the U.S. Constitution that returns the power to regulate election spending to the states: Alaska, California, Colorado, Connecticut, Delaware, Hawaii, Idaho, Illinois, Maine, Maryland, Massachusetts, Montana, Nevada, New Hampshire, New Jersey, New Mexico, New York, Oklahoma, Oregon, Rhode Island, Utah, Vermont, Virginia, Washington, and West Virginia. In 2026, Oklahoma and Idaho became the latest states to pass resolutions in support of the amendment.

Several more states are actively considering similar resolutions, and polling consistently shows that an amendment is popular with Americans across the board.

On June 4, 2026, with the support of American Promise, U.S. Rep. Tom Barrett, R-Mich., introduced House Joint Resolution 191, the Constitutional Campaign Finance Reform Amendment, which adopts, almost verbatim, the language of the For Our Freedom Amendment.

== Cross-Partisan Appeal ==
American Promise’s amendment solution has broad cross-partisan appeal. It does not impose any policy, and instead simply returns the ability to set the rules for money in politics to Americans and their elected leaders.

Americans are united in their concern about money in politics, and rank it as the top problem facing the country, and polling shows the amendment is supported by Democrats (76%), Republicans (72%) and Independents (74%).

In January 2026, Sutherland Institute, a think tank endorsed the American Promise amendment solution in its report, Freeing the States on Campaign Finance.

State legislators across parties support the amendment on a range of grounds from supporting federalism, to addressing the role of outside and dark money in state elections, and growing concerns about foreign-influenced money in elections.

== Key personnel and advisors ==
Jeff Clements serves as founder and chief executive officer, and Anastasia Khoo is the organization's president. John Wass, a corporate executive and entrepreneur, has served as chairman of the board of directors since 2016.
