= John Stauber =

American progressive writer

- Occupation: Writer

John Stauber is an American progressive writer. Stauber has co-authored five books about government propaganda, private interests and the public relations industry. His work includes one book about how industry manipulates science (Trust Us, We're Experts), one about the history and current scope of the public relations industry (Toxic Sludge is Good for You), and one about mad cow disease (Mad Cow USA), which predicted the surfacing of the disease within the United States.

In July 2003, Stauber and Sheldon Rampton wrote Weapons of Mass Deception: The Uses of Propaganda in Bush's War on Iraq, which argued that the Bush administration deceived the American public into supporting the war. In 2004, the two co-authored Banana Republicans, which argued that the Republican Party is turning the U.S. into a one-party state. The book argues that the far-right and its functionaries in the media, lobbying establishment and electoral system are undermining dissent and squelching pluralistic politics in the United States. In 2006 the two wrote The Best War Ever: Lies, Damned Lies, and the Mess in Iraq, which builds upon the arguments they posited in Weapons of Mass Deception.

Stauber is the founder and former executive director of the Center for Media and Democracy, which sponsors PR Watch and SourceWatch. Since the 1960s, he has worked with public interest, consumer, family farm, environmental and community organizations at the local, state and national level. He edits and writes for the Center's quarterly newsmagazine, PR Watch. He is also a member of the Liberty Tree Board of Advisers.

Stauber grew up in a conservative Republican household in Marshfield, Wisconsin, but the war in Vietnam turned him into an anti-war and environmental activist while still in high school.
