= The Writing 69th =

American journalists

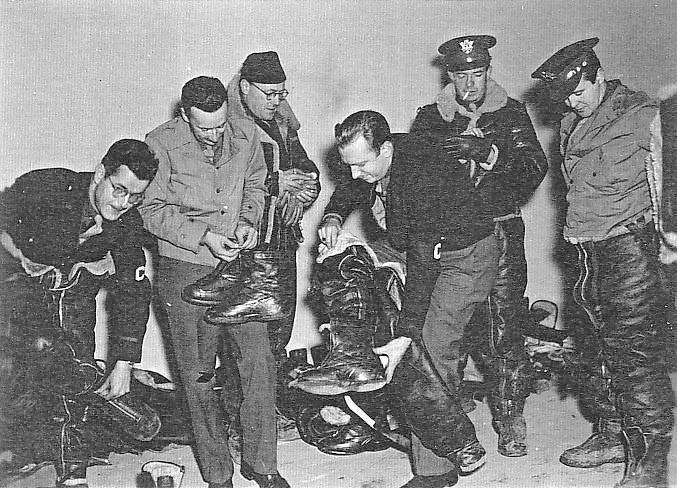
Writing 69th members (left to right) Gladwin Hill, William Wade, Robert Post, Walter Cronkite, Homer Bigart, and Paul Manning undergoing combat flight training for bombing missions in 1943

The Writing 69th was a group of eight American journalists who trained to fly bomber missions over Germany with the U.S. Eighth Air Force during World War II.

== The beginnings ==
The Writing 69th was so christened by one of the 8th Air Force's public relations officers, perhaps Hal Leyshon or Joe Maher. The group also considered the names "The Flying Typewriters" or the "Legion of the Doomed." The Writing 69th included Walter Cronkite, Andy Rooney, Homer Bigart, and Robert Post, among others.

== Members ==
The Writing 69th included:

- Paul Manning: correspondent for CBS Radio (did not fly on the first mission)
- Robert Post: correspondent for The New York Times (the only member of the group killed on the first mission)
- Walter Cronkite: correspondent for United Press
- Andy Rooney: correspondent for Stars and Stripes
- Denton Scott: correspondent for Yank, the Army Weekly (did not fly on the first mission)
- Homer Bigart: correspondent for the New York Herald Tribune
- William Wade: correspondent for the International News Service
- Gladwin Hill: correspondent for the Associated Press

In addition to the writers of the 69th, five newsreel cameramen took part in the training with the Flying Typewriters. They and their affiliations were:

- George B. Oswald: Universal Newsreel
- Ernest J.H. Wright: Paramount News
- J.L. Ransden: Movietone News
- Robert K.L. Gordon: Pathé Gazette News
- Harold J. Morley: Gaumont British

== The training ==
The reporters who accompanied the 8th Air Force were required to undergo a rigorous training course in just one week. They trained in a multitude of tasks, including how to shoot weapons, despite rules barring non-combatants from carrying a weapon into combat. The men were also trained on how to adjust to high altitudes, parachuting, and enemy identification.

== The first and last mission ==
The first and last mission for the Writing 69th would come on February 26, 1943. A group of American B-24s and B-17s were dispatched to attack the Focke-Wulf aircraft factory in Bremen, Germany. As fate would have it, the skies over Bremen were overcast, and the bombing run had to be diverted to a secondary target, the submarine pens at Wilhelmshaven.

Of the eight journalists who comprised the Writing 69th, only six went on that fateful mission; Post, Cronkite, Rooney, Wade, Bigart, and Hill. Over Oldenburg, Germany, the American bomber group encountered German fighters. Post's B-24 was shot down and exploded in mid-air. Eight Air Force crew members were killed, along with Post. The other aircraft returned safely, though Rooney's sustained some flak (anti-aircraft) damage. Post's death effectively ended the days of reporters flying on bombing missions. Others, including Scott and Manning (who both missed the Wilhelmshaven raid), did fly after this mission, but it was not nearly as widespread as it might have been had Post not been killed.

== Bibliography ==
- Hamilton, Jim (1999). The Writing 69th: Civilian war correspondents accompany a U.S. bombing raid on Germany during World War II. Green Harbor Publications. p. 172. ISBN 0971721106.
