= Trust Us, We're Experts =

2001 book by Sheldon Rampton and John Stauber

- Author: Sheldon Rampton; John Stauber
- Language: English
- Genre: Non-fiction
- Publisher: Jeremy P. Tarcher Inc.
- Publication date: 2001

Trust Us, We're Experts: How Industry Manipulates Science and Gambles with Your Future is a book written by Sheldon Rampton and John Stauber. It is published by Jeremy P. Tarcher Inc. of the Penguin Group. The book focuses on the role experts hired by public relations firms play in quieting public fear with inaccurate or incomplete information when dangerous toxins from industrial processes are released into the environment.

An April 2001 Village Voice review of the book says the book is "exhaustively detailed", "calmly convincing", and "light on rhetoric", warning readers that the book may induce "paranoid fatalism" about corporate manipulations.

== See also ==
- Mark Diesendorf
- Sheldon Krimsky
