= Homer Bigart =

American journalist (1907–1991)

Homer William Bigart
- Born: October 25, 1907; Hawley, Pennsylvania
- Died: April 16, 1991 (aged 83); Portsmouth, New Hampshire

Homer William Bigart (October 25, 1907 – April 16, 1991) was an American reporter who worked for the New York Herald Tribune from 1929 to 1955 and for The New York Times from 1955 to his retirement in 1972. He was considered a "reporter's reporter" and an "enduring role model." He won two Pulitzer Prizes as a war correspondent, as well as most of the other major journalism awards.

== Early life and education ==
Bigart was born in Hawley, Pennsylvania to Homer S. Bigart, a woolens manufacturer, and Anna Schardt Bigart. To author Karen Rothmeyer, he confided near the end of his life:

I decided that I would become an architect because it sounded so prestigious and so easy. Especially easy. I went to what was then Carnegie Tech in Pittsburgh and quickly discovered that if you were going to be an architect you at least had to learn how to draw. But I couldn't even do that. The only passing grade I got was in English, so I decided that about the only thing I could do was to become a newspaperman.

He transferred to the New York University School of Journalism in 1929.

== Journalism career ==
He got a part-time job as a night copy boy at the Herald Tribune, then dropped out of school to work full-time at the newspaper. He had a stutter and a painfully slow typing speed which did not stop him from being promoted to general assignment reporter after four years.

=== World War II ===
In 1942, with World War II raging, Bigart was asked to become a war correspondent. He stated that, although he never liked the war, when he was assigned to London:

[T]hose first few months were about the happiest ones I think I've ever spent in journalism. I liked the people and I liked the city. There was sort of a lull in the air raid war so you had the excitement of being in a war area without any real danger.

He and seven other reporters flew bombing missions over Germany as part of "The Writing 69th". On one such mission to Wilhelmshaven in March 1943, the B-17 bomber formation in which he and fellow reporters Walter Cronkite and Gladwin Hill were flying suffered heavy losses to enemy fighters. He also covered the fighting in North Africa, Italy, and southern France. When Germany surrendered, he went to the Pacific and was one of the first reporters to enter Hiroshima after the atomic bombing. For the latter work, he won the Pulitzer Prize for Telegraphic Reporting - International (a predecessor of the International Reporting Pulitzer), citing "his distinguished reporting during the year 1945 from the Pacific war theatre."

Secretary of War Robert P. Patterson honored war correspondents, including Bigart, at an event in Washington, on November 23, 1946.

This was only the first of several wars Bigart was to cover.

=== Korean War ===
Next up was the Korean War where he clashed with fellow Herald Tribune reporter Marguerite Higgins. Recalled Bigart:

When I came out I thought I was the premier war correspondent and I thought that she, being the Tokyo correspondent, ought to be back in Tokyo. But she didn't see things that way. She was a very brave person, foolishly brave. As a result, I felt as though I had to go out and get shot at occasionally myself. So I resented that.

Nonetheless, Bigart, Higgins and four others—two from the Chicago Daily News and two from the Associated Press—shared the 1951 Pulitzer Prize for International Reporting. Once again, he was in the thick of things; a July 10, 1950, dispatch described being caught between North Korean tanks and an American artillery barrage. Newsweek called him "the best war correspondent of an embattled generation."

He left the Herald Tribune in 1955, a decade before its demise, for The New York Times. He covered the trial of Nazi Adolf Eichmann in 1961.

=== Vietnam War ===
In 1962, Bigart was sent to South Vietnam, where he stayed for six months. He soon realized that the war was a mistake, stating "I never thought we'd be stupid enough to send ground troops over there in the first place, after the experience in Korea".

=== Civil rights movement ===
The New York Times dispatched Bigart to cover some of the most significant events of the struggle of Southern blacks for civil rights. He followed the 101st Airborne Division into Little Rock, Arkansas, in 1957, in response to Governor Orval Faubus's refusal to comply with federal court orders to desegregate the city's public schools. He covered the demonstrations in St. Augustine, Florida, that led directly to the passage of the landmark Civil Rights Act of 1964. His dispatch's blunt description of civil rights opponents in Philadelphia, Mississippi, as "peckerwoods' and "rednecks," following the disappearance of civil rights activists Mickey Schwerner, James Cheney, and Andrew Goodman, set Bigart apart from other Times reporters.

== Personal life ==
He divorced his first wife, Alice Veit.

Alice Weel, his second wife, died of cancer in 1969. Alice Weel Bigart was the first woman to write full-time for a US network news program, when she joined CBS's Douglas Edwards and the News in 1948 and later became a producer of 60 Minutes. Hélène Montgomery-Moore, the widow of Major Cecil Montgomery-Moore, DFC, funded the Mrs. Cecil Montgomery-Moore Scholarship for journalism, in memory of Alice Weel Bigart.

Bigart retired in 1973 and died in 1991 in Portsmouth, New Hampshire, of cancer. He was survived by his third wife, Else Holmelund Minarik, a writer of children's books.

== Books ==
- Forward Positions: The war correspondence of Homer Bigart, ed. Betsy Wade (University of Arkansas Press, 1992); ISBN 1557282579
