= William Wade (journalist) =

American journalist (1918–2006)

William Warren Wade (1918 in Manhattan, New York – March 24, 2006 in Oakland, California) was an American war correspondent during World War II. He was a member of an eight-man team of journalists who flew bombing missions over Germany with the United States Army Air Forces (USAAF) while he was working for the International News Service.

== Early life ==
Wade was born in Manhattan, son of a printer. At an early age he took an interest in the news. He took a newspaper delivery job as a young boy and by the time he was 16 he wrote unpaid articles for the Bergen County, New Jersey newspaper covering sports. He attended journalism school at the University of Minnesota. He worked as the copy desk chief at the Minnesota Daily from 1936-1939. After Wade graduated from college in 1939, he went to work for the Hearst News Service in New York and later in Chicago. In 1941 he landed a job at the International News Service (INS) in London and was immediately assigned to Iceland for nine months.

== The Writing 69th ==
Wade, along with seven other reporters, trained with and planned on flying bombing missions with the Eighth Air Force. That, however, was not necessarily in the cards. The Writing 69th trained with the Air Force for a week before the first mission, learning skills such as parachuting, adjustment to high-altitudes and weapons. The day of the first mission Feb. 26, 1943 was overcast over the primary target, thus the bombing group, composed of Consolidated B-24 Liberators and Boeing B-17 Flying Fortresses diverted to a secondary target. It was no matter to Wade. He never saw either target.

Each of the six journalists (two reporters didn't fly that day) who flew the mission that day were on different planes. Wade's plane developed engine trouble and had to turn back. He later filed a story with his college-town Minnesota newspaper headlined "This local boy didn't make good." Later Wade missed a chance to fly a mission with the Royal Air Force when he lost a coin toss with fellow INS reporter Lowell Bennett. Bennett's plane was shot down and he was held prisoner in a German POW camp for 18 months. Eventually, Wade would fly a mission on D-Day on a Martin B-26 Marauder.

The Writing 69th never got a chance to fulfill their destiny as flying war correspondents. On the first mission New York Times correspondent Robert Post was killed in action when the plane he was on was shot down over Germany. The tragedy effectively ended the days of The Writing 69th.

== After the war ==
After the war ended Wade went on to earn a degree from the London School of Economics. He worked as an editor, writer and on-air talent for Voice of America beginning in 1955. In 1963 he became Voice of America's European bureau chief in Munich. He later worked for a decade as the chief for Voice of America's West European bureau in London. During this time he covered a lot of world financial and economic news and later wrote a book on the topic. Wade retired from Voice of America in 1984 and in 1994 moved to Oakland, California to be closer to his family.

Wade was married to Margaret Wade for 58 years before she died in October 2005. He had two daughters, Margaret and Christine.
