= Gladwin Hill =

American journalist

Gladwin Hill (June 16, 1914, in Boston – September 19, 1992, in Los Angeles) was an American journalist who was a member of the Writing 69th, a group of reporters who trained and flew on bombing missions with the Eighth Air Force during World War II.

== Education ==
Hill was an alumnus of Harvard University.

== Writing 69th group ==
As a member of the group of reporters who were known alternatively, as either the Writing 69th, the Legion of the Doomed, or the Flying Typewriters, Hill trained with the United States Eighth Air Force. The training covered important topics such as high altitude adjustment, weapons, and parachuting. Hill worked for the Associated Press from 1936 to 1944 and was the AP correspondent assigned to the bomber missions.

Hill flew his first and last bomber mission on February 26, 1943. On that day, one of the planes was carrying reporter Robert Post. That plane was shot down and Post and eight Air Force personnel were killed. Hill described his participation in the mission in his article the next day: "It was thrilling. Yet at the same time it was strangely prosaic in the business-like efficiency with which it was executed."

== After World War II ==
After World War II ended, Hill went to work for the New York Times in their Los Angeles bureau. Hill worked there from 1946 to 1968.

On November 22, 1963, Hill was dispatched to Dallas by the Times in order to cover the events unfolding after the assassination of President John F. Kennedy. He voluntarily offered the FBI an interview about what he knew regarding the shooting of Lee Harvey Oswald by Jack Ruby, which occurred while he was covering the transfer of Oswald into the police building. The interview basically determined when Hill heard the shot and that "immediately realizing what was happening he ran out of the police building through another exit to take up a position by the van".

Hill also wrote books on environmental issues and politics. Madman In a Lifeboat: Issues of the Environmental Crisis (1973) provided imagery that persisted for decades regarding possible social dynamics during such a crisis.

== Nuclear test exposure ==
Hill observed several nuclear explosion tests conducted at the Nevada Test Site. On November 1, 1951, unable to get official clearance to attend the Operation Buster-Jangle Dog nuclear test, Hill was on Mount Charleston, a large mountain northwest of Las Vegas, in order to view the explosion that would occur approximately 60 miles to the north of the mountain.

After the explosion, Hill and the other assembled reporters realized the highly radioactive mushroom cloud was moving south at a high speed, in their direction. Hill decided to descend the mountain and began driving down the twisting mountain road, but was unable to escape from the area before the cloud arrived. He wrote later about the experience. Realizing that the cloud was directly over him, "emphasizing its presence with a blast of static on my car radio", Hill stopped and stepped out of the car to observe the passing of the cloud.

Later, in Indian Springs, an acquaintance with a Geiger counter measured more than 20 milliroentgens per hour on some parts of his car.

== Death ==
Hill died from lung cancer in 1992 at the age of 78.

== Books ==
- Dancing Bear: An Inside Look at California Politics (1968)
- The Politics of Air Pollution: Public Interest and Pressure Groups (1968)
- Madman In a Lifeboat: Issues of the Environmental Crisis (1973)

== See also ==
Radiation exposure orders of magnitude
