= Sheldon Rampton =

American editor and author (born 1957)

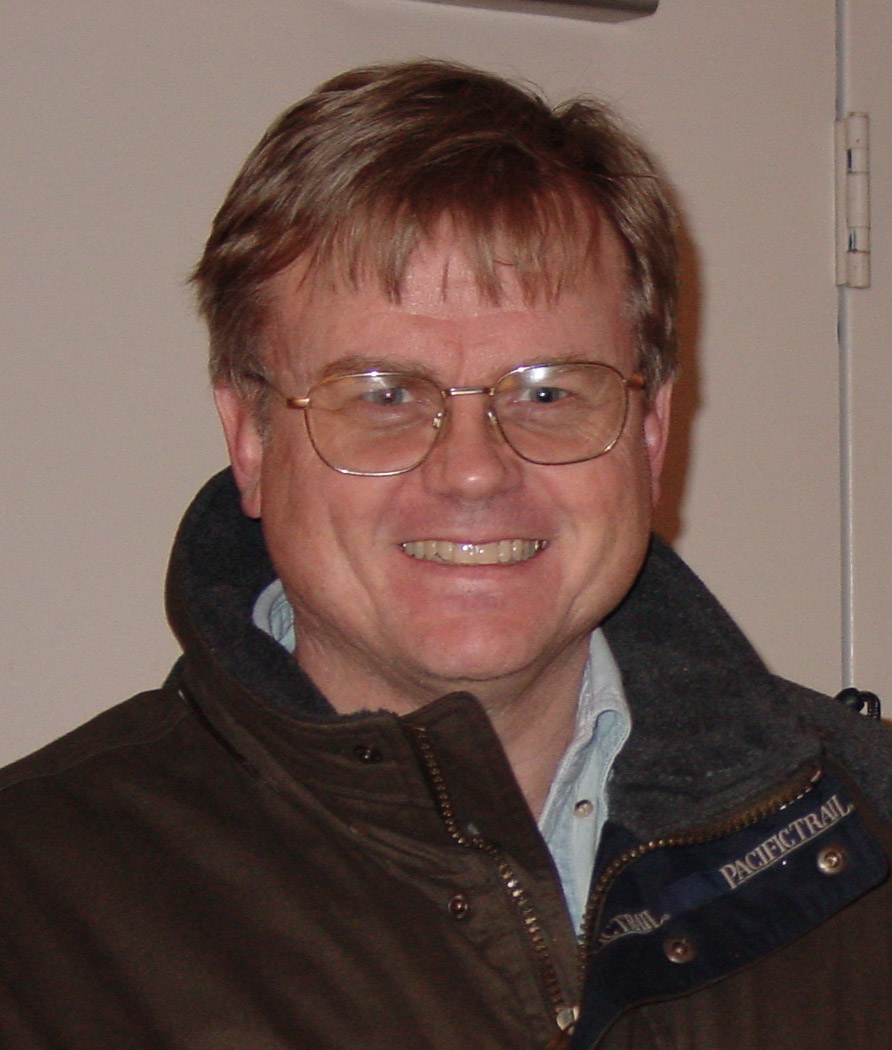
- Occupations: Editor, author

Sheldon Rampton is an American editor and author. He was editor of PR Watch and co-authored with John Stauber several books that strongly criticize the public relations industry.

== Career ==
In 1995, Rampton teamed with John Stauber as co-editors of PR Watch, a publication of the Center for Media and Democracy (CMD). They were described as liberal, and their writings are regarded by some members of the public relations industry as one-sided and hostile, but their work drew wide attention. ActivistCash, a website hosted by Washington lobbyist Richard Berman, has castigated them as "self-anointed watchdogs," "scare-mongers," "reckless," and "left-leaning." Rampton and Stauber have, in turn, argued that the ActivistCash critique contains several "demonstrably false" claims. According to a review in The Denver Post, their 1995 book, Toxic Sludge Is Good for You, offered "a sardonic, wide-ranging look at the public relations industry."

After leaving the Center for Media and Democracy in 2009, Rampton became a website developer, joining an open government initiative led by New York State Senate chief information officer Andrew Hoppin. In 2010, Hoppin and Rampton co-founded NuCivic, an open source software company, which they sold in December 2014 to GovDelivery, a software services company now known as Granicus. Rampton currently works as a software engineer at Granicus. He also serves on the board of directors of Global Energy Monitor (GEM), a non-governmental organization that catalogs fossil fuel and renewable energy projects worldwide in support of clean energy.

== Writings by Rampton ==
- With Liz Chilsen:
  - Friends In Deed: The Story of US-Nicaragua Sister Cities (1987)
- With John Stauber:
  - Toxic Sludge Is Good For You: Lies, Damn Lies and the Public Relations Industry (1995)
  - Mad Cow U.S.A.: Could the Nightmare Happen Here? (1997)
  - Trust Us, We're Experts: How Industry Manipulates Science and Gambles With Your Future (2001)
  - Weapons of Mass Deception: The Uses of Propaganda in Bush's War on Iraq (2003)
  - Banana Republicans (2004)
  - The Best War Ever: Lies, Damned Lies, and the Mess in Iraq (2006)
