= Orwell Award =

American non-fiction literary award

The NCTE George Orwell Award for Distinguished Contribution to Honesty and Clarity in Public Language (the Orwell Award for short) is an award given since 1975 by the Public Language Award Committee of the National Council of Teachers of English. It is awarded annually to "writers who have made outstanding contributions to the critical analysis of public discourse."

Noam Chomsky, Donald Barlett, and James B. Steele are the only recipients to have won twice.

Its negative counterpart, awarded by the same body, is the Doublespeak Award, "an ironic tribute to public speakers who have perpetuated language that is grossly deceptive, evasive, euphemistic, confusing, or self-centered."

== Winners ==
=== 1970s ===
- 1975: David Wise for The Politics of Lying
- 1976: Hugh Rank for the "Intensify/Downplay" schema for analyzing communication, persuasion, and propaganda
- 1977: Walter Pincus, reporter for The Washington Post—"A patient, methodical journalist who knew his job and who knew the jargon of Washington. Mr. Pincus was the man responsible for bringing to public attention, and thus to a debate in the Senate, the appropriations funding for the neutron bomb."—Hugh Rank, chair, NCTE Committee on Public Doublespeak
- 1978: Sissela Bok for Lying: Moral Choice in Public and Private Life
- 1979: Erving Goffman for Gender Advertisements

=== 1980s ===
- 1980: Sheila Harty for Hucksters in the Classroom: A Review of Industry Propaganda in Schools
- 1981: Dwight Bolinger for Language—The Loaded Weapon
- 1982: Stephen Hilgartner, Richard C. Bell, and Rory O'Connor for Nukespeak: Nuclear Language, Visions and Mindset
- 1983: Haig Bosmajian for The Language of Oppression
- 1984: Ted Koppel, moderator of Nightline—"...a model of intelligence, informed interest, social awareness, verbal fluency, fair and rigorous questioning of controversial figures... [who has sought] honesty and openness, clarity and coherence, to raise the level of public discourse."—William Lutz, chair, NCTE Committee on Public Doublespeak
- 1985: Torben Vestergaard and Kim Schroder for The Language of Advertising
- 1986: Neil Postman for Amusing Ourselves to Death: Public Discourse in the Age of Show Business
- 1987: Noam Chomsky for On Power and Ideology: The Managua Lectures
- 1988: Donald Barlett and James B. Steele for a series of articles in The Philadelphia Inquirer on the Tax Reform Act of 1986, in which they pointed out language disguising tax loopholes in the legislation
- 1989: Edward S. Herman and Noam Chomsky for Manufacturing Consent: The Political Economy of the Mass Media

=== 1990s ===
- 1990: Charlotte Baecher of the Consumers Union for Selling America's Kids: Commercial Pressures on Kids of the 90s
- 1991: David Aaron Kessler—"Under the leadership of Commissioner Kessler, the FDA has begun seizing products with misleading labels, developing new guidelines for clarity and accuracy in food labels, and exposing false, misleading, and deceptive health claims on food labels and in food advertising."—William Lutz
- 1992: Donald Barlett and James Steele of The Philadelphia Inquirer for the series America: What Went Wrong?
- 1993: Eric Alterman for the book Sound and Fury: The Washington Punditocracy and the Collapse of American Politics
- 1994: Garry Trudeau, creator of the cartoon strip Doonesbury, was cited for consistently attacking doublespeak in all aspects of American life and from all parts of the cultural and political spectrum.
- 1995: Lies of Our Times was published between January 1990 and December 1994. It served not only as a general media critic but as a watchdog of The New York Times, which the magazine referred to as "the most cited news medium in the U.S., our paper of record."
- 1996: William D. Lutz for The New Doublespeak: Why No One Knows What Anyone's Saying Anymore
- 1997: Gertrude Himmelfarb for "Professor Narcissus: In Today's Academy, Everything Is Personal" in The Weekly Standard
- 1998: Two winners
  - Juliet Schor for The Overspent American: Upscaling, Downshifting, and the New Consumer
  - Scott Adams for his role in "Mission Impertinent" (San Jose Mercury News West Magazine, November 16, 1997), which highlighted the absurdity of managerial language and the overuse of the "mission statement."
- 1999: Norman Solomon for The Habits of Highly Deceptive Media: Decoding Spin and Lies in the Mainstream News (Common Courage Press)

=== 2000s ===
- 2000: Alfie Kohn for The Schools Our Children Deserve
- 2001: Sheldon Rampton and John Stauber for Trust Us, We're Experts!: How Industry Manipulates Science and Gambles with Your Future
- 2002: Bill Press for the book Spin This!
- 2003: Susan Ohanian for the website susanohanian.org
- 2004: Investigative journalist Seymour Hersh and writer Arundhati Roy
- 2005: Jon Stewart and the cast of The Daily Show
- 2006: Steven H. Miles, M.D, author of Oath Betrayed: Torture, Medical Complicity, and the War on Terror
- 2007: Ted Gup, author of Nation of Secrets: The Threat to Democracy and the American Way of Life
- 2008: Charlie Savage, author of Takeover: The Return of the Imperial Presidency and the Subversion of American Democracy
- 2009: Amy Goodman, co-founder, executive producer, and host of Democracy Now!

=== 2010s ===
- 2010: Michael Pollan, author of Food Rules and co-narrator of Food, Inc.
- 2011: F.S. Michaels, author of Monoculture: How One Story Is Changing Everything
- 2012: Peter Zuckerman and Amanda Padoan, authors of Buried in the Sky
- 2013: Paul L. Thomas whose publications include Ignoring Poverty in the U.S.: The Corporate Takeover of Public Education (2012) and Challenging Genres: Comic Books and Graphic Novels (2010). Dr. Thomas has also edited a recently published volume titled Becoming and Being a Teacher: Confronting Traditional Norms to Create New Democratic Realities (2013).
- 2014 The Onion for its satire and "treatment of dramatically sensitive issues that plague our culture", in particular U.S. gun culture.
- 2015: Anthony Cody for The Educator and the Oligarch
- 2016: David Greenberg for Republic of Spin: An Inside History of the American Presidency
- 2017: Richard Sobel for Citizenship as Foundation of Rights: Meaning for America
- 2018: Katie Watson for Scarlet A
- 2019: Michael P. Lynch for Know-It-All-Society: Truth and Arrogance in Political Culture

=== 2020s ===
- 2020: Dr. April Baker-Bell, author of Linguistic Justice: Black Language, Literacy, Identity, and Pedagogy
- 2021: Kristin Kobes Du Mez for Jesus and John Wayne: How White Evangelicals Corrupted a Faith and Fractured a Nation
- 2022: David Chrisinger for Public Policy Writing That Matters
- 2023: Kisha Porcher and Shamaine Bertrand for the Black Gaze podcast
- 2024: Jessica Lander for Making Americans: Stories of Historic Struggles, New Ideas, and Inspiration in Immigrant Education
- 2025: Sarah Stitzlein for Teaching Honesty in a Populist Era: Emphasizing Truth in the Education of Citizens

== See also ==
- Orwell Prize – British prize for political writing
- Big Brother Awards
- Doublespeak Award
