= Rory O'Connor =

Rory O'Connor may refer to:

- Ruaidrí Ua Conchobair (1116–1198), king of Connacht and High King of Ireland
- Rory O'Connor (Irish republican) (1883–1922), Irish republican who fought in the Irish War of Independence and the Irish Civil War
- Rory O'Connor (filmmaker) (active from 1985), American journalist, author and filmmaker
- Rory O'Connor (hurler) (born 1998), Irish hurler
- Rory O'Connor (rugby union, born 1994), Australian rugby union player
- Rory O'Connor (rugby union, born 1932) (1932–1986), Welsh rugby union player
