= Creative writing =

Academic discipline concerned with creating literature

Creative writing is any writing that goes beyond the boundaries of normal professional, journalistic, academic, or technical forms of literature, typically identified by an emphasis on craft and technique, such as narrative structure, character development, literary tropes, genre, and poetics. Both fictional and non-fictional works fall into this category, including such forms as novels, biographies, short stories, poems, and even some forms of journalism. Writing for the screen and stage—screenwriting and playwriting—are often taught separately, but fit under the creative writing category as well.

== Definition ==
Creative writing can technically be considered any writing of original composition. In this sense, creative writing is a more contemporary and process-oriented name for what has been traditionally called literature, including the variety of its genres. In her work, Foundations of Creativity, Mary Lee Marksberry references Paul Witty and Lou LaBrant's Teaching the People's Language to define creative writing. Marksberry notes:

Witty and LaBrant...[say creative writing] is a composition of any type of writing at any time primarily in the service of such needs as

1. the need for keeping records of significant experience,
2. the need for sharing experience with an interested group, and
3. the need for free individual expression which contributes to mental and physical health.

== In academia ==
Unlike academic writing classes that teach students to write based on the rules of language, creative writing focuses on students' self-expression. Creative writing is taught at various educational levels, including primary and secondary school(K–12), as well as in higher education. The most refined teaching of creative writing is in universities. Following a reworking of university education in the post-war era, creative writing courses have gained increasing prominence in universities. In the UK, the first formal creative writing program was established as a Master of Arts degree at the University of East Anglia in 1970 by the novelists Malcolm Bradbury and Angus Wilson. With the beginning of formal creative writing programs:

For the first time in the sad and enchanting history of literature, for the first time in the glorious and dreadful history of the world, the writer was welcome in the academic place. If the mind could be honored there, why not the imagination?

=== Programs of study ===
Creative writing programs are typically available to writers from the high school level all the way through graduate school/university and adult education. These programs are traditionally housed in English departments, but creative writing programs have increasingly spun off into their own departments. Creative writing undergraduate degrees tend to be Bachelor of Arts (BA) or Bachelor of Fine Arts (BFA) degrees, but Bachelor of Science (BSc) degrees also exist. Postgraduate courses include Master of Arts, Master of Fine Arts, or Master of Studies. Ph.D. programs are also becoming more prevalent in the field, as more writers attempt to bridge the gap between academic study and artistic pursuit.

Creative writers often place an emphasis on either fiction or poetry, and often starting with short stories or poems. Students then make a schedule based on this emphasis, including reading assignments, regular writing tasks, and workshops to strengthen their skills, knowledge and techniques. Screenwriting and playwriting courses may be housed in film and theatre departments as well as creative writing departments. Creative writing students are encouraged to get involved in extracurricular writing-based activities, such as publishing clubs, school literary magazines or newspapers, writing contests, writing colonies or conventions, and extended education classes.

== In the classroom ==
Creative writing is usually taught in a workshop format, where students submit original work for peer critique. Students also develop a writing process through the practice of writing and re-writing. Courses also teach the means to exploit or access latent creativity, and may teach more technical issues such as editing, narrative structure, literary techniques, genres, idea generation, or overcoming writer's block. Writers such as Michael Chabon, Kazuo Ishiguro, Kevin Brockmeier, Ian McEwan, Karl Kirchwey, Rose Tremain, David Benioff, Darren Star and Peter Farrelly have graduated from university creative writing programs.

Many educators find that using creative writing can increase students' academic performance and psychological resilience. The activity of completing small goals consistently—rather than having unfinished big goals—engenders pride, which releases dopamine and increases motivation. Students build resilience by documenting and analyzing their experiences, providing new perspectives on old situations and providing a means to sort emotions. It also increases a student's level of compassion and creates a sense of community among students in what could otherwise be deemed an isolating classroom.

=== International students ===
Creative writing may have an influence not only on native-speaking students but also on international students. Educators who advocate for creative writing say incorporating creative writing classes or exercises has the potential to develop students into better readers, analysts, and writers. These same people say creative writing can have similar effects on international students by acting as a platform for them to share their own heritage, experiences, and values. Scholar Youngjoo Yi conducted a case study that tested this idea over two years. Yi focused on an international student from Korea and examined how her creative writing class influenced her in-school and out-of-school writing. He concluded that taking the creative writing class made her a more confident writer—not only in English but also in other languages—and the projects done in her creative writing class encouraged her to express and connect her Korean heritage with her English writing.

=== Composition studies ===
Argument and research writing is a major focus in the field of composition studies. The focus on academic writing tends to leave little room for creative writing in writing studies. Gregory Stephens suggests that focusing heavily on academic writing prevents students from developing their own unique writing style and voice. When he applied creative writing pedagogy techniques to STEM students at the University of Puerto Rico-Mayaguez, he found exercises such as "self-characterization" and storytelling assignments helped his STEM students develop empathy, self-awareness, and a narrative voice. He suggests these skills are transferable to real-world situations such as professional settings. By engaging in creative writing exercises, students are able to break free from the "constraints of formal thinking and writing" of academic writing, potentially boosting students’ confidence, creativity, and overall writing skills.

=== In academia ===
Creative writing is considered by some academics (mostly in the US) to be an extension of English studies, although it is taught around the world in many languages. Some academics see creative writing as a challenge to the tradition in English studies of dealing with the critical study of literary forms, not the creation of literary forms. In the United Kingdom and Australia, as well as increasingly in the US and the rest of the world, creative writing is considered a discipline in its own right, not an offshoot of any other discipline.

To say that the creative has no part in education is to argue that a university is not universal.

Those who support creative writing programs—either as part of or separate from the study of English—argue for the academic worth of the experience. They suggest creative writing hones the students' abilities to clearly express their thoughts and entails an in-depth study of literary terms and mechanisms that can improve the writers' work. The planning, development, critical analysis and creative problem-solving skills are further used in other areas beyond creative writing.

Some people suggest that creative writing cannot be taught. In an article for the New Yorker, essayist Louis Menand quotes Kay Boyle, the director of the creative writing program at San Francisco State University for sixteen years, who said, "all creative-writing programs ought to be abolished by law". The pedagogy of creative writing is also a source of debate. Critics of MFA and English graduate programs say the methods of instruction discriminate against people with disabilities, emphasizing writing practices such as daily writing requirements or location-based writing that students with chronic illnesses, physical or mental health barriers, and neurodivergency are unable to access. The selection of texts used in traditional creative writing programs has also been criticized, with scholars such as Caleb González saying that the Western literary canon and writing pedagogy are "historically rooted and linked to exclusion and structural racism in creative writing programs".

== In prisons ==
In the late 1960s, American prisons began implementing creative writing programs due to the prisoner rights movement that stemmed from events such as the Attica Prison riot. These creative writing programs, like other art programs, aim to provide education, structure, and a creative outlet to encourage rehabilitation of prisoners. These programs' continuation relies heavily on volunteers and outside financial support from sources such as authors and activist groups.

The Poets Playwrights Essayists Editors and Novelists, known as PEN, were among the most significant contributors to creative writing programs in America. In 1971, PEN established the Prison Writing Committee to implement and advocate for creative writing programs in prisons throughout the U.S. The PEN Writing Committee improved prison libraries, inspired volunteer writers to teach prisoners, persuaded authors to host workshops, and founded an annual literary competition for prisoners. Workshops and classes help prisoners build self-esteem, make healthy social connections, and learn new skills, which can ease prisoner reentry (reoffending).

Creative writing programs offered in juvenile correction facilities have also proved beneficial. In Alabama, Writing Our Stories began in 1997 as an anti-violence initiative to encourage positive self-expression among incarcerated youths. The program found that participants gained confidence, the ability to empathize and see their peers in a more positive light, and the motivation to want to return to society and live a more productive life.

One California study of prison fine arts programs found that art education increased emotional control and decreased disciplinary reports. Participation in creative writing and other art programs results in significant positive outcomes for the inmates' mental health, their relationships with their families, and the facility's environment. The study found that improved writing skills enhanced participants' abilities in other academic areas of study. Teaching prisoners creative writing can encourage literacy, teach necessary life skills, and provide prisoners with an outlet to express regret, accountability, responsibility, and a kind of restorative justice.

== Elements ==
- Action
- Character
- Conflict
- Dialogue
- Genre
- Narration
- Pace
- Plot
- Point of view
- Scene
- Setting
- Style
- Suspense
- Theme and motif
- Tone
- Voice

== Forms and genres of literature ==
- Autobiography/Memoir
- Creative nonfiction
- Children's books
- Drama
- Epic
- Flash fiction
- Graphic novels/Comics
- Novel
- Novella
- Play
- Poetry
- Screenplay
- Short story
- Dialogues
- Blogs

== See also ==
- Asemic writing
- Author
- Book report
- Clarion Workshop
- Collaborative writing
- Creativity
- Electronic literature
- Expository writing
- Fan fiction
- Fiction writing
- High School for Writing and Communication Arts (in New York City)
- Iowa Writers' Workshop
- Literature
- Naked Writing
- Show, don't tell
- Songwriting
- Stream of consciousness (narrative mode)
- Writer's block
- Writing
- Writing circle
- Writing process
- Writing style
- Writing Workshop
