= Doublespeak =

Language that deliberately disguises, distorts, or reverses the meaning of words

Doublespeak is language that deliberately obscures, disguises, distorts, or reverses the meaning of words. Doublespeak may take the form of euphemisms (e.g., "downsizing" for layoffs and "servicing the target" for bombing), in which case it is primarily meant to make the truth sound more palatable. It may also refer to intentional ambiguity in language or to actual inversions of meaning. In such cases, doublespeak disguises the nature of the truth.

Doublespeak is most closely associated with political language used by large entities such as corporations and governments.

== Origins and concepts ==
The term doublespeak derives from two concepts in George Orwell's 1949 novel, Nineteen Eighty-Four, "doublethink" and "Newspeak", despite the term itself not being used in the novel. Another version of the term, doubletalk, also referring to intentionally ambiguous speech, did exist at the time Orwell wrote his book, but the usage of doublespeak, as well as of "doubletalk", in the sense of emphasizing ambiguity, clearly predates the publication of the novel. Parallels have also been drawn between doublespeak and Orwell's classic essay, Politics and the English Language, which discusses linguistic distortion for purposes related to politics. In the essay, he observes that political language often serves to distort and obscure reality. Orwell's description of political speech is extremely similar to the popular definition of the term, doublespeak:

In our time, political speech and writing are largely the defence of the indefensible… Thus political language has to consist largely of euphemism, question-begging and sheer cloudy vagueness… the great enemy of clear language is insincerity. Where there is a gap between one's real and one's declared aims, one turns as it were instinctively to long words and exhausted idioms…

The writer Edward S. Herman cited what he saw as examples of doublespeak and doublethink in modern society. Herman describes in his book, Beyond Hypocrisy, the principal characteristics of doublespeak:

What is really important in the world of doublespeak is the ability to lie, whether knowingly or unconsciously, and to get away with it; and the ability to use lies and choose and shape facts selectively, blocking out those that don’t fit an agenda or program.

== Examples ==
=== In politics ===
Edward S. Herman and Noam Chomsky comment in their book Manufacturing Consent: the Political Economy of the Mass Media that Orwellian doublespeak is an important component of the manipulation of the English language in American media, through a process called dichotomization, a component of media propaganda involving "deeply embedded double standards in the reporting of news." For example, the use of state funds by the poor and financially needy is commonly referred to as "social welfare" or "handouts," which the "coddled" poor "take advantage of". These terms, however, are not as often applied to other beneficiaries of government spending such as military spending. The bellicose language used interchangeably with calls for peace towards Armenia by Azerbaijani president Aliyev after the Second Nagorno-Karabakh War were described as doublespeak in media.

=== In advertising ===
Advertisers can use doublespeak to mask their commercial intent from users, as users' defenses against advertising become more entrenched. Some are attempting to counter this technique with a number of systems offering diverse views and information to highlight the manipulative and dishonest methods that advertisers employ.

According to Jacques Ellul, "the aim is not to even modify people’s ideas on a given subject, rather, it is to achieve conformity in the way that people act." He demonstrates this view by offering an example from drug advertising. Use of doublespeak in advertisements resulted in aspirin production rates rising by almost 50 percent from over 23 million pounds in 1960 to over 35 million pounds in 1970.

=== In comedy ===
Doublespeak, particularly when exaggerated, can be used as a device in satirical comedy and social commentary to ironically parody political or bureaucratic establishments' intent on obfuscation or prevarication. The television series Yes Minister is notable for its use of this device. Oscar Wilde was an early proponent of this device and a significant influence on Orwell.

=== Intensify/downplay pattern ===
This pattern was formulated by Hugh Rank and is a simple tool designed to teach some basic patterns of persuasion used in political propaganda and commercial advertising. The function of the intensify/downplay pattern is not to dictate what should be discussed but to encourage coherent thought and systematic organization. The pattern works in two ways: intensifying and downplaying. All people intensify, and this is done via repetition, association and composition. Downplaying is commonly done via omission, diversion and confusion as they communicate in words, gestures, numbers, et cetera. Individuals can better cope with organized persuasion by recognizing the common ways whereby communication is intensified or downplayed, so as to counter doublespeak.

=== In social media ===
In 2022 and 2023, it was widely reported that social media users were using a form of doublespeak – sometimes called "algospeak" – to subvert content moderation on platforms such as TikTok. Examples include using the word "unalive" instead of "dead" or "kill", or using "leg booty" instead of LGBT, which users believed would prevent moderation algorithms from banning or shadow banning their accounts.

== Doublespeak Award ==
Doublespeak is often used by politicians to advance their agenda. The Doublespeak Award is an "ironic tribute to public speakers who have perpetuated language that is grossly deceptive, evasive, euphemistic, confusing, or self-centered." It has been issued by the US National Council of Teachers of English (NCTE) since 1974. The recipients of the Doublespeak Award are usually politicians, national administration or departments. An example of this is the United States Department of Defense, which won the award three times, in 1991, 1993, and 2001. For the 1991 award, the United States Department of Defense "swept the first six places in the Doublespeak top ten" for using euphemisms like "servicing the target" (bombing) and "force packages" (warplanes). Among the other phrases in contention were "difficult exercise in labor relations", meaning a strike, and "meaningful downturn in aggregate output", an attempt to avoid saying the word "recession".

== NCTE Committee on Public Doublespeak ==
The US National Council of Teachers of English (NCTE) Committee on Public Doublespeak was formed in 1971, in the midst of the Watergate scandal. It was at a point when there was widespread skepticism about the degree of truth which characterized relationships between the public and the worlds of politics, the military, and business.

NCTE passed two resolutions. One called for the council to find means to study dishonest and inhumane uses of language and literature by advertisers, to bring offenses to public attention, and to propose classroom techniques for preparing children to cope with commercial propaganda. The other called for the council to find means to study the relationships between language and public policy and to track, publicize, and combat semantic distortion by public officials, candidates for office, political commentators, and all others whose language is transmitted through the mass media.

The two resolutions were accomplished by forming NCTE's Committee on Public Doublespeak, a body which has made significant contributions in describing the need for reform where clarity in communication has been deliberately distorted.

=== Hugh Rank ===
Hugh Rank helped form the Doublespeak committee in 1971 and was its first chairman. Under his editorship, the committee produced a book called Language and Public Policy (1974), with the aim of informing readers of the extensive scope of doublespeak being used to deliberately mislead and deceive the audience. He highlighted the deliberate public misuses of language and provided strategies for countering doublespeak by focusing on educating people in the English language so as to help them identify when doublespeak is being put into play. He was also the founder of the Intensify/Downplay pattern that has been widely used to identify instances of doublespeak being used.

=== Daniel Dieterich ===
Daniel Dieterich, former chair of the National Council of Teachers of English, served as the second chairman of the Doublespeak committee after Hugh Rank in 1975. He served as editor of its second publication, Teaching about Doublespeak (1976), which carried forward the committee's charge to inform teachers of ways of teaching students how to recognize and combat language designed to mislead and misinform.

External videos
- Booknotes interview with William Lutz on Doublespeak: The Use of Language to Deceive You, December 31, 1989, C-SPAN

=== William D. Lutz ===
William D. Lutz, professor emeritus at Rutgers University-Camden has served as the third chairman of the Doublespeak Committee since 1975. In 1989, both his own book Doublespeak and, under his editorship, the committee's third book, Beyond Nineteen Eighty-Four, were published. Beyond Nineteen Eighty-Four consists of 220 pages and eighteen articles contributed by long-time Committee members and others whose bodies of work have contributed to public understanding about language, as well as a bibliography of 103 sources on doublespeak. Lutz was also the former editor of the now defunct Quarterly Review of Doublespeak, which examined the use of vocabulary by public officials to obscure the underlying meaning of what they tell the public. Lutz is one of the main contributors to the committee as well as promoting the term "doublespeak" to a mass audience to inform them of its deceptive qualities. He mentions:

There is more to being an effective consumer of language than just expressing dismay at dangling modifiers, faulty subject and verb agreement, or questionable usage. All who use language should be concerned whether statements and facts agree, whether language is, in Orwell's words, "largely the defense of the indefensible" and whether language "is designed to make lies sound truthful and murder respectable, and to give an appearance of solidity to pure wind".

== Education against doublespeak ==
Charles Weingartner, one of the founding members of the NCTE committee on Public Doublespeak mentioned: "people do not know enough about the subject (the reality) to recognize that the language being used conceals, distorts, misleads. Teachers of English should teach our students that words are not things, but verbal tokens or signs of things that should finally be carried back to the things that they stand for to be verified."

== See also ==
- Aesopian language
- Cant (language)
- Code word (figure of speech)
- Corporate jargon
- Double entendre
- Doublespeak Award
- Euphemism
- Obfuscation
- Semantic prosody
