= Hosic Report on the Reorganization of English in the Secondary Schools =

1917 American report

In 1917 the Hosic Report on the Reorganization of English in Secondary Schools placed courteous letter writing as a number one priority for education in the United States. This might provide rationale for why Pennell and Cusack (1924), writers of a manual for teachers of reading activities, included letter writing in suggested instructional activities. Other important activities suggested in the Hosic Report were expository writing, analysis of writing pieces, reports, literary composition, and debate.

In 1917, the Hosic Report on the Reorganization of English in the Secondary Schools was the first report to cite the relationship between speaking and writing, reported that the purpose of teaching composition was to enable the student to speak and write correctly to convince and interest the reader (Burrows, 1977). The first step was to cultivate sincerity through language; next to develop accuracy; and last to arouse artistic and individual expression. The goals focused on developing effective content and correct form including handwriting, spelling, grammar, capitals, and punctuation. Beyond these goals, importance was placed on enlarging vocabulary through reading. Reading authors with "concise and vigorous style" was encouraged so that the students could imitate "fine writing" (Burrows, 1977, p. 28).

From the 1917 Hosic Report, the teacher was urged to focus on developing the individual writer rather than certain forms and rules. The teacher was to observe and respond to the maturing of each student’s growth in thought and expression. This sounds very much like teachers were being instructed to teach in response to the individual learner rather than just deliver a scripted program. Teachers were told to offer many opportunities for students to write and speak on topics that were familiar and of interest to them so that they could give attention to correctness and present thoughts to convince and interest others. The belief was that composition should grow out of the experiences of the child.

The experiences included recent field trips and outside interests such as home activities and sports. Purpose and audience were stressed. In teaching composition, interesting content came first followed in importance by organization and then mechanics (punctuation, spelling, sentence structure, and word choice).

The Hosic report stated that fact writing and imaginative writing came from two types of minds. It went on to say that short story writing should not be a passing standard for students but that they should be given opportunities to see if they had a talent for it. For those that did show talent and interest, special training should be provided. The same was advocated for debating. Teachers were encouraged to use pictures to stimulate writing development using newspaper editorial cartoons as examples. Authentic purposes for letter writing with students’ interest as content were promoted. Letters by Stevenson, Dickens, Carroll, and Lincoln served as models for informal letter writing. Whose letters today would be excellent exemplars? The report mentioned that students who were clever at writing conversations which was a sign of character should have special training in dramatization and material for dramatizations could be used from local history. Smith (2002) reported that in 1920 (soon after this report) that suggestions for dramatizations followed longer stories in readers to support comprehension. Repeatedly, the Hosic Report stressed that the work should spring from the students' interests. It was after this report in the 1920s that Language Experience Charts based on children’s experiences were initiated. Reading material was developed by using students’ own compositions about their firsthand experiences (Smith, 2002). It was also at this time that ability grouping, flexible promotions, differentiated assignments, and promoting individual progression were reported (Smith, 2002, p. 183). The emphasis in writing and reading instruction at this time seemed to be giving birth to differentiated instruction and responding to student interest. The 1917 Hosic Report proposed that composition activities should come from the life of the student and "develop in him the power to express his individual experiences" (Burrows, 1977, p. 32). Developing the skill of oral composition was also a strong emphasis in order to develop the power to think in front of an audience and find language for personal expression.

James Hosic, author of this report, was an Emeritus professor at Teachers College, Columbia University as well as being the first Secretary (now Executive Director) of the National Council of Teachers of English from 1911 through 1920.
