= Predatory mortgage securitization =

Predatory mortgage securitization (predatory securitization) is any mortgage securitization products created with lax underwriting standards and improper due diligence.

A book titled The Crime of Our Time by author Danny Schechter delves deeply into the predatory securitization process and the financial collapse of 2007.
