= Nukespeak =

1982 book by Stephen Hilgartner, Richard C. Bell and Rory O'Connor

- Paperback edition
- Author: Stephen Hilgartner, Richard C. Bell, Rory O'Connor
- Original title: Nukespeak: Nuclear Language, Visions, and Mindset
- Language: English
- Subject: language and nuclear weapons and nuclear power
- Publisher: Penguin (paperback) Sierra Club Books (hardback)
- Publication date: 1982
- Publication place: United States
- Media type: Book
- Pages: 282
- Awards: National Council of Teachers of English 1982 "George Orwell Award for Distinguished Contribution to Honesty and Clarity in Public Language "
- ISBN: 9780140066845

Nukespeak: Nuclear Language, Visions and Mindset is a 1982 book by Stephen Hilgartner, Richard C. Bell and Rory O'Connor. This book is a concise history of nuclear weapons and nuclear power in the United States, with special emphasis on the language of the "nuclear mindset".

The National Council of Teachers of English gave the book's authors an Orwell Award in 1982.

== See also ==
- List of books about nuclear issues
- Nuclear and radiation accidents
