= April Baker-Bell =

American author and academic

April Baker-Bell is an American academic and the author of Linguistic Justice: Black Language, Literacy, Identity, and Pedagogy. She is the 2020 recipient of the Orwell Award from the National Council of Teachers of English.

She is a native of Detroit, Michigan, and was previously an associate professor in the English department of Michigan State University.

Her research approaches topics that combine Black language and literacies, as well as anti-Black racism.

Aprils book Linguistic Justice: Black Language, Literacy, Identity, and Pedagogy. focuses on breaking down issues surrounding black linguistic racism from using research on students experiences on breaking down the barriers placed upon them surrounding language to looking at anti-black language in youth communities.
