= Lies of Our Times =

Lies of Our Times (LOOT) was a political magazine published between January 1990 and December 1994. The magazine was published on a monthly basis. Ellen Ray was both its co-founder and publisher. It served not only as a general media critic, but as a watchdog of The New York Times, which the magazine referred to as "the most cited news medium in the United Slates, our paper of record."

In 1995, Lies of Our Times won the Orwell Award, given out annually by the National Council of Teachers of English for outstanding contributions to the critical analysis of public discourse. Among its contributors was Noam Chomsky, who wrote a regular "Letter from Lexington" for the magazine.
