= Juliet Schor =

American economist and sociologist

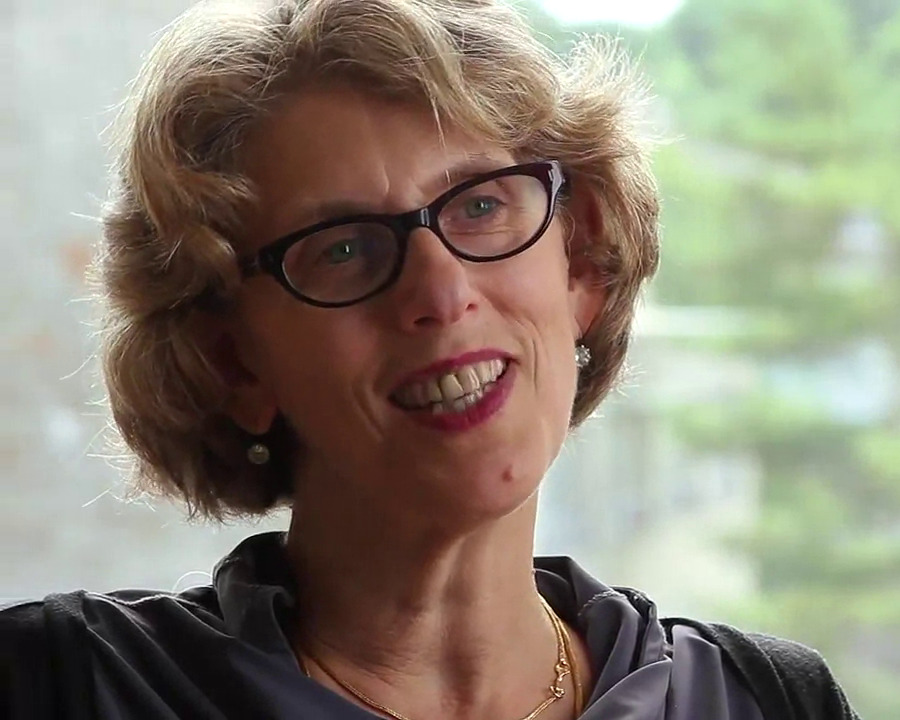
Juliet Schor in CORE project interview in 2015

Juliet B. Schor (born 1955) is an American economist and Sociology Professor at Boston College. She has studied trends in working time, consumerism, banking credit, housing policies, the relationship between work and family, economic inequality, and concerns about climate change in the environment. From 2010 to 2017, she studied the sharing economy under a large research project funded by the MacArthur Foundation. She is currently working on a project titled "The Algorithmic Workplace" with a grant from the National Science Foundation.

== Early life and education ==
Juliet Schor was born on November 9, 1955. Schor grew up in California and Pennsylvania, where her father developed the first specialty health clinic for miners in a small Pennsylvania mining town. As she grew up, she gained a stronger sense of class difference and labor exploitation. She also declares she found herself reading Karl Marx at a young age. Her husband, Prasannan Parthasarathi, is also a professor at Boston College.

Schor earned a B.A. in Economics magna cum laude from Wesleyan University in 1975 and a Ph.D. in economics from the University of Massachusetts Amherst in 1982. Her dissertation is titled "Changes in the Cyclical Variability of Wages: Evidence from Nine Countries, 1955-1980."

== Academic career ==
=== Teaching ===
Schor taught at numerous institutions around the country. Namely, she was an assistant professor of economics at Williams College and Columbia University. In 1984, she joined the Department of Economics at Harvard University and throughout her 17 years teaching there, she rose from assistant professor to eventually a senior lecturer in the Department of Economics and the Committee on Degrees in Women's Studies. In 2014–15, she was the Matina S. Horner Distinguished Visiting professor at the Radcliffe Institute at Harvard.

Currently, she is a professor of sociology at Boston College. She joined in 2001 and was department chair from 2005 to 2008 and director of graduate studies from 2001 to 2013.

=== Board memberships ===
In 1977, Schor was one of several founders and editors of South End Press. Additionally, in 1978 she was a founding member of the Center for Popular Economics.

Currently, Schor is chair of the Board of Directors of Better Future Project, and she is on the advisory board of the Center for a New American Dream. Schor stepped down from her position of chair of the Board of Directors of US Right to Know in 2019. She is also presently on the editorial boards of Sustainability: Science, Practice, and Policy (SSPP), Journal of Consumer Policy, and Reviews in Ecological Economics.

=== Appearances ===
Schor has also made multiple appearances. Namely of those is her appearance in 2017 on The People vs. American, Al-Jazeera multipart series which was awarded a Gold World Medal at the New York Festival for Film and TV. In addition, Schor has given many talks at various institutions and conferences all around the world as well.

=== Awards ===
Schor received the George Orwell Award for Distinguish Contribution to Honesty and Clarity in Public Language for her work The Overspent American from the National Council of Teachers of English in 1998; in 2006, she was awarded the Leontief Prize for Expanding the Frontiers of Economic Thought, Global Development and Environment Institute through Tufts University; in 2011, she won the Herman Daly Award from the US Society of Ecological Economics; and, most recently, she received the American Sociological Association Public Understanding of Sociology Award in 2014, in addition to several smaller accolades from various groups.

=== Fellowships ===
In 1980–81, Schor was a Brookings Research Fellow in Economic Studies. From 1995 to 1996, Schor served as a Fellow of the John Simmon Guggenheim Memorial Foundation. From 2014 to 2015, she held an Advanced Study Fellowship with the Radcliffe Institute. As of 2020, Schor is an Associate Fellow at the Tellus Institute. From 2022 to 2023, she served as the Wayne Morse Chair of Law and Politics, established in honor of the late former Senator, at the University of Oregon.

== Academic work ==
=== Early thought ===
While obtaining her Ph.D. in economics from the University of Massachusetts Amherst, Schor began to explore how employers controlled and regulated employees. She and her advisor, Sam Bowles, called these variable of conditions “the cost of job loss,” which included how long people can expect to be unemployed and what kind of social welfare benefits they are eligible for as an unemployed individuals.

While a professor at Harvard, Schor was interested in another determinant of “the cost of job loss,” which was the number of hours worked by the employee. By analyzing various data, she found that even though employees work overtime, they seem to have no money saved at the end. This led to her question “What do workers do with the money they earn and why is it so hard for them to save money,” which required the investigation of social pressures on spending and consumer culture.

In an interview discussing her book Plenitude: The New Economics of True Wealth she says, "When people work too many hours they tend to feel deprived and they use consumption to reward themselves, whether that be for an expensive vacation, kitchen remodel or a bigger diamond. The downturn has actually opened up space for people to think about different trajectories for their consumption expectations over their lifetimes."

In addition, at an early age, Schor strived to make her work accessible to all. In an interview with Peter Shea, she talks about her early intellectual formation, her critique of conventional economics, and her decision to write for an audience that includes the general public as well as her colleagues in the academy.

=== Best-seller books ===
==== The Overworked American: The Unexpected Decline of Leisure, Basic Books (1992) ====
By using household survey data on hours of paid work and one's time use, Schor discovered that average time spent at work increased around 1 month per year between the years of 1969 and 1987. Further, in the book, Schor discusses a model she developed to predict hours of unpaid work in the home.

==== The Overspent American: Why We Want What We Don't Need (1999) ====
In this book, Schor explores the social and cultural processes that drive individuals to unsustainable spending and debt. She analyzes that consumers are spending more than they did in the past. As a result, she observes that saving rates have been on a decline. Schor argues that one of the reasons for this change is the “keeping up” process of spending which has gradually led to overspending. Schor connects this trend with the work of Pierre Bourdieu, especially his ideas of habitus.

==== Born to Buy: The Commercialized Child and the New Consumer Culture (2005) ====
Many companies have targeted marketing products towards children and in turn, have made them into “commercialized children.” Schor looks at how advertising strategies convince kids that products are necessary to their social survival and this is adopted into their mindsets for their future as well. Schor also provides a sort of optimism at the end, advising parents and teachers on how to deal with this problem.

==== Plenitude: The New Economics of True Wealth (2010) ====
In this work, Schor outlines a roadmap to move beyond consumerism and consumerism's inherent link to ecological decline. She favors a well-balanced approach to living, considering such elements as nature, community, intelligence, and time. Schor narrated a short film on the economic organization discussed in her book for an animation by Films for Action.

==== After the Gig (2020) ====
In After the Gig, Schor explores the gig economy, e.g. Uber, Airbnb, etc., and effects of such organizations on worker exploitation, carbon emissions, and racial discrimination. Looking at data extracted from thirteen cases, Schor comes to offer a better means for creating a shared and equitable economy.

== Publications ==
Books

- The Overworked American: The Unexpected Decline of Leisure, Basic Books (1992)
- Sustainable Economy for the 21st Century, (1995, 1999)
- Barry, John (2015). "Review of Sustainable Lifestyles and the Quest for Plenitude: Case Studies of the New Economy". American Journal of Sociology. 121 (3): 978–980. doi:10.1086/682882. ISSN 0002-9602. JSTOR 10.1086/682882.
- Parigi, Paolo (2016). "Review of Sustainable Lifestyles and the Quest for Plenitude: Case Studies of the New Economy". Contemporary Sociology. 45 (4): 499–500. doi:10.1177/0094306116653953bbb. ISSN 0094-3061. JSTOR 43996628. S2CID 147976298.
- The Overspent American: Why We Want What We Don't Need (1999)
- Born to Buy: The Commercialized Child and the New Consumer Culture (2005)
- Plenitude: The New Economics of True Wealth, Penguin Press (2010)
- Toward a Plenitude Economy (2015)
- After the Gig (2020)

As coeditor or coauthor

- The Golden Age of Capitalism: Reinterpreting the Postwar Experience, (1992)
- Do Americans Shop too Much?, (2000)
- The Consumer Society Reader, (2000)
- Sustainable Planet: Solutions for the 21st Century, (2003)
- Sustainable Lifestyles and the Quest for Plenitude (2014)

Journal articles

- "The Sharing Economy: labor, inequality and sociability on for-profit platforms" (Societal Transitions, 2017)
- Complicating Conventionalization" (Journal of Marketing Management, 2017)
- "Does the Sharing Economy Increase Inequality Within the Eighty Percent?: Findings from a Qualitative Study of Platform Providers" (2017, Cambridge Journal of Regions, Economy and Society)
- "Paradoxes of Openness and Distinction in the Sharing Economy" (2016, Poetics)
- "Climate Discourse and Economic Downturns: The case of the United States 2008-2013" (2014, Environmental Innovation and Societal Transitions)

== Sources ==
- "Advisory Board". Center for a New American Dream. Archived from the original on 6 April 2015.
- "Reflections on popular-economics-an-interview-with Juliet Schor". Center for Popular Economics. 15 September 2014. Archived from the original on 14 April 2015.
- "Juliet B. Schor". American Sociological Association. 5 January 2015.
