= Doublespeak Award =

Ironic award given to deceptive public speakers

The Doublespeak Award was a humorous award in the United States of America. It was described as an "ironic tribute to public speakers who have perpetuated language that is grossly deceptive, evasive, euphemistic, confusing, or self-centered", i.e. those who have engaged in doublespeak. It was issued by the US National Council of Teachers of English between 1974 and 2020. Nominees needed to be from the US, though in 1975 the award was given to Yasser Arafat. In 2022, it was announced the award would be superseded by an annual list of multiple examples of such language from a public spokesperson or group, to be called The Year in Doublespeak.

Its opposite is the Orwell Award for authors, editors, or producers of a print or non-print work that "contributes to honesty and clarity in public language".

== Winners ==
The recipients of the award have included:

=== 1970s ===
- 1974 – David H.E. Opfer, United States Air Force press officer, for calling bombing raids in Southeast Asia "air support".
- 1975 – Yasser Arafat, for saying that the bloodshed in Israel and Palestine exists because the Palestine Liberation Organization wants the two to coexist.
- 1976 – United States State Department, for appointing a consumer affairs coordinator to "review existing mechanisms of consumer input, thruput, and output, and seek ways of improving these linkages via the 'consumer communication channel.'"
- 1977 – The Pentagon and the Energy Research and Development Administration, for stating that an efficient nuclear bomb is one that "eliminates an enemy with minimal damage to friendly territory".
- 1978 – Earl Clinton Bolton, for authoring a memo for the Central Intelligence Agency (CIA) detailing how academics assisting the CIA should behave when being questioned, including by explaining their relationship with the CIA "as a contribution to proper academic goals" and that any affiliation with the CIA is protected under "academic freedom" and "privilege and tenure".
- 1979 – The nuclear power industry, for inventing a number of jargon terms and euphemisms before, during, and after the Three Mile Island accident, including referring to an explosion as "energetic disassembly", fire as "rapid oxidation", and a reactor accident as an "event", an "abnormal evolution", a "normal aberration", or a "plant transient".

=== 1980s ===
- 1980 – Ronald Reagan, for making numerous speeches that contained inaccurate assertions, statistics, and misrepresentations of his record as the Governor of California.
- 1981 – Alexander Haig, for statements made before Congress about the murder of religious workers in El Salvador.
- 1982 – Republican National Committee, for crediting Ronald Reagan for a cost-of-living increase in Social Security that originated from a law that passed before he took office.
- 1983 – Ronald Reagan, for calling the MX intercontinental ballistic missile the "Peacekeeper", and condemning countries that promote violence and terrorism in other countries while providing covert aid to the Contras in Nicaragua.
- 1984 – United States State Department, for using "unlawful or arbitrary deprivation of life" as a euphemism for "killing", and, after the U.S. invasion of Grenada, referring to arrests made as "detainments".
- 1985 – Central Intelligence Agency, for its Psychological Operations in Guerrilla Warfare manual distributed to the Contras in Nicaragua.
- 1986 – Officials of NASA, Thiokol, and Rockwell International, for comments made in the aftermath of the Space Shuttle Challenger disaster, including referring to the explosion as an "anomaly", the astronauts' bodies as "recovered components", and the astronauts' coffins as "crew transfer containers".
- 1987 – Oliver North and John Poindexter, for referring to profits made from the Iran–Contra affair as "residuals" and "diversions" and subtly acknowledging responsibility for selling weapons but refusing to directly state said responsibility.
- 1988 – Defense Sec. Frank Carlucci, Adm. William J. Crowe, and Rear Adm. William Fogarty, for making comments filled with omissions, contradictions, misdirections, and distortions that downplayed the shooting down of Iran Air Flight 655.
- 1989 – Exxon, for referring to about 35 miles (56 km) of Alaskan shoreline with oil on them as "environmentally clean" and "environmentally stabilized", then using "treated" in place of "clean" and "stabilized" after reports were made of the oil's presence.

=== 1990s ===
- 1990 – George H. W. Bush, for making comments that contradicted his governing, including saying taxes wouldn't be raised then raising taxes, saying that women shouldn't have to worry about getting a job after maternity leave then vetoing the Parental and Medical Leave bill, and for creating numerous terms to avoid using the word "invasion" when talking about the United States invasion of Panama.
- 1991 – United States Department of Defense, for creating numerous euphemisms during the Gulf War to obscure the realities of war, including referring to bombing attacks as "efforts", bombing missions as "visiting a site", and warplanes as "weapons systems" or "force packages".
- 1992 – George H. W. Bush, for stating that the Gulf War would reduce the proliferation of arms internationally then ending the U.S. policy of not giving arms to other countries, for saying that diverting funds from public schools to private schools gave parents more "choice" as to where they send their children to school, and for exaggerating tax increases that occurred in Arkansas during Bill Clinton's governorship.
- 1993 – United States Department of Defense, for deliberately providing false information to Congress about the cost and feasibility of the Strategic Defense Initiative, for rigging test results in this program, and for exaggerating the progression and sophistication of these tests and their success rates.
- 1994 – Rush Limbaugh, for distorting the truth dozens of times in nearly 1,000 media outlets nationwide, including saying that long lines at gas pumps in the 1970s were attributable to foreign oil powers not fearing Jimmy Carter, even though these lines were most severe before Jimmy Carter became or ran for president.
- 1995 – Newt Gingrich, for numerous contradictions in his book To Renew America, including stating that "true Americans" don't blame their problems on others and then proceeding to pick out each of America's supposed problems and blaming them on a certain group, and for using a number of misleading euphemisms and titles in the Contract with America, including "The Job Creation and Wage Enhancement Act", which contained no provisions to create jobs or raise wages.
- 1996 – Joe Klein, author of Primary Colors, for using loaded language to attack others for journalistic ethics violations that he himself was in violation of.
- 1997 – Bill Clinton, Trent Lott, and Newt Gingrich, for engaging in bipartisan deceit about a budget deal that they claimed would produce balanced budgets, even though it raised spending and cut taxes.
- 1998 – US Supreme Court Justice Clarence Thomas, for referring to his critics as "illiterate" and "racist" and for speaking out against affirmative action when he has benefited from it.
- 1999 – National Rifle Association of America, for using loaded language to paint support for the NRA's interpretation of the Second Amendment and gun rights as being a duty of Americans, while painting support for gun control as tyrannical, oppressive, and anti-American.

=== 2000s ===
- 2000 – The tobacco industry, for portraying tobacco companies as benefactors of children, abused women, and disaster victims while selling a dangerous drug that has at times been marketed to these groups of people.
- 2001 – United States Department of Defense, for referring to years of test failures in the Missile Defense System as a success.
- 2002 – New York State Regents, for editing English reading passages in exams to remove any content that might cause "any student to feel ill at ease when taking the test".
- 2003 – George W. Bush, for lying about Iraq's possession of weapons of mass destruction and using those lies as justification for going to war.
- 2004 – George W. Bush Administration, for the same things as the previous year, for manipulating and forging intelligence data about Iraq, for creating euphemisms to downplay the Abu Ghraib torture and prisoner abuse, and for the Justice Department turning a blind eye to torture authorized by officials in the Bush Administration.
- 2005 – Philip A. Cooney, for editing scientific reports to deceive the public about the nature of global warming and climate change and of the Bush Administration's negligence in dealing with these issues.
- 2006 – George W. Bush, for speaking out against poverty and income inequality after having just signed an executive order to permit contractors to employ people below the minimum wage in areas affected by Hurricane Katrina.
- 2007 – Alberto Gonzales, for claiming that the dismissal of eight U.S. attorneys was not political then saying that he did not recall any key events of the dismissals.
- 2008 – The term "Aspirational goal", both a tautology and a paradox, being used by George W. Bush in place of setting a deadline date for withdrawing troops from Iraq and in place of creating any plan to address global warming and climate change.
- 2009 – Glenn Beck, for attacking efforts to reform the U.S. health care system after claiming that America's health care system needed to be reformed.

=== 2010s ===
- 2010 – Dick Armey, for, through FreedomWorks, making fake grassroots organizations, for objecting to efforts to reduce the number of smokers, saying that smokers are needed to finance health care reform, and for disputing the existence of global warming.
- 2011 – Chad "Corntassel" Smith, for using a federal government program that had previously been used to discriminate against Native Americans to discriminate against Cherokees with partial black ancestry.
- 2012 – American Petroleum Institute, for making misleading public statements about the regulation of oil and natural gas, insinuating that any increase in taxes would decrease corporate and government revenue, for omitting the effects of oil and natural gas on the environment and consumers, and for failing to disclose the financial conflicts of interest of the people making these claims.
- 2013 – Rahm Emanuel, for creating a formula to calculate "school utilization" based on the average number of students in each homeroom. Schools with smaller classroom sizes would be labeled as "underutilized" and be closed down, while schools with larger classroom sizes would be labeled as properly "utilized". This is in conflict with the existing evidence that students perform better in smaller classroom sizes.
- 2014 – No winner announced.
- 2015 – Senator Joni Ernst, for referring to proposed Keystone XL Pipeline legislation as the "Keystone Jobs Bill" in her response to President Obama's State of the Union address. The phrase implies that the legislation is primarily about job creation, downplaying complex environmental issues and lobbying of the oil industry.
- 2016 – Donald Trump, for the obfuscation and inconsistency of his statements and proposals in pursuit of the United States presidency. The committee cited his "unique gift of capitalizing on what he labels the dishonesty of his opponent, all while spinning unsubstantiated claims of his own". The five member committee unanimously voted Trump as the champion of the dubious Doublespeak honor, with one member quoted as saying, "I don't think we've ever had a better example of the Doublespeak Award."
- 2017 – Kellyanne Conway, for coining the term "alternative facts" to defend President Trump's falsehoods about inauguration crowd sizes. This is a marquee example of Conway's commitment to spinning untruths into rhetorical rallying cries. This phrase meets all descriptors of the Doublespeak Award for "perpetuating language that is grossly deceptive, evasive, euphemistic, confusing, or self-centered".
- 2018 – Rudy Giuliani, for his August 19 statement "truth isn't truth" on Meet the Press.
- 2019 – Donald Trump, for perpetuating language that is grossly deceptive, evasive, euphemistic, confusing, and self-centered.

=== 2020s ===
- 2020 – The phrase “China Virus” and those who use it.
- 2021 – No award given. The award is being "re-imagined [snip] in order to align it with our current mission, vision, values, and policies...".

== Discontinuation ==
In 2022, the NCTE discontinued the award, and planned to replace it with an annual list of multiple examples, to be titled The Year in Doublespeak.

== See also ==
- Orwell Award – American non-fiction literary award
- Big Brother Awards – Ironic award for threats to personal privacy
