= Donald H. Graves =

American author and educator

- Born: Donald Hiller Graves; September 11, 1930; Fall River, Massachusetts, U.S.
- Died: September 28, 2010 (aged 80); Falmouth, Maine, U.S.

Academic background
- Education: Bridgewater State University (MEd); University at Buffalo (EdD)

Academic work
- Discipline: Education
- Sub-discipline: Writing education
- Military career
- Branch: United States Coast Guard

Donald Hiller Graves (September 11, 1930 – September 28, 2010) was an American author and educator who specialized in the field of writing education.

== Early life and education ==
Graves was born in Fall River, Massachusetts. His parents were a nurse and school principal. He earned a master's degree in education from Bridgewater State University. In 1973, Graves completed a doctorate in education at University at Buffalo.

== Career ==
Graves served in the United States Coast Guard before becoming an elementary school teacher and school principal. He is recognized as an expert in the field of writing education. He pioneered new methods of teaching writing and published 26 books in 25 years, primarily on the topics of teaching and writing. He believed that all children can write, and viewed writing as an important form of self-expression. The National Council of Teachers of English (NCTE) named the Donald H. Graves writing award in his honor. Graves died on September 28, 2010, in Falmouth, Maine.
