= Linguistic Justice =

2020 book by April Baker-Bell

Linguistic Justice: Black Language, Literacy, Identity, and Pedagogy
- Author: April Baker-Bell
- Language: English
- Series: NCTE-Routledge Research Series
- Publisher: Routledge
- Publication date: 2020
- Publication place: United States
- ISBN: 978-1-138-55101-5

Linguistic Justice: Black Language, Literacy, Identity, and Pedagogy is a 2020 nonfiction book by April Baker-Bell about anti-black racism in writing pedagogy, and ways for English teachers to combat it.

== Summary ==
Baker-Bell's book is a mix of theory and practice. It begins with an overview of black language. Baker-Bell calls for the reader to take an anti-racist stance and work to dismantle linguistic racism. The book then shares ways to put the underlying theory into practice, and discusses how these methods worked in her own classroom. The book concludes by showing the effects of putting these practices in place.

== Critical reception ==
Jason C. Evans wrote in the journal Teaching English in the Two-Year College that teachers may find the curricula outlined by Baker-Bell "helpful", and wrote that the book pairs well with Erec Smith's A Critique of Anti-racism in Rhetoric and Composition: The Semblance of Empowerment. Jessica A. Grieser strongly recommended the book, writing that most English speakers in the United States would learn something from reading it. Linguistic Justice was reviewed favorably in other academic journals as well.

== See also ==
- Teaching writing in the United States
