= College English =

Academic journal

- Discipline: English language arts for college teachers
- Language: English
- Edited by: Lori Ostergaard

Publication details
- History: 1939–present
- Publisher: National Council of Teachers of English (United States)
- Frequency: bimonthly

Standard abbreviations
- ISO 4: Coll. Engl.

Indexing
- ISSN: 0010-0994
- LCCN: 41006180
- JSTOR: 00100994
- OCLC no.: 1564053

Links
- Journal homepage; Online access

College English is an official publication of the American National Council of Teachers of English and is aimed at college-level teachers and scholars of English. The peer-reviewed journal publishes articles on a range of topics related to the teaching of English language arts at the college level, including literature, rhetoric, critical theory, and pedagogy. It sometimes publishes special issues devoted to specific themes. Its content is accessible electronically via ERIC, ProQuest, and JSTOR, and is indexed by the MLA.

== History ==
College English began in 1939 when it was spun off from The English Journal. Its first editor was W. Wilbur Hatfield, who also edited The English Journal. He continued to edit both publications until 1955.

=== Editors ===
Since its founding in 1939, College English has had eleven editors:

- W. Wilbur Hatfield (1939–1955)
- Frederick L. Gwynn (1955–1960)
- James E. Miller, Jr. (1960–1966)
- Richard Ohmann (1966–1978)
- Donald Gray (1978–1985)
- James C. Raymond (1985–1992)
- Louise Z. Smith (1992–1999)
- Jeanne Gunner (1999–2006)
- John Schilb (2006–2012)
- Kelly Ritter (2012–2017)
- Melissa Ianetta (2017–2022)
- Lori Ostergaard (2022–present)

== See also ==
- National Council of Teachers of English
- Composition studies
- English studies
- College Composition and Communication
