= Born to Buy =

2004 book

- Author: Juliet Schor
- Subject: Consumerism, sociology of childhood
- Publisher: Scribner
- Publication date: 2004
- Pages: 304

Born to Buy: The Commercialized Child and the New Consumer Culture is a 2004 book by Juliet Schor on consumerist targeting of children.

== Bibliography ==
- Austin, John (2006). "The Dangers of the Brand-Name Child". Independent School. 65 (2): 109–110. ISSN 0145-9635. EBSCOhost 20294704.
- Barbieri, A. (2005). "Just Say No (Rev. of Born to Buy)". New Statesman. No. 4734. p. 53. ISSN 1364-7431. EBSCOhost RN168103497.
- Boscher, Seb (November 2005). "Rev. of Born to Buy". Ecologist. 35 (9): 64–65. ISSN 0261-3131. EBSCOhost 18832235.
- Conlin, Michelle (September 27, 2004). "The Stepford Kids". BusinessWeek (3901): 26–27. ISSN 0007-7135. EBSCOhost 14438676.
- "'Get Rid of the TV' (interview)". BusinessWeek Online. October 8, 2004. EBSCOhost 14729112.
- Green, M. Christian (2006). "Between Vulnerability and Agency: An Interdisciplinary Look at the Status and Value of Children". The Journal of Religion. 86 (4): 658–668. doi:10.1086/505898. ISSN 0022-4189. JSTOR 10.1086/505898. S2CID 170130189.
- Hoffert, Barbara (May 2004). "Rev. of Born to Buy". Library Journal. Vol. 129, no. 8. ISSN 0363-0277. EBSCOhost edsbig.A116491043.
- Hymowitz, Kay (Winter 2005). "Childhood for sale?". Public Interest. No. 158. pp. 125–130. ISSN 0033-3557. EBSCOhost RN160753958.
- "Interview: Juliet Schor discusses her new book 'Born to Buy'", All Things Considered, National Public Radio, September 4, 2004, EBSCOhost edsgcl.162037514
- Lagace, Martha (October 18, 2004). "Born to Buy: The Commercialized Child and the New Consumer Culture". HBS Working Knowledge.
- "Rev. of Born to Buy: The Marketing and the Transformation of Childhood and Culture (book)". Psychology Today. 37 (5): 34. September 2004. ISSN 0033-3107. EBSCOhost 14199139.
- "Rev. of Born to Buy: The Commercialized Child and the New Consumer Culture (book)". Publishers Weekly. 251 (25): 52–53. June 21, 2004. ISSN 0000-0019. EBSCOhost 13503410.
- Roy, Sree (March 2005). "Born to buy". Display & Design Ideas. 17 (3): 24. ISSN 1049-9172. EBSCOhost 16471332.
- Seckler, Valerie (September 22, 2004). "The Dangers of Tween Marketing". WWD: Women's Wear Daily. 188 (63): 14. ISSN 0149-5380. EBSCOhost 14618984.
- Shufro, Cathy (September 2005). "Consuming Kids". E: The Environmental Magazine. 16 (5): 61–63. ISSN 1046-8021. EBSCOhost 17979657.
- Woolman, James (September 2004). "Born to Buy". Dollars & Sense (255): 24–28. ISSN 0012-5245. EBSCOhost 14743176.
