= After the Gig =

2020 book by Juliet Schor

- First edition
- Author: Juliet Schor
- Subject: Labor history, gig economy
- Publisher: University of California Press
- Publication date: 2020
- Pages: 272
- ISBN: 9780520325050

After the Gig: How the Sharing Economy Got Hijacked and How to Win It Back is a 2020 book by Juliet Schor.

== Bibliography ==
- Bertolini, Alessio (March 2021). "Book Review: After the Gig: How the Sharing Economy Got Hijacked and How to Win It Back, by Juliet B. Schor". Industrial & Labor Relations Review. 74 (2): 544–545. doi:10.1177/0019793920969156. ISSN 0019-7939. S2CID 228817328. EBSCOhost 148624129.
- Kathleen Sullivan (October 2020). "Boston College Sociologist's New Book on the 'Gig' Economy". Boston College.
- Brancaccio, David; Soderstrom, Erika; Schroeder, Alex (August 31, 2020). "The gig economy and how workers might win it back". Marketplace.
- Harbert, Tam (September 3, 2020). "Reclaiming the Gig Economy". MIT Sloan Management Review.
- Hill, Andrew; Berwick, Isabel; Conboye, Janina; Lee, Dave; Jack, Andrew (September 8, 2020). "FT business books: September edition". Financial Times.
- Kinni, Theodore (Spring 2021). "Is the gig up?". strategy+business. No. 102.
- "Rev. of After the Gig". Kirkus Reviews. June 30, 2020.
- "Rev. of After the Gig: How the Sharing Economy Got Hijacked and How to Win It Back". Publishers Weekly. 267 (22): 52–53. June 2020. ISSN 0000-0019. EBSCOhost 143488286.
- Schor, Juliet B. (September 2021). "Rev. of 'After the Gig: How the Sharing Economy Got Hijacked and How to Win It Back'". Social Forces. 100 (1): e20. doi:10.1093/sf/soab044. ISSN 0037-7732. EBSCOhost 151310302.
- Rule, Tanisha (June 27, 2020). "After the Gig; How the Sharing Economy Got Hijacked and How to Win It Back". ForeWord. ISSN 1099-2642. EBSCOhost edsgcl.627992028.
