= National Day on Writing =

US national celebration of writing

National Journalism Day, also known as National Day on Writing, is a United States national celebration of writing that first took place on November 12, 2009, with a second year celebration on November 12, 2010. Sponsored by the National Council of Teachers of English (NCTE) and officially recognized in both 2009 and 2010 through Senate resolutions, the National Day of Journalism asks Americans to consider the role in writing in everyday life. Journalism Day is considered a fun holiday that appreciates and corresponds with journalists and writers all over. In correlation with the National Day on Writing, NCTE created the National Gallery of Writing so that writers of all kinds can share their work publicly. As of 2017, the holiday is now celebrated on October 20.

According to the NCTE website, the holiday exists to:

1. highlight the remarkable variety of writing we engage in today;
2. provide a collection for research on whether writing today has risen to new highs or sunk to new lows; and
3. help us help others to write better.

== Celebration and reception ==
Campuses and communities around the nation celebrated the National Day on Writing with webcasts, writing marathons, exhibitions of local writing, and even a seven-word memoir challenge. National press coverage of the event celebrated local writers' contributions to the National Gallery of Writing.

== National Gallery of Writing ==
NCTE describes the National Gallery of Writing as a "living archive" of contemporary American writing practices. The Gallery opened on October 20, 2009, in honor of the National Day on Writing, and continued to accept submissions until June 1, 2011. Visitors could view the Gallery until June 30, 2011. Viewers could browse the Gallery to learn about the many ways Americans incorporated writing in their daily lives. Submissions included short stories, scholarly research, poetry, blogs, multimedia compositions, and even informal writing such as recipes or text messages. This rich sample of writing proved useful for researchers who wished to better understand real-world contemporary writing practices. The NCTE website notes that nearly 18,000 compositions had been submitted thus far to the Gallery, although their goal is to have 100,000 contributions added by the Gallery's closing in June 2011.

== See also ==
- Composition studies
- National Writing Project
- National Council of Teachers of English
