= Dwight Bolinger =

American linguist

Dwight Le Merton Bolinger (August 18, 1907 – February 23, 1992) was an American linguist and Professor of Romance Languages and Literatures at Harvard University. He began his career as the first editor of the "Among the New Words" feature for American Speech. As an expert in Spanish, he was elected president of the American Association of Teachers of Spanish and Portuguese in 1960. He was known for the support and encouragement he gave younger scholars and for his hands-on approach to the analysis of human language. His work touched on a wide range of subjects, including semantics, intonation, phonesthesia, and the politics of language.

His 1971 book The Phrasal Verb in English, heretofore a subject of concern primarily to teachers of English as a foreign language, brought the need for a scientific treatment of phrasal verbs to the attention of many linguists. His 1977 work Meaning and Form was instrumental in establishing the principle that a difference in form implies a difference in perceived meaning.

He was elected president of the Linguistic Society of America in 1972 and awarded the Orwell Award by the National Council of Teachers of English in 1981 for Language—The Loaded Weapon, a book that inspired other linguists to restore a role for the application of common sense in the study of language. Stanford linguist Geoffrey Nunberg has described Bolinger as "one of the most distinguished semanticists" of the mid-twentieth century, pointing to his "uncanny ear for the nuances of words."
