= The Overworked American =

1992 book

- Author: Juliet Schor
- Subject: American labor
- Publisher: Basic Books
- Publication date: 1992
- Pages: 247
- ISBN: 0-465-05433-1

The Overworked American: The Unexpected Decline of Leisure is a 1992 book by labor economist Juliet Schor on the increase of Americans' working hours in the late 20th century.

== Bibliography ==
- Bostrom, Ann (1992). "Working Women". Transition (58): 162–168. doi:10.2307/2934974. ISSN 0041-1191. JSTOR 2934974.
- Cross, Gary (1992). "Review of The Overworked American: The Unexpected Decline of Leisure". The Business History Review. 66 (4): 805–806. doi:10.2307/3116863. ISSN 0007-6805. JSTOR 3116863.
- Dinnerstein, Myra (1993). "Review of The Overworked American: The Unexpected Decline of Leisure". The Journal of American History. 79 (4): 1691–1692. doi:10.2307/2080359. ISSN 0021-8723. JSTOR 2080359.
- Eastman, Wayne (1997). "SQUEEZED FOR TIME: Should Cutting Work Hours Be a Priority for Environmentalists?". Organization & Environment. 10 (4): 444–448. doi:10.1177/192181069701000408. ISSN 1086-0266. JSTOR 26161562.
- Grossin, William (1993). "Review of The Overworked American. The Unexpected Decline of Leisure". L'Année sociologique (1940/1948-). 43: 535–538. ISSN 0066-2399. JSTOR 27890239.
- Hamermesh, Daniel S. (1993). "Review of The Overworked American: The Unexpected Decline of Leisure". Industrial and Labor Relations Review. 46 (2): 419–420. doi:10.2307/2524892. ISSN 0019-7939. JSTOR 2524892.
- Hedges, Janice Neipert (1992). "Work and leisure". Monthly Labor Review. 115 (5): 53–54. ISSN 0098-1818. JSTOR 41843965.
- Kuttner, Robert (February 2, 1992). "No Time to Smell the Roses Anymore". The New York Times. ISSN 0362-4331.
- Lembcke, Jerry Lee (1994). "Review of The Overworked American: The Unexpected Decline of Leisure". Science & Society. 58 (1): 93–95. ISSN 0036-8237. JSTOR 40403388.
- Martin, Patricia Yancey (1992). "Review of The Overworked American: The Unexpected Decline of Leisure". Contemporary Sociology. 21 (6): 843–845. doi:10.2307/2075676. ISSN 0094-3061. JSTOR 2075676.
- Meeropol, Michael (1992). "Review of The Overworked American: The Unexpected Decline of Leisure". Challenge. 35 (4): 60–63. doi:10.1080/05775132.1992.11471606. ISSN 0577-5132. JSTOR 40721366.
- Munnell, Alicia H. (1992). "All work and no play?". Issues in Science and Technology. 8 (3): 80–83. ISSN 0748-5492. JSTOR 43311201.
- Ostroot, Nathalie M. (1995). "Review of The Overworked American: The Unexpected Decline of Leisure". Social Indicators Research. 34 (2): 289–293. ISSN 0303-8300. JSTOR 27522807.
- Pahl, Ray (1993). "Rigid Flexibilities? - Work Between Men and Women". Work, Employment & Society. 7 (4): 629–642. doi:10.1177/095001709374007. ISSN 0950-0170. JSTOR 23746024.
- Rabinbach, Anson (1993). "Science, Work, and Worktime". International Labor and Working-Class History. 43 (43): 48–64. doi:10.1017/S0147547900011820. ISSN 0147-5479. JSTOR 27672060.
- "Review of The Overworked American: The Unexpected Decline of Leisure". The Wilson Quarterly. 16 (1): 106–107. 1992. ISSN 0363-3276. JSTOR 40258239.
- Stafford, Frank P. (1992). "Review of The Overworked American. The Unexpected Decline of Leisure". Journal of Economic Literature. 30 (3): 1528–1529. ISSN 0022-0515. JSTOR 2728090.
- Sullivan, Teresa A. (1993). "Review of The Overworked American: The Unexpected Decline of Leisure". Social Science Quarterly. 74 (4): 922–923. ISSN 0038-4941. JSTOR 42863265.
- Van Wagner, Marcia J. (1994). "Review of The Overworked American". Eastern Economic Journal. 20 (1): 125–126. ISSN 0094-5056. JSTOR 40325551.
- Voos, Paula B. (1993). "Review of The Overworked American: The Unexpected Decline of Leisure". The Annals of the American Academy of Political and Social Science. 526: 234. doi:10.1177/0002716293526001053. ISSN 0002-7162. JSTOR 1047515.
- Wilson, John (1993). "Review of The Overworked American: The Unexpected Decline of Leisure". American Journal of Sociology. 98 (4): 940–941. doi:10.1086/230106. ISSN 0002-9602. JSTOR 2781252.
