= True Wealth =

2010 book

- Author: Juliet Schor
- Publisher: Penguin Press
- Publication date: 2010
- Pages: 258
- ISBN: 978-1-59420-254-4

External videos
- The author speaks on Book TV, June 2010

True Wealth: How and Why Millions of Americans are Creating a Time-Rich, Ecologically Light, Small-Scale, High-Satisfaction Economy is a 2010 book by Juliet Schor that argues for a redefinition of wealth based on allocation of free time, making things for oneself, environmentally-aware consumption, and stronger social connections.

It was originally published as Plenitude: The New Economics of True Wealth and retitled for its paperback edition.

== Bibliography ==
- Milberg, William (2011). "Review of Plenitude: The New Economics of True Wealth". Journal of Economic Literature. 49 (4): 1314–1317. doi:10.1257/jel.49.4.1230.r30. ISSN 0022-0515. JSTOR 23071696.
- Millmow, Alex (October 2010). "Plenty, plentiful, plenitude (Review of Plenitude: The New Economics of True Wealth)". Australian Review of Public Affairs. ISSN 1832-1526. EBSCOhost edsaup.81114279483.
- Priesnitz, Wendy (March 1, 2015). "Visualizing a Plenitude Economy". Natural Life. p. 31. ISSN 0701-8002. EBSCOhost 101764213.
- "Rev. of Plenitude: The New Economics of True Wealth". The Age (Melbourne, Australia). June 19, 2010. ISSN 0312-6307. EBSCOhost edsgcl.278230124.
- Schurman, Rachel (2011). "Review of Plenitude: The New Economics of True Wealth". Contemporary Sociology. 40 (4): 485–486. doi:10.1177/0094306111412516mm. ISSN 0094-3061. JSTOR 23042239. S2CID 144026562.
- Smith, Richard (2011). "Growth without greed". BMJ: British Medical Journal. 343 (7813): 46. ISSN 0959-8138. JSTOR 23048585.
