= Naked writing =

Form of writing

Naked writing is a creative writing process which allows readers to observe the writing as it happens, before final edits are made by parties including the writer, agents, editors or publishers.

Traditionally, a manuscript changes between the initial draft and final publication. Naked writing "exposes" the author's work before these later phases. This is claimed to heighten the connection between the reader and the writer. In some cases the author modifies the work following observer comments and suggestions.

Other readers prefer to read finished material that has gone through the traditional publishing process.

== Examples of naked writing ==
Georges Simenon sat in a glass cage and wrote an entire novel in one week.

Harlan Ellison used to write in bookstores, beginning a new story when the establishment opened and have it finished by closing time. As each page was completed, the book store would copy and post it in the windows. Ellison said he did this to allow the public to "see what writers do".
