= Haig Bosmajian =

American writer (1928–2014)

Haig Aram Bosmajian (March 26, 1928 – June 17, 2014) was an author, lecturer, and professor, who received the 1983 Orwell Award for his book The Language of Oppression (1974). Haig Bosmajian received a PhD in 1960 from Stanford University. His work has explored rhetoric and the freedom of speech. Bosmajian was professor emeritus at the University of Washington, in the Speech/Communications Department, where he taught since 1965. He was married for 57 years to Hamida Bosmajian, also a published author and a professor at nearby Seattle University.

Haig and Hamida Bosmajian wrote the textbook, The Rhetoric of the Civil Rights Movement (1969), which has been published as a student textbook to analyze strategies of rhetoric.

== Works ==
Selected works by Haig Bosmajian include:

- Anita Whitney, Louis Brandeis, and the First Amendment
- Burning Books (March 2006, 233 pages) ISBN 0-7864-2208-4.
- The Freedom Not to Speak (New York, 1999, 248p.) ISBN 0-8147-1297-5.
- Metaphor and Reason in Judicial Opinions (July 1992)
- The Freedom to Publish (New York: Neal-Schuman, 1989, 230p.)
- The Freedom of Religion (First Amendment in the Classroom) (June 1987)
- Freedom to Read (April 1987)
- Censorship, Libraries, and the Law (1983)
- The Language of Oppression (1974)
- The Principles and Practice of Freedom of Speech (1971)
- Dissent, Symbolic Behavior and Rhetorical Strategies
- Readings in speech (1965)
- "The Communist Manifesto: Critical Essay"
- "Lying to the People", Western Journal of Speech Communication, Fall 1991.
- "Dehumanizing People and Euphemizing War", Christian Century, December 5, 1984.
