= English Journal =

- Discipline: English language arts for middle and high school
- Language: English
- Edited by: Julie Gorlewski

Publication details
- History: 1912–present
- Publisher: National Council of Teachers of English (United States)
- Frequency: Bimonthly

Standard abbreviations
- ISO 4: Engl. J.

Indexing
- ISSN: 0013-8274
- LCCN: 2004-235660
- JSTOR: 00138274
- OCLC no.: 1325886

Links
- Journal homepage

English Journal (previously The English Journal) is the official publication of the Secondary Education section of the American National Council of Teachers of English. The peer-reviewed journal has been published since 1912, and features columns and articles on all aspects of the teaching of English language arts at middle schools and junior and senior high schools.

In 1939, the journal College English was spun off from The English Journal to address the needs of teaching English language arts at the college level.

As of 2018, the journal's editors are Toby Emert, Ph.D., of Agnes Scott College in Decatur, Georgia, and R. Joseph Rodríguez, Ph.D., of California State University, Fresno. Its content is accessible electronically via ERIC, ProQuest, and JSTOR, and is indexed by the MLA.

Regular features include articles on pedagogy, literature, ELL issues, and educational technology. The journal also accepts poetry submissions.
