= Rory O'Connor (rugby union, born 1932) =

Welsh rugby union player

- Born: 14 September 1932 Neath, Wales
- Died: 7 March 1986 (aged 53) Aberavon, Wales

Rugby union career
- Position: Wing-forward
International career
Years	Team	Apps	(Points)
1957	Wales	1	(0)

Rory O'Connor (14 September 1932 — 7 March 1986) was a Welsh international rugby union player.

Born in Neath, O'Connor was a wing-forward and played his rugby with Aberavon. He made his solitary Wales appearance against England at Cardiff Arms Park in the 1957 Five Nations. There was a suggestion that his selection was to prevent him being picked by Ireland, which he had been qualified to represent through ancestry prior to his Wales cap.

O'Connor worked as a rigger at Margam Steelworks.

== See also ==
- List of Wales national rugby union players
