= Lou L. LaBrant =

American schoolteacher and writer

- Born: May 28, 1888; Hinckley, Illinois
- Died: February 25, 1991 (aged 102); Lawrence, Kansas
- Occupation: Teacher
- Years active: 1900s-1980s

Lou L. LaBrant (May 28, 1888 – February 25, 1991) was an American schoolteacher and writer. She was president of the National Council of Teachers of English in 1954 and a pioneer in English education, championing holistic and child-centered approaches to the teaching of reading and writing.

== Biography ==
LaBrant was born in Hinckley, Illinois and started teaching in public high schools and experimental schools in the Midwest. She received her bachelor's degree in Latin at Baker University in 1911. She completed an M.A. at the University of Kansas in 1925, and received her Ph.D. from Northwestern University in 1932. She created free reading programs and worked as a founding staff member at the University School of the Ohio State University from 1932 until 1942. She taught at New York University from 1942 until 1953. From 1939 until 1943 she was a writer and editor of Journal of Educational Method, where she supported different methodological approaches.

She was president of the National Council of Teachers of English from 1953 until 1954. She was a head of the humanities division at Dillard University from 1958 until 1971, where she put into practice a pre-freshman program for African-American students.

She eventually taught in nearly every state and was the first female professor at Harvard University. With Frieda M. Heller, she started a series for cooperation between teachers and students called Experimenting Together — The Librarian and the Teacher of English. After retiring, she taught at University of Missouri–Kansas City, Clark Atlanta University and Dillard University and, in 1988, she was honored by Baker University for her 100th birthday. In 1962, she received the W. Wilbur Hatfield Award for excellence.

In 1951, her book We Teach English was published.

She died at the age of 102 in 1991 and was cremated.

== Writings ==
- Study of Certain Language Developments of Children in Grades 4-12 Inclusive, L LaBrant - Genetic Psychology Monographs, 1933
- "The Goals for Culturally Different Youth", L LaBrant - Improving English Skills of Culturally Different Youth
- "The Psychological Basis for Creative Writing", L LaBrant - English Journal, 1936 - JSTOR
- "Changing sentence structure of children", L LaBrant - The Elementary English Review, 1934
- "Teaching High-School Students to Write", L LaBrant - English Journal, 1946 - JSTOR
- The uses of communication media, LL LaBrant - M. Willis, 1961
- "An Evaluation of the Free Reading in Grades Ten, Eleven, and Twelve", LL LaBrant - 1936 - Ohio State Univ.
- "An Evaluation of Free Reading in Grades Seven to Twelve, Inclusive", LL LaBrant, FM Heller - Contributions in Education
- "The Content of a Free Reading Program", LL Labrant - 2007 - jstor.org
- "Mental-Health Practices in High-School Grades", L LaBrant - Mental Health in Modern Education
