= Danny Schechter =

American television producer, independent filmmaker, blogger, and media critic

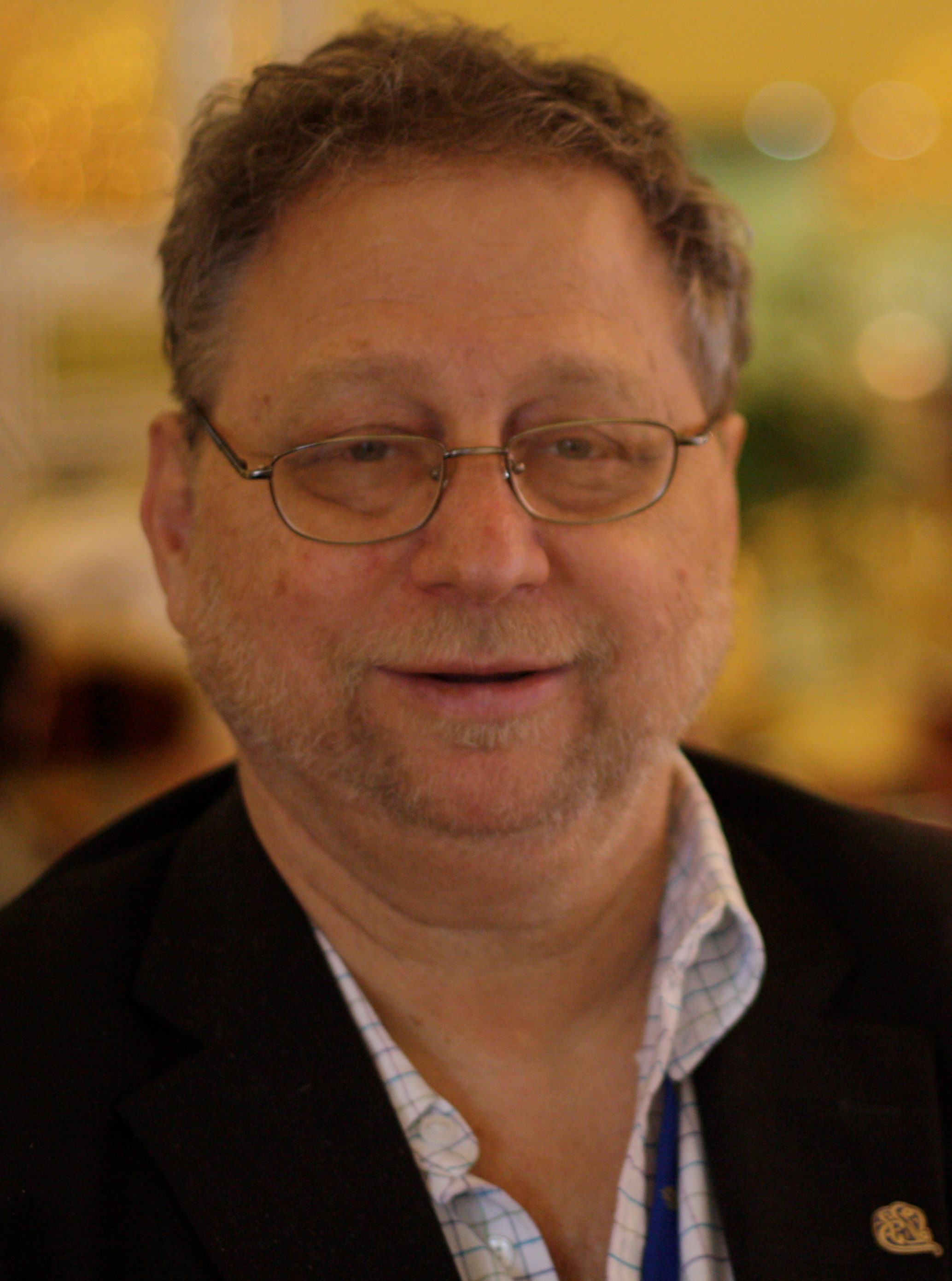
- Schechter in 2009
- Born: Daniel Isaac Schechter; June 27, 1942; New York City, U.S.
- Died: March 19, 2015 (aged 72); New York City, U.S.
- Education: Cornell University (B.A.); London School of Economics (M.A.)
- Occupations: Television producer; filmmaker; media critic; author; professor
- Organization(s): African National Congress, Artists United Against Apartheid
- Movement: Northern Student Movement, anti-apartheid
- Children: Sarah Schechter
- Awards: see awards and honors

Daniel Isaac Schechter (June 27, 1942 – March 19, 2015) was an American television producer, independent filmmaker, blogger, and media critic. He wrote and spoke about many issues including apartheid, civil rights, economics, foreign policy, journalistic control and ethics, and medicine. While attending the London School of Economics in the 1960s, Schechter became an anti-apartheid activist and made trips to South Africa on behalf of the African National Congress (ANC). Later he would help musician Steven Van Zandt assemble other performers to form Artists United Against Apartheid, who released the album Sun City in 1985. Schechter produced and directed six nonfiction films about Nelson Mandela from the time Mandela was a political prisoner to his election and service as President of South Africa.

Schechter's first job in media was with WBCN in Boston, during the 1970s where he became known as "Danny Schechter, the news dissector", a nickname that stuck throughout his life. He continued to work in media with ABC and the start-up cable television news station CNN until he abandoned corporate media and founded TV and film production company Globalvision with his friend and longtime associate Rory O'Connor. Globalvision produced South Africa Now which was a television show that focused on the anti-apartheid struggle and news and culture from South Africa. He authored over 14 books.

== Early life and education ==
Schechter was born in New York City, on June 27, 1942. His mother, Ruth Lisa Schechter (née Lubin), was a secretary and a published poet; his father, Jerry Schechter, was a garment center pattern maker and a sculptor. Grandson of Russian-Jewish immigrant socialists, Schechter grew up in the Bronx, in the garment union-sponsored Amalgamated housing cooperative development.

He attended DeWitt Clinton High School, and graduated in 1964 from Cornell University, where he wrote for The Cornell Daily Sun and was a member of the Quill and Dagger society. He later received a master's degree from the London School of Economics and an honorary doctorate from Fitchburg State University.

== Career ==
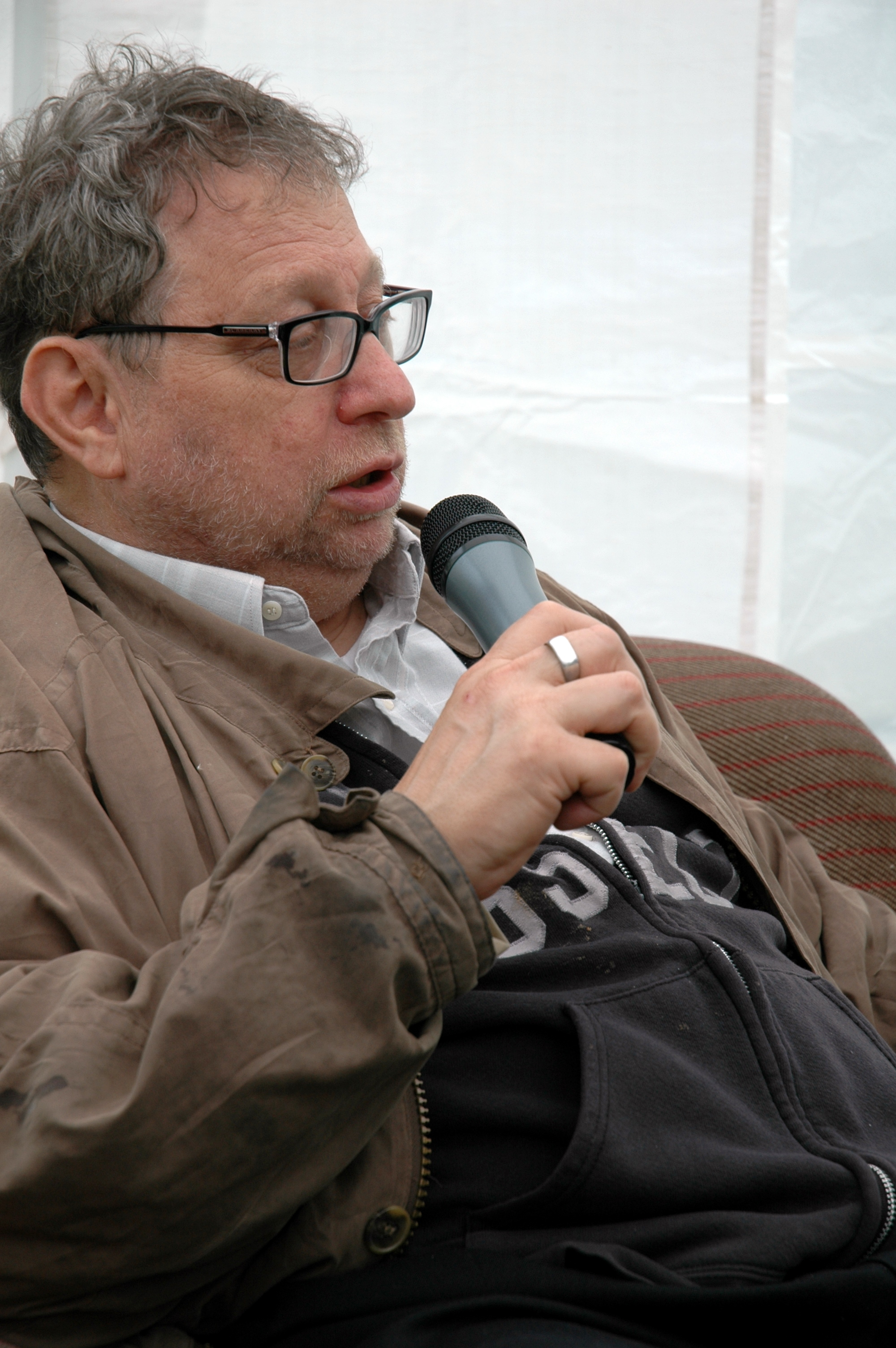
Schechter speaking to a radio station host in Ilmenau, Germany on June 4, 2007

During his time in London, Schechter was a Steering Committee member of the American anti-Vietnam war group The Stop-it Committee. He met Ruth First and other anti-apartheid activists. He joined the African National Congress (ANC) as a part of the organization's "London Recruits", who were tasked with entering South Africa undetected by authorities and conveying communication between exiled members of the ANC and members still in South Africa. While in South Africa Schechter attended the funeral of Albert Lutuli who was the President of the African National Congress from 1952 to 1967.

Schechter was a civil rights worker and the communications director of the Northern Student Movement, and served as a community organizer in a War on Poverty program. He also worked as an assistant to the Mayor of Detroit in 1966.

He was a Nieman Fellow in Journalism at Harvard University, where he taught in 1969, and an adjunct professor at the Graduate School of Journalism at Columbia University.

His media career began at Boston radio station WBCN-FM where he would start his show with the line, "This is Danny Schechter, your news dissector." The nickname was given to him by accident as he was introduced on-air by a colleague as "the news inspector, the news digester, the news dissector." Schechter recalled, 'News dissector' sounded pretty unique and good, so I basically latched onto it." He would eventually rise to the position of news director for WBCN-FM. To Schechter, "dissecting" the news meant he reported the facts of a story, laid the background for the issue, then asserted why media outlets failed to accurately report on the story. Schechter described himself as "a participatory journalist, a down-with-the-movement reporter, a manic media maven." Among his many interviews was one with John Lennon and Yoko Ono in June 1973.

A growing segment of the public wants to be involved with new media. The boom in on-line computer networks and even radio talk shows demonstrates the demand and the need—which the media giants are unlikely to satisfy. Let’s hope that the Congressional watchdogs who are questioning the anti-trust implications of these new monopolies-in-the-making will speak out to preserve public access. In commercial television, everything is slick, but little matters. Its edges may be rough, but public access should matter to us—not only for what it is, but for what it can become."

— Danny Schechter, Newsday (November 3, 1993)

Schechter joined the start-up staff at CNN as a producer and later was a producer for the ABC newsmagazine 20/20, responsible for 50 segments of the program; he won two Emmy Awards and was nominated for two others including for a 1983 investigation of President Reagan's plans to fight and recover from all-out nuclear war co-produced with Bill Lichtenstein.

Schechter assisted musician Steven Van Zandt and record producer Arthur Baker in creating Artists United Against Apartheid, which was a group of musicians who released a protest album in 1985 entitled Sun City.

After working in corporate media, Schechter decided to found Globalvision, a New York City-based TV and film production company, with Rory O'Connor. There, Schechter created and executive-produced the series South Africa Now. According to O'Connor, the Public Broadcasting Service (PBS) declined to distribute the program because of its anti-apartheid advocacy. However, Globalvision circumnavigated PBS and went directly to individual public television stations where it was carried in over 150 markets. Crew for South Africa Now were banned from South Africa itself, which made production more difficult.

Schechter and O'Connor later co-produced Rights & Wrongs: Human Rights Television, which aired on American public TV stations and in over 60 countries from 1992 to 1996. He was the recipient of the Society of Professional Journalists' 2001 Award for Excellence in Documentary Journalism. Schechter's film WMD: Weapons of Mass Deception won the Austin Film Festival's Documentary Film Award in 2004.

From 1999 to 2010, Schechter was also executive editor and "blogger-in-chief" at the now-defunct MediaChannel.org, for which he wrote a nearly-3000-word daily blog on media and society. Known for his sharp criticism of corporate media, Schechter was just as scathing in his opinions of PBS, which rejected several of his ideas for documentaries including an American Masters biography on economist John Kenneth Galbraith.

In 1999, Schechter was approached by Falun Gong spokesperson Gail Rachlin who introduced him to the religion's founder and leader, Li Hongzhi. Subsequently, Rachlin and Schechter co-produced a video designed to promote Falun Gong's message to the general public, with the hope of building interest and support for the movement. Schechter later published Falun Gong's Challenge to China: Spiritual Practice or “Evil Cult”? (2000). Patricia M. Thornton, reviewing the book in The China Quarterly, stated that Schechter's account was “lopsided and unsatisfying”, attributing it partly due to his sympathies and his unfamiliarity with modern Chinese history. She criticized his failure to consider China's media case against Falun Gong, mention the other groups targeted by China crackdown, and to provide sufficient discussion over Falun Gong's beliefs and third-party perspectives. Thornton also wrote the book's main weakness of the book was its "little, if any, critical reflection" but considered it "certainly worth considering" for readers interested in how the crackdown had resulted in human rights violations against thousands of Falun Gong practitioners.

In a 2002 column for Current, Schechter wrote, "PBS is a land of niches and bailiwicks, a Japanese-style employment system topped with execs who seem to have cushy jobs for life if they play it safe. They are thus very risk-averse and barely accountable to the public in whose name they are paid.”

== Death ==
Schechter died of pancreatic cancer on March 19, 2015, in New York City.

=== Awards and honors ===
- 2001 Award for Excellence in Documentary Journalism from the Society of Professional Journalists (for Falun Gong's Challenge to China)
- 2004 Austin Film Festival Documentary Film Award (for WMD: Weapons of Mass Deception)
- 2008 James Aronson Award for Blogging
- Honorary doctorate from Fitchburg State University
- Nieman Fellowship in Journalism at Harvard University
- Two Emmy Awards, four nominations

== Productions ==
=== Film and television ===
Schechter produced and directed many television specials and documentary films, including:

- Beyond A Long Walk To Freedom (2014)
- America's Surveillance State (2014)
- DeWitt Clinton HS: The School That Can Teach Them All, on the fight for Public Education (2013)
- Who Rules America? (2012)
- Plunder: The Crime Of Our Time (2010)
- Barack Obama: The People's President (2009)
- Boob Tube: Sex, TV and Ugly George (2008)
- Viva Madiba (2008)
- A Work in Progress: Danny Schechter and the Journalism of Change (2007)
- In Debt We Trust: America Before The Bubble Burst (2006)
- WMD: Weapons of Mass Deception (2004)
- Counting on Democracy (2004), about the 2000 Florida election recount, narrated by Ossie Davis and Ruby Dee
- We Are Family (2002), about a benefit recording of the Sister Sledge song following the September 11, 2001 attacks; shown at the Sundance Film Festival
- Nkosi: A Voice of Africa's AIDS Orphans (2001), narrated by Danny Glover
- Falun Gong's Challenge to China (2001)
- A Hero for All: Nelson Mandela's Farewell (1999)
- Globalization & Human Rights (1998)
- Beyond Life: Timothy Leary Lives (1997)
- The World of Elie Wiesel (1997)
- Sowing Seeds/Reaping Peace: The World of Seeds of Peace (1996)
- Prisoners of Hope: Reunion on Robben Island (1995), co-directed by Barbara Kopple
- Countdown to Freedom: Ten Days that Changed South Africa (1994), narrated by James Earl Jones and Alfre Woodard
- Sarajevo Ground Zero (1993)
- The Living Canvas (1992), narrated by Billy Dee Williams
- Beyond JFK: The Question of Conspiracy (1992), co-directed by Marc Levin and Barbara Kopple
- Give Peace a Chance (1991)
- Nelson Mandela: Free at Last (1991), PBS national broadcast
- Mandela in America (1990)
- The Making of Sun City (1987)
- Student Power (1968)

=== Books ===
Schechter's books include:

- Surveillance A to Z (Seven Stories Press, 2015, forthcoming). ISBN 978-1609806439
- When South Africa Called, We Answered: How the Media and International Solidarity Helped Topple Apartheid (Cosimo Books, 2015). ISBN 978-1616409418
- Madiba A to Z: The Many Faces of Nelson Mandela (Seven Stories Press, 2013). ISBN 978-1609805593
- Occupy: Dissecting Occupy Wall Street (Cosimo Books, 2012). ISBN 978-1616407162
- Blogothon: Reflections and Revelations from the News Dissector (Cosimo Books, 2012) ISBN 978-1616406691
- The Crime Of Our Time: Why Wall Street is Not Too Big To Jail (Disinformation Books, 2010) ISBN 978-1934708552
- Plunder: Investigating Our Economic Calamity and the Subprime Scandal (Cosimo Books, 2008) ISBN 978-1-60520-351-5
- When News Lies (Select Books, 2006) ISBN 978-1590790731
- The Death of Media (and the Fight to Save Democracy) (Melville House Publishing, 2005). ISBN 978-0-9766583-6-8
- Media Wars: News At A Time of Terror (Rowman & Littlefield, 2003) ISBN 978-0742531093
- Embedded: Weapons of Mass Deception: How the Media Failed to Cover the Iraq War (Prometheus Books, 2003) ISBN 978-1591021735
- News Dissector: Passions, Pieces and Polemics (Akashic Books, 2001) ISBN 978-1888451207
- Falun Gong's Challenge to China: Spiritual Practice or 'Evil Cult'? (Akashic Books, 2000) ISBN 978-1888451139
- The More You Watch, The Less You Know (Seven Stories Press, 1997) ISBN 978-1888363807
