= Rory O'Connor (filmmaker) =

American journalist

- Born: New York, New York
- Education: B.A., Boston College; Fellow, Rutgers University; Fellow, Kennedy School of Government, Harvard University

Rory O'Connor is a journalist, author, educator, and documentary filmmaker. He is co-founder and president of the Globalvision Corporation, and board chair of the Global Center, an affiliated non-profit foundation. His films and television programs have aired on PBS, BBC, NHK, CBS, NBC, ABC, Fox, and numerous other networks. He has been involved in the production of more than two dozen documentaries, and his broadcast, film and print work has been honored with a George Polk Award, a Writer's Guild Award for Outstanding Documentary, an Orwell Award and two Emmys. He has written several books and blogs for the Huffington Post, AlterNet, Al Jazeera and other news sources.

== Career ==
During a ten-year stint in print, culminating as Managing Editor of the Boston-area weekly alternative newspaper The Real Paper, O'Connor began working in broadcast journalism as a reporter and producer at WGBH-TV in Boston. He later worked as a producer and investigator at WCVB-TV, Boston; a Program Producer at WGBH; Executive Producer at Boston's Neighborhood Network News; segment producer at the PBS NewsHour; and Producer at CBS News, before co-founding the independent international media firm Globalvision.

O'Connor and Danny Schechter founded Globalvision, a New York City-based TV and film production company. The company created the series South Africa Now. According to O'Connor, the Public Broadcasting Service (PBS) declined to distribute the program because of its anti-apartheid advocacy. However, Globalvision circumnavigated PBS and went directly to individual public television stations where it was carried in over 150 markets. Crew for South Africa Now were banned from South Africa itself, which made production more difficult.

Schechter and O'Connor later co-produced Rights & Wrongs: Human Rights Television, which aired on American public TV stations and in over 60 countries from 1992 to 1996.

== Awards and honors ==
In 1990, South Africa Now, a public television newsmagazine produced by Globalvision under O'Connor's presidency, won the George Polk Award for broadcast journalism.

== Books ==
- Aaron Cutler (June 1, 2008). Shock Jocks: Hate Speech and Talk Radio: America's Ten Worst Hate Talkers and the Progressive Alternatives. AlterNet Books. pp. 226. ISBN 978-0-9752724-3-5.
- Friends, Followers and the Future: How Social Media are Changing Politics, Threatening Big Brands, and Killing Traditional Media (City Lights, 2012). ISBN 0-87286-556-8
- Nukespeak: The Selling of Nuclear Technology from the Manhattan Project to Fukushima (Sierra Club, Second Edition, 2011). ISBN 978-0140066845

== Filmography ==
2016: Executive Producer, Editorial Consultant "Dead Reckoning," PBS Documentary

2015: Executive Producer “America's Surveillance State,” Independent Documentary

2014: Executive Producer “Who Rules America?” Independent Documentary

2011: Producer, Executive Producer “The Harvest (La Cosecha),” Independent Documentary produced with ShineGlobal

2010: Director, Writer, Co-Producer “The Battle of Durban II: Israel, Palestine and the United Nations,” Independent Documentary produced with Second Generation Films

2010: Executive Producer “Plunder: The Crime of Our Time,” Independent Documentary

2009: Executive Producer “Barack Obama: People's President,” Independent Documentary with Videovision

2008: Executive Producer “Viva Madiba,” Independent Documentary with Videovision

2007: Executive Producer “Frontrunner: The Afghan Woman Who Surprised the World,” Independent Documentary

2006: Executive Producer “911: Press for Truth,” Independent Documentary

2006: Executive-in-Charge-of-Production “In Debt We Trust,” Independent Documentary

2004: Executive Producer “WMD: Weapons of Mass Deception,” Independent Documentary

2003: Co-director, Co-Producer, Writer “The Hole in the Wall,” Independent Documentary

2001: Director, Producer, Writer “Voices of the Poor,” Independent Documentary

2000: Executive-in-Charge-of-Production “Hear Our Voices: The Poor on Poverty,” Global Links TV Documentary

2000: Executive Producer “Falun Gong's Challenge to China,” Independent Documentary

1999: Director, Writer “Richard Speck: Born To Raise Hell,” Court TV Documentary

1999: Story Developer “The Trial of the Chicago 8,” Court TV Documentary

1999: Executive Producer, Writer “Globalization and Human Rights,” PBS Documentary

1998: Director, Producer, Writer “China: Change and Challenge,” Global Links TV Documentary

1998: Executive Producer "A Hero for All,"Independent Documentary with Videovision

1996: Producer “Yellow Wasps: Anatomy Of a War Crime,” Independent Documentary

1994: Executive Producer, Writer “Countdown to Freedom,” Independent Documentary

1993: Director, Producer, Writer “The Arming of Saudi Arabia,” PBS Frontline Documentary

1992: Director, Producer, Writer “BCCI: The Bank of Crooks and Criminals,” PBS Frontline Documentary

1992: Director, Producer, Writer “The Resurrection of Reverend Moon,” PBS Frontline Documentary

1992: Executive Producer “Beyond JFK: The Question of Conspiracy,” Warner Bros. Documentary

1991: Senior Producer "Mandela in America," Time-Warner Documentary

1990: Executive Producer “Nelson Mandela: Free At Last,” PBS Documentary

1990: Producer, Writer “No Place Like Home,” WCVB-TV Documentary

1986: Producer, Writer “Mafia On Trial,” WCVB-TV Documentary

1985: Writer, Producer “No Safe Asylum,” WCVB-TV Documentary
