= The Overspent American =

1998 book

- Author: Juliet Schor
- Subject: American consumerism
- Publisher: Basic Books
- Publication date: 1998
- Pages: 241

The Overspent American: Upscaling, Downshifting, and the New Consumer is a 1998 book by Juliet Schor on American consumer spending patterns.

== Bibliography ==
- George, David (1998). "Review of The Overspent American: Upscaling, Downshifting, and the New Consumer". Review of Social Economy. 56 (4): 554–557. doi:10.1080/00346769800000052. ISSN 0034-6764. JSTOR 29769983.
- Kilborn, Peter T. (June 21, 1998). "Splurge". The New York Times. ISSN 0362-4331.
- Knoedler, Janet T. (1999). "Review of The Overspent American: Upscaling, Downshifting, and the New Consumer". Journal of Economic Issues. 33 (3): 747–750. doi:10.1080/00213624.1999.11506198. ISSN 0021-3624. JSTOR 4227481.
- "Rev. of The Overspent American". Kirkus Reviews. April 15, 1998.
- Stihler, Ariane (September 2000). "Juliet B. Schor: The Overspent American. Upscaling, Downshifting, and the New Consumer. New York: Basic Books, 1998". Journal of Consumer Policy. 23 (3): 341–347. doi:10.1023/A:1007159024596. ISSN 1573-0700. S2CID 150561017.
