= New Dream =

US nonprofit organization

New Dream, formerly recognized as The Center for a New American Dream, was a non-profit organization dedicated to empowering individuals, communities, and organizations to adopt consumption practices that enhance well-being for both people and the planet. It stopped operations in 2020.

== Overview ==
The organization collaborates with individuals and communities to address the commercialization of culture, promote community involvement, and preserve natural resources. New Dream advocates against the adverse impacts of commercialism and excessive consumption, aiming to shift societal norms surrounding consumption and consumer behavior. They support individuals and communities striving for lifestyle changes and collective actions. New Dream's overarching objective is to foster behavioral change, shift attitudes, and reshape social norms to decrease consumption, strengthen community ties, and enhance overall well-being.

The organization emphasizes sustainability and the promotion of non-material values. One of New Dream's objectives is to encourage a cultural shift away from a focus on accumulation towards prioritizing what holds significance. While individuals determine their own priorities, New Dream suggests emphasizing aspects such as time, nature, family, community, fairness, and enjoyment over material possessions. The organization's informal slogan is "More Fun, Less Stuff."

In essence, New Dream aims to foster a vision of life that transcends overconsumption, disposable habits, and constant marketing. It offers resources to assist families, individuals, educators, and advocates in curbing consumerism both personally and within society at large.

== Programs ==
New Dream operates within three main program areas:

SoKind Registry: This initiative offers an "alternative gift registry" platform, enabling users to create registries or wishlists emphasizing enjoyable experiences, quality time with loved ones, and contributions towards meaningful causes.

Kids & Commercialism: This program provides practical advice for fostering non-commercial environments and activities for children, empowering individuals to enact lasting positive changes in the lives of the children they care for.

Simplify the Holidays: New Dream promotes a focus on "more of what matters" during the holiday season by offering creative gift suggestions and simplification strategies. The aim is to help individuals prioritize meaningful connections and joy over stress, excess, and expenditure.

== History ==
Founded in 1997, the Center for a New American Dream initiated a significant national dialogue on materialism, achieving balance in life, and the often overlooked consequences of a society characterized by high consumption. Its distinctive emphasis on the connections between consumption patterns, environmental impact, and overall well-being set it apart from other environmental and social justice organizations. The center ceased operations in September 2020.

In 2017, the Center for a New American Dream underwent a strategic reorganization and rebranding effort aimed at enhancing program efficiency and aligning with the evolving needs of its expanding audience. The organization adopted the name New Dream and currently operates as a Joint Plan of Work Partner of Virginia Organizing, a tax-exempt organization that accepts donations on behalf of New Dream.

On September 30, 2020, New Dream announced its closure as an independent nonprofit organization. However, it continues to collaborate with various community partners despite discontinuing its standalone operations. New Dream had been active for nearly 25 years prior to its closure.

The organization proposed that American-style consumerism and the pursuit of the "American Dream" have contributed significantly to the normalization of high-consumption lifestyles. The name update reflects the organization's broader mission to assist individuals and communities globally in reducing consumerism and materialism.
