= William D. Lutz =

American linguist (born 1940)

- Born: December 12, 1940 (age 85); Racine, Wisconsin
- Education: Dominican College of Racine, Marquette University, University of Nevada, Reno
- Scientific career
- Fields: Linguistics
- Workplaces: Rutgers University-Camden

William D. Lutz (/lʌts/; born December 12, 1940) is an American linguist who specializes in the use of plain language and the avoidance of doublespeak (deceptive language). He wrote an essay The World of Doublespeak on this subject as well as the book Doublespeak His original essay and the book described the four different types of doublespeak (euphemism, jargon, gobbledygook, and inflated language) and the social dangers of doublespeak.

== Biography ==
In 1962, Lutz received his bachelor's degree from the Dominican College of Racine (which closed its doors in 1974). He received his master's degree in English from Marquette University in 1963 and his doctorate in 1971 from the University of Nevada, Reno. Lutz began teaching English at Rutgers University-Camden in 1971, and was made a full professor in 1991. He retired from teaching in 2006.

From 1980 to 1994, Lutz edited the now defunct Quarterly Review of Doublespeak. He worked as a consultant with a number of corporations and the United States government to promote the use of 'plain language'. For example, he was a significant contributor to the SEC's Plain English Handbook.

== Selected publications ==
External videos
- Booknotes interview with Lutz on Doublespeak, December 31, 1989, C-SPAN
- Presentation by Lutz on The New Doublespeak, August 6, 1996, C-SPAN

- (1974) The Age of Communication
- (1989) Doublespeak: From "Revenue Enhancement" to "Terminal Living"
- (1994) The Cambridge Thesaurus of American English
- (1996) The New Doublespeak: Why No One Knows What Anyone's Saying Anymore
- (1999) Doublespeak Defined: Cut Through the Bull**** and Get the Point
