= National Council of Teachers of English =

American teaching organization

- Formation: 1911
- Type: Professional association
- Headquarters: Champaign, Illinois, U.S.
- Location: United States
- Executive Director: Emily Kirkpatrick
- Website: www.ncte.org

The National Council of Teachers of English (NCTE) is a United States professional organization supposedly dedicated to "improving the teaching and learning of English and the language arts at all levels of education. Since 1911, NCTE has provided a forum for the profession, an array of opportunities for teachers to continue their professional growth throughout their careers, and a framework for cooperation to deal with issues that affect the teaching of English," although the recent de-chartering of the Conference on College Composition and Communication casts doubt on their commitment to college-level instruction. In addition, the NCTE describes its mission as follows:

The Council promotes the development of literacy, the use of language to construct personal and public worlds and to achieve full participation in society, through the learning and teaching of English and the related arts and sciences of language.

The NCTE is involved in publishing journals (such as College English) and books that address the concerns of English language arts educators. Since the 1970s, it has issued annual Doublespeak Awards and Orwell Awards. It also issues the NCTE Intellectual Freedom Award while concurrently requiring leadership of interest groups to sign Non-Disclosure Agreements.

== History ==
As stated on the official NCTE website, the National Council of Teachers of English was founded in 1911 by a group of educators in Chicago, Illinois, known as the English Round Table of the National Education Association. This group wanted to create a professional response to changing needs and values regarding education, particularly English language education. The impetus for this early effort was a concern that school curricula were becoming too narrow and were incapable of addressing the needs of an increasingly diverse student population. A special committee was formed to address these issues. Since this time the NCTE has provided a forum for English teaching professionals to continue their professional growth throughout their careers, in addition to providing a framework for cooperative action pertaining to issues that affect the instruction of English.

These concerned educators at first set themselves a limited task: to explore the problems arising from a rigid, narrowly defined approach to English language instruction. Soon, however, it became apparent that more was needed, and that only a national professional organization would have the ability to affect policy decisions.

By 1919, the original investigatory committee had grown large enough to become such an organization. Because of its open-door policy regarding membership, the NCTE from the first maintained a divisional structure, with separate groups representing groups based on grade levels, divided up into elementary, secondary, and postsecondary educators.

By 1948, the simple divisions based on grade level were inadequate, and the Conference on College Composition and Communication (CCCC) was formed to address the special needs of communication and composition teachers at the university and community college level. This reliance on committee organization proved to be extremely useful, for it permitted interested groups to concentrate their focus on particular issues or trends. Membership grew dramatically in the second half of the twentieth century, and over the years new committees were formed, leading to the five-conference structure in place at the beginning of the twenty-first century.

In 1954, the organization's president was Lou L. LaBrant, who lived to be 103 and taught for 70 years.

=== Structure ===
NCTE offers its members opportunities to grow professionally by interacting with colleagues in all sides of English teaching. Individuals belong to any of four broad sections of membership – Elementary, Middle, Secondary or College. They may also join other groups centered on various teaching specialties within English, each with its own journal, meetings, and projects.

Major interest groups, called Conferences, serve teachers of college writing and rhetoric; teacher educators in higher education and in-service posts; teachers with an interest in whole language; and English department chairs, K-12 supervisors, and other English instruction leaders. Assemblies are informal special interest groups, ranging in focus from computers in English to research, which meet at NCTE conventions. A notable example of this last sort of group is the Children's Literature Assembly, which publishes the Journal of Children's Literature.

Commissions monitor and report on trends and issues in the teaching of language, composition, literature, reading, and media. Nearly 50 committees and task forces carry out projects on issues and topics in the teaching of English, among them testing and evaluation, censorship, instructional technology, response to literature, teacher preparation and certification, and English in urban schools.

In addition to commissions, standing committees are charged with focusing on issues and/or areas of continued concern that affect the English language area of study. There are three standing committees; the committee against censorship, the committee on diversity and inclusivity, and the committee on global citizenship.

=== Committee Against Censorship ===
The committee against censorship's charge is "to solicit and receive reports of censorship incidents from NCTE members, constituent groups, and sources outside the Council; to serve as a resource on current patterns of censorship; to continue to raise awareness of censorship issues; to serve as an advisory committee to NCTE Headquarters considering the kinds of support and services that an Intellectual Freedom/Anti-Censorship Center could provide; to promote policies for literature adoption that allay the possibility of censorship; to help NCTE develop rationales for the teaching of controversial texts, and to develop a white paper that further explores students' right to write and all of its implications.

=== Committee on Diversity and Inclusivity ===
The committee on diversity and inclusivity's charge is to "advise NCTE on efforts to foster diversity and inclusivity among members and potential members, including (but not restricted to) in terms of race, ethnicity, sex and gender identity, age, economic status, physical ability, and teaching circumstances. Work in concert with the Executive Committee and Executive Director on specific assignments that ensure equity and diversity within membership. Identify strategies to employ the resources and values of diversity and inclusivity to advance NCTE's mission for all members, our students, and our constituencies. Provide annual or biannual analyses of the effectiveness of NCTE diversity and inclusivity initiatives (programs, awards, events, etc.), and to make recommendations based on that analysis. Identify existing research or resources that can support a diverse NCTE membership and their professional needs. Identify gaps or opportunities that might be met with new research or resources."

=== Committee on Global Citizenship ===
The committee on global citizenship's charge is "to promote interest and knowledge of global connections and issues across the Council, including convention sessions, publications, social media, and Council projects; To promote discussions of the learning needs of students in schools and colleges who come from global contexts and of instructional strategies for teachers of these students; To encourage discussions of the teaching of English and world Englishes in global contexts as well as in North American schools and colleges with increasingly globally diverse students; To provide awareness of literacy education in global contexts in order to provide a mutual exchange of pedagogical ideas and issues; To encourage the integration of global and international literature and of strategies for intercultural understanding within schools and colleges; and to engage the Council in an exploration of the changing needs of literacy teaching and learning in an increasingly global society and as members of a broader global community."

=== Awards ===
The NCTE offers several awards for organizations performing work consistent with NCTE's mission. These awards include:

- Children's Book and Poetry Awards
- Diversity Awards
- Educator Awards
- Leadership Awards
- Research Awards
- Student Writing Awards
- Publication Awards

== Strategic governance ==
In November 2003, the NCTE Executive Committee adopted a new model of policy-oriented style of governance for the council. They studied the meaning and ramifications of issues for the organization as a whole.

== Journals ==
NCTE published the following journals:

- College Composition and Communication, which they abandoned when they de-chartered the Conference on College Composition and Communication in 2026
- College English
- English Education, journal of English language arts teacher educators
- English Journal
- English Leadership Quarterly, journal of the Conference on English Leadership
- FORUM: Issues about Part-Time and Contingent Faculty, sponsored by the Conference on College Composition and Communication
- Language Arts
- Research in the Teaching of English
- Talking Points, journal of literacies and languages for all
- Teaching English in the Two-Year College
- Voices from the Middle, journal of the Middle Level Section

=== Teaching English in the Two-Year College ===
Teaching English in the Two-Year College
- Discipline: English teaching
- Language: English
- Edited by: Holly Hassel

Publication details
- History: 1974-present
- Publisher: National Council of Teachers of English (United States)
- Frequency: Quarterly

Standard abbreviations
- ISO 4: Teach. Engl. Two-Year Coll.

Indexing
- ISSN: 0098-6291
- LCCN: 74648396
- OCLC no.: 290983153

Links
- Journal homepage; Online access; Online archive

Teaching English in the Two-Year College is an official publication of the council and is aimed at teachers and scholars in two-year colleges. The peer-reviewed academic journal covers a range of topics related to the teaching of English language arts at the college level, including all areas of composition (basic, first-year, and advanced); business, technical, and creative writing; and the teaching of literature, along with other areas of professional concern. It sometimes publishes special issues devoted to specific themes. It is abstracted and indexed by EBSCO databases and the Modern Language Association. It was established in 1973 and the following persons are or have been editors-in-chief:

- Ruth Shaw and Keats Sparrow (co-editors, 1974–1975)
- Keats Sparrow and Frieda Purvis (co-editors)
- Bertie Fearing and John Hutchens (1980–1987)
- Nell Ann Pickett (1988–1994)
- Mark Reynolds (1994–2001)
- Howard Tinberg (2001–2006)
- Jeff Sommers (2006–2016)
- Holly Hassel (2016–2020)
- Darin Jensen (2020–2026)
- Cheryl Hogue Smith and Jessica Nastal (2026-present)

== Political activities ==
NCTE is engaged in a variety of political issues affecting English Education and does so primarily through Steering Committee on Social and Political Concerns (SLATE). According to the NCTE website, SLATE attempts to "influence public attitudes and policy decisions affecting the teaching of English language arts at local, state, and national levels; to implement and publicize the policies adopted by NCTE. As part of its political action function, SLATE will serve as NCTE's intellectual freedom network."

=== NCTE and SLATE ===
NCTE and Slate are involved in many political issues, some of which include:

- No Child Left Behind Act (NCLB)
- Banned Books
- Striving Readers Act

== Present and future ==
The NCTE currently has a reported 35,000 members and subscribers in the United States and internationally. This membership is composed of teachers and supervisors of English programs ranging from elementary, middle, and secondary schools to faculty in college and university English departments as well as teacher educators, local and state agency English specialists, and other professionals in directly related fields. Sponsoring over 120 regional, state, provincial, local, and student affiliates within the United States, Canada, and Asian countries, the NCTE continues its rapid annual growth.

== See also ==
- Composition studies
- English studies
- Donald H. Graves
- National Day on Writing
- College Composition and Communication
