= List of autobiographies =

The following is a list of notable autobiographies:

== By profession ==
Author	Title of book	Year
Aerospace
Manfred von Richthofen	The Red Fighter Pilot	1917
Billy Bishop	Winged Warfare	1918
James McCudden	Five Years in the Royal Flying Corps	1919
René Fonck	My Fights (Mes Combats)	1919
Richard E. Byrd	Skyward	1928
Clarence Chamberlin	Record Flights	1928
Frank Hawks	Speed	1931
Willy Coppens	Days Gone: Memories (Jours Envolés: Mémoires) (Note: Published in English as Days on the Wing in 1934 and Flying In Flanders in 1971.)	1932
Amelia Earhart	The Fun of It	1933
Duncan Grinnell-Milne	Wind in the Wires	1933
C. W. A. Scott	C. W. A. Scott's Book: The Life and Mildenhall-Melbourne Flight of C.W.A. Scott	1934
Beirne Lay Jr.	I Wanted Wings	1937
Frank Glasgow Tinker	Some Still Live	1938
Louise Thaden	High, Wide and Frightened	1938
Igor Sikorsky	The Story of the Winged-S	1939
Richard Hillary	The Last Enemy	1940
Beryl Markham	West with the Night	1942
Ted W. Lawson	Thirty Seconds Over Tokyo	1943
Don S. Gentile	One Man Air Force	1944
Guy Gibson	Enemy Coast Ahead	1946
Arthur Harris	Bomber Offensive	1947
Bert Stiles	Serenade to the Big Bird	1947
Henry H. Arnold	Global Mission	1949
Claire Lee Chennault	Way of a Fighter: The Memoirs of Claire Lee Chennault	1949
George Kenney	General Kenney Reports: A Personal History of the Pacific War	1949
Ivan Kozhedub	I Serve the Motherland (Служу Родине)	1949
Hans-Ulrich Rudel	Nevertheless (Trotzdem) (Note: This would later be re-edited and published in English as Stuka Pilot.)	1949
Dick Grace	Visibility Unlimited	1950
William Bushnell Stout	So Away I Went!	1951
Pierre Clostermann	The Big Show (Le Grand Cirque)	1951
Hanna Reitsch	Flying is My Life (Fliegen, Mein Leben)	1951
Adolf Galland	The First and the Last	1953
Ernst Heinkel	Stormy Life (Stürmisches Leben)	1953
Heinz Knoke	I Flew for the Führer	1953
Hugh Henry Home Popham	Sea Flight: A Fleet Air Arm Pilot's Story	1954
Nevil Shute	Slide Rule: Autobiography of an Engineer	1954
Bill Bridgeman	The Lonely Sky	1955
Eino Luukkanen	Fighter Over Finland (Hävittäjälentäjänä Kahdessa Sodassa)	1956
Johnnie Johnson	Wing Leader	1956
John Slessor	The Central Blue: Recollections and Reflections	1956
Basil Embry	Mission Completed (Note: A previous book, Wingless Victory (alternately known as Alone He Went), was published in 1950. However, it was it was "written by an R.A.F. colleague of Embry's, and thus [does not have] the personal touch of autobiography" according to a review.)	1957
Saburō Sakai	Samurai!	1957
Pappy Boyington	Baa Baa Black Sheep	1958
Robert S. Johnson	Thunderbolt!	1958
Alan Deere	Nine Lives	1959
Albert Scott Crossfield	Always Another Dawn: The Story of a Rocket Test Pilot	1960
Eric Brown	Wings on My Sleeve	1961
Geoffrey de Havilland	Sky Fever: The Autobiography of Sir Geoffrey de Havilland	1961
John Braham	Night Fighter	1961
Nancy Bird	Born to Fly	1961
Bud Mahurin	Honest John	1962
Arch Whitehouse	The Fledgling: An Autobiography	1964
Curtis LeMay	Mission with LeMay: My Story	1965
Arthur Tedder	With Prejudice: The War Memoirs of Marshal of the Royal Air Force, Lord Tedder	1966
Eddie Rickenbacker	Rickenbacker: An Autobiography	1967
Alexander Sergeyevich Yakovlev	The Purpose of Life (Цель жизни)	1967
Benjamin Foulois	From the Wright Brothers to the Astronauts: The Memoirs of Benjamin D. Foulois	1968
George William Goddard	Overview: A Lifelong Adventure in Aerial Photography	1969
Francis Gary Powers	Operation Overflight: The U-2 Spy Pilot Tells His Story for the First Time	1970
Raymond Collishaw	Air Command: A Fighter Pilot's Story	1973
Donald Wilson	Wooing Peponi: My Odyssey through Many Years	1973
Jan Zumbach	Mister Brown (Note: Published in English as On Wings of War: My Life as a Pilot Adventurer in 1975.)	1973
Arthur Lee	No Parachute: A Fighter Pilot in World War I	1974
Cecil Arthur Lewis	Never Look Back: An Attempt at Autobiography	1974
Igor Kaberov	Swastika in the Gunsight (В прицеле свастика)	1975
Alexander Lippisch	A Triangle Flies: The Development of Delta Aircraft Until 1945 (Ein Dreieck Fliegt: Die Entwicklung der Delta-Flugzeuge bis 1945) (Note: Published in English as The Delta Wing: History and Development in 1981.)	1976
Charles Lamb	War in a Stringbag	1977
Alan Cobham	A Time to Fly	1978
Alex Henshaw	Sigh for a Merlin: Testing the Spitfire (Note: The author published two additional books: The Flight of the Mew Gull in 1980 and Wings Across the Great Divide: Postwar Flying in Africa in the 1940s in 2004. They cover his prewar and postwar life, respectively.)	1979
Murray Peden	A Thousand Shall Fall	1979
Jean Batten	Alone in the Sky	1979
George Gay	Sole Survivor	1980
Wladek Gnyś	First Kill: A Fighter Pilot's Autobiography	1981
William R. Dunn	Fighter Pilot: The First American Ace of World War II	1982
Robert Mason	Chickenhawk (Note: The author published an additional book: Chickenhawk: Back in the World: Life After Vietnam in 1993.)	1983
Charles R. Bond Jr.	A Flying Tiger's Diary	1984
Duke Cunningham	Fox Two: The Story of America's First Ace in Vietnam	1984
Gerhard Neumann	Herman the German: Enemy Alien U.S. Army Master Sergeant	1984
Stanley Hooker	Not Much of an Engineer	1985
Al Mooney	The Al Mooney Story: They All Fly Through the Same Air	1985
Chuck Yeager	Yeager: An Autobiography	1985
Roald Dahl	Going Solo	1986
Haywood S. Hansell	The Strategic Air War Against Germany and Japan: A Memoir	1986
Jackie Cochran	Jackie Cochran: An Autobiography	1987
Alberto Briganti	Beyond the Clouds the Serene: Memories of Forty Years of Flight and Adventure (Oltre le Nubi il Sereno: Ricordi di Quarant'anni di Volo e di Avventura)	1988
Samuel Hynes	Flights of Passage: Recollections of a World War II Aviator	1988
Robert Lee Scott Jr.	The Day I Owned the Sky (Note: An earlier memoir was published as God is My Co-Pilot.)	1988
Fred Weick	From the Ground Up	1988
John Thomas Blackburn	The Jolly Rogers: The Story of Tom Blackburn and Navy Fighting Squadron VF-17	1989
Takeo Doi	Fifty Years Recollections on Aircraft Design (航空機設計50年の回想)	1989
Hugh Dundas	Flying Start: A Fighter Pilot's War Years	1989
Kelly Johnson	Kelly: More Than My Share of It All	1989
Boone Guyton	Whistling Death: The Test Pilot's Story of the F4U Corsair	1990
Bud Anderson	To Fly and Fight	1991
Jimmy Doolittle	I Could Never Be So Lucky Again	1991
Gabby Gabreski	Gabby: A Fighter Pilot's Life	1991
Hajo Herrmann	Eagle's Wings	1991
Brian Shul	Sled Driver: Flying the World's Fastest Jet	1991
Joe Foss	A Proud American: The Autobiography of Joe Foss	1992
Tex Johnson	Tex Johnston: Jet-Age Test Pilot	1992
Harry H. Crosby	A Wing and a Prayer: The "Bloody 100th" Bomb Group of the U.S. Eighth Air Force in Action over Europe in World War II	1993
Lawrence A. Hyland	Call Me Pat: The Autobiography of the Man Howard Hughes Chose to Lead Hughes Aircraft	1993
Diana Barnato Walker	Spreading My Wings: One of Britain's Top Women Pilots Tells Her Remarkable Story	1994
Marion Eugene Carl	Pushing the Envelope: The Career of Fighter Ace and Test Pilot Marion Carl	1994
Neal Vernon Loving	Lovings Love: A Black American's Experiences in Aviation	1994
Ben Rich	Skunk Works: A Personal Memoir of My Years at Lockheed	1994
Bob Hoover	Forever Flying: Fifty Years of High-flying Adventures, From Barnstorming in Prop Planes to Dogfighting Germans to Testing Supersonic Jets	1996
No Kum-Sok	A MiG-15 to Freedom: Memoir of the Wartime North Korean Defector Who First Delivered the Secret Fighter Jet to the Americans in 1953	1996
Charles W. Dryden	A-Train: Memoirs of a Tuskegee Airman	1997
James V. Hartinger	From One Stripe to Four Stars	1997
Frank E. Petersen	Into the Tiger's Jaw: America's First Black Marine Aviator	1998
Paul Tibbets	Return of The Enola Gay	1998
Jeffrey Quill	Spitfire: A Test Pilot's Story	1998
Michael J. Novosel	Dustoff: The Memoir of an Army Aviator	1999
Gene Kranz	Failure Is Not an Option: Mission Control from Mercury to Apollo 13 and Beyond	2000
Frederick Libby	Horses Don't Fly: A Memoir of World War I	2000
Roland Beamont	The Years Flew Past: 40 Years at the Leading Edge of Aviation	2001
Robert K. Morgan	The Man Who Flew the Memphis Belle: Memoir of a WWII Bomber Pilot	2001
Peter Masefield	Flight Path: The Autobiography of Sir Peter Masefield	2002
Donald L. Mallick	Smell of Kerosene: A Test Pilot's Odyssey	2003
Bernard F. Fisher	Beyond the Call of Duty: The Story of an American Hero	2004
Clayton Kelly Gross	Live Bait: WWII Memories of an Undefeated Fighter Ace	2006
Günther Rall	My Logbook: Reminiscences, 1938-2006	2006
Joe Sutter	747: Creating the World's First Jumbo Jet and Other Adventures from a Life in Aviation	2006
Jack Broughton	Rupert Red Two: A Fighter Pilot's Life from Thunderbolts to Thunderchiefs (Note: The author wrote two previous books Thud Ridge in 1968 and Going Downtown: The War Against Hanoi and Washington in 1988.)	2007
Leland Snow	Putting Dreams to Flight	2008
Anna Yegorova	Red Sky, Black Death: A Soviet Woman Pilot's Memoir of the Eastern Front	2009
Ann B. Carl	A WASP Among Eagles: A Woman Military Test Pilot in World War II	2000 (Note: It is not clear when this book was first published. An edition was published by the Smithsonian Institution in 2010. However, her 2008 obituary mentions the work by name. A WorldCat entry with limited details mentions an edition published in 2000. This date has been used for the entry.)
Mitsuo Fuchida	For That One Day: The Memoirs of Mitsuo Fuchida, the Commander of the Attack on Pearl Harbor	2011
Harold Brown	Keep Your Airspeed Up: The Story of a Tuskegee Airman	2017
Norman Kleiss	Never Call Me a Hero: A Legendary American Dive-Bomber Pilot Remembers the Battle of Midway	2017
Tammie Jo Shults	Nerves of Steel: How I Followed My Dreams, Earned My Wings, and Faced My Greatest Challenge	2019
Anthropology
Margaret Mead	Blackberry Winter: My Earlier Years	1972
Archaeology
Margaret Murray	My First Hundred Years with Ammu	1963
Architecture
Frank Lloyd Wright	Autobiography	1943
Art
Salvador Dalí	The Secret Life of Salvador Dalí	1942
Claude Monet	An Interview	1900
Gwen Raverat	Period Piece	1952
Business
Andrew Carnegie	Autobiography of Andrew Carnegie: with Illustrations	1920
Henry Ford	My Life and Work	1922
Richard DeVos	Simply Rich: Life and Lessons from the Cofounder of Amway: A Memoir	2014
Andrew S. Grove	A Memoir: Swimming Across	2001
Comedy
Terry-Thomas	Filling the Gap	1959
Harpo Marx	Harpo Speaks	1961
Charlie Chaplin	My Autobiography	1964
Moe Howard	Moe Howard and the Three Stooges, AKA I Came, I Stooged, I Conquered (published posthumously)	1974
Sid Caesar	Where Have I Been?	1982
Kenny Everett	The Custard Stops at Hatfield	1982
Bill Cosby	Fatherhood	1986
J. B. Boothroyd	A Shoulder To Laugh On	1987
Mel Blanc	That's NOT All, Folks	1988
Gilda Radner	It's Always Something	1989
Richard Pryor	Pryor Convictions	1995
Betty White	BW: In Person and Here We Go Again: My Life In Television	both 1995
Damon Wayans	Bootleg	1996
Stephen Fry	Moab Is My Washpot	1997
Jenny McCarthy	Jen-X: My Open Book	1997
Chris Rock	Rock This	1997
Sandra Bernhard	Confessions of a Pretty Lady	1998
Danny Bonaduce	Random Acts of Badness	2001
Fran Drescher	Cancer Schmancer	2002
Alan Thicke	How Men Have Babies: a New Father's Survival Guide	2003
Rodney Dangerfield	It's Not Easy Being Me: a Lifetime of No Respect But Plenty of Sex and Drugs (published posthumously)	2004
Tom Green	Hollywood Causes Cancer	2004
Rik Mayall	Bigger than Hitler – Better than Christ	2005
Tommy Chong	The I Chong: Meditations From the Joint	2006
Bob Newhart	I Shouldn't Even Be Doing This!	2006
Alan Thicke	How to Raise Kids Who Won't Hate You	2006
Steve Martin	Born Standing Up	2007
Denis Leary	Why We Suck	2008
Stephen Fry	Ernie: The Autobiography	2009
Frankie Boyle	My Shit Life So Far	2009
Craig Ferguson	American on Purpose	2009
Todd Bridges	Killing Willis, AKA Thatswhatimtalkinbout	2010
Gilbert Gottfried	Rubber Balls & Liquor	2011
Michael Moore	Here Comes Trouble	2011
Victoria Jackson	Is My Bow Too Big? How I Went from SNL to the Tea Party	2012
Kevin Smith	Tough Sh*t: Life Advice from a Fat, Lazy Slob Who Still Made Good	2012
Jimmie Walker	Dyn-o-mite!	2012
Andrew Dice Clay	The Filthy Truth	2014
Andrew Sachs	I Know Nothing (But Here's What I've Learned)	2014
John Cleese	So, Anyway...	2014
Bob Saget	Dirty Daddy	2014
David Jason	Only Fools and Stories	2017
Cheech Marin	Cheech Is Not My Real Name...But Don't Call Me Chong!	2017
Eric Idle	Always Look On the Bright Side Of Life	2018
Mel Brooks	All About Me: My Remarkable Life In Show Business	2021
Cassandra Peterson	Yours Cruelly, Elvira	2021
Dance
Isadora Duncan	My Life	1927
Suzanne Farrell	Holding Onto the Air	1990
Derek Hough	Taking the Lead: Lessons from a Life in Motion	2014
Russ Tamblyn	Dancing On the Edge: A Journey of Living, Loving, and Tumbling Through Hollywood	2024
Drama
Vincent Price	I Like What I Know	1959
Fred Astaire	Steps in Time	1960
Ken Murray	Life On a Pogo Stick	1960
George Sanders	Memoirs of a Professional Cad	1960
Sir Cedric Hardwicke	A Victorian in Orbit	1961
Dick Gregory	Nigger	1964
Brian Aherne	A Proper Job	1969
Veronica Lake	VL: the Autobiography	1970
Orson Bean	Me and the Orgone	1971
David Niven	The Moon's a Balloon	1972
Kim Hunter	Loose in the Kitchen	1975
Robert Mitchum	It Sure Beats Working	1975
David Niven	Bring On The Empty Horses	1975
Joyce Grenfell	Joyce Grenfell Requests the Pleasure	1976
Christopher Lee	Tall, Dark & Gruesome	1977
Peter Ustinov	Dear Me	1977
Gregory Peck	An Actor's Life	1978
Ralph Bellamy	When the Smoke Hit the Fan	1979
Dale Evans & Roy Rogers	Happy Trails	1979
John Gielgud	An Actor and His Time	1979
Bette Midler	A View From a Broad	1980
Ricardo Montalbán	Reflections: a Life In Two Worlds	1980
Robert Stack	Straight Shooting	1980
Henry Fonda	Fonda: My Life, AKA How Did I Get to Golden Pond?	1981
Mercedes McCambridge	The Quality of Mercy	1981
James Mason	Before I Forget	1982
Satyajit Ray	Jakhan Choto Chilam	1982
Dirk Bogarde	An Orderly Man	1983
James Fox	Comeback: an Actor's Direction	1983
Akira Kurosawa	Something Like an Autobiography	1983
Laurence Olivier	Confessions of an Actor	1983
Roman Polanski	Roman by Polanski	1984
Mr. T	The Man With the Gold	1984
Brooke Shields	On Your Own	1985
Alec Guinness	Blessings in Disguise	1986
Laurence Olivier	On Acting	1986
Franco Zeffirelli	Zeffirelli: an Autobiography	1986
Ingmar Bergman	The Magic Lantern	1987
Patty Duke	Call Me Anna	1987
Arthur Miller	Timebends: A Life	1987
Mamie Van Doren	Playing the Field: Sex, Stardom, Love, and Life in Hollywood	1987
Orson Bean	Too Much Is Not Enough	1988
Chuck Norris	The Secret of Inner Strength: My Story	1988
Terence Stamp	Coming Attractions	1988
Drew Barrymore	Little Girl Lost	1989
Charles Grodin	It Would Be So Nice If You Weren't Here: My Journey Through Show Business	1989
Patrick Macnee	Blind in One Ear	1989
Wayne Newton	Once Before I Go	1989
Tony Randall	Which Reminds Me	1989
Cornel Wilde	Wildelife (published posthumously)	1989
Macdonald Carey	The Days of My Life	1991
Michael York	Accidentally on Purpose	1991
Katharine Hepburn	Me: Stories of My Life	1991
Patty Duke	A Brilliant Madness	1992
Peter O'Toole	Loitering with Intent: The Child	1992
Barry Williams	Growing Up Brady OR I Was a Teenage Greg	1992
Richard Fleischer	Just Tell Me When to Cry	1993
James Earl Jones	Voices and Silences	1993
Jeremy Lloyd	Listen Very Carefully, I Shall Say This Only Once	1993
Ann-Margret	My Story	1994
David Cassidy	C'mon, Get Happy: Fear and Loathing On the Partridge Family Bus	1994
Buddy Ebsen	The Other Side of Oz	1994
Sheldon Leonard	And the Show Goes On	1994
Burgess Meredith	So Far, So Good	1994
Nichelle Nichols	Beyond Uhura	1994
Burt Reynolds	My Life, AKA Smokey and I	1994
George Takei	To the Stars	1994
Adam West	Back To the Batcave	1994
Loni Anderson	My Life in High Heels	1995
Marlon Brando	Songs My Mother Taught Me	1995
Kelsey Grammer	So Far...	1995
Charlton Heston	In the Arena	1995
Garry Marshall	Wake Me When It's Funny	1995
Mary Tyler Moore	After All: How I Made It Despite Everything	1995
Leonard Nimoy	I Am Spock	1995
Anthony Quinn	One Man Tango	1995
Maureen Stapleton	One Hell of a Life	1995
Burt Ward	Boy Wonder: My Life In Tights	1995
Claire Bloom	Leaving a Doll's House	1996
James Doohan	Beam Me Up, Scotty	1996
Fran Drescher	Enter Whining	1996
Alec Guinness	My Name Escapes Me	1996
Clayton Moore	I Was That Masked Man	1996
Leslie Nielsen	Bad Golf My Way	1996
Christopher Reeve	Still Me	1996
Aaron Spelling	A Prime-Time Life	1996
Cathy Lee Crosby	Let the Magic Begin	1997
Yaphet Kotto	The Royalty: A Spiritual Awakening	1997
Jerry Mathers	...And Myself as the Beaver	1997
Frank Muir	A Kentish Lad	1997
Kenneth Branagh	Beginning	1998
Jackie Chan	My Life in Action	1998
Peter Coyote	Sleeping Where I Fall	1998
Peter Fonda	Don't Tell Dad	1998
Walter Koenig	Warped Factors: A Neurotic's Guide to the Universe	1998
Patrick Macnee	The Avengers and Me	1998
Carroll O'Connor	I Think I'm Outta Here	1998
Grace Lee Whitney	The Longest Trek: My Tour of the Galaxy	1998
Ed Wood, Jr.	Hollywood Rat Race (published posthumously)	1998
Albert R. Broccoli	When the Snow Melts (released posthumously)	1999
Alec Guinness	A Positively Final Appearance	1999
Gloria Stuart	I Just Keep Hoping	1999
Esther Williams	Million-Dollar Mermaid	1999
Paul Daniels	Under No Illusion	2000
Michael York	How a Shakespearean Prepares	2000
Linda Blair	Going Vegan	2001
Larry Hagman	Hello Darlin': Tall – and Absolutely True – Tales From My Life	2001
Anne Heche	Call Me Crazy	2001
Sidney Poitier	The Measure of a Man: A Spiritual Autobiography	2001
Lisa Whelchel	Life Lessons From Heavenly Father, AKA I've Taken the Good, I've Taken the Bad...	2001
Michael York	Dispatches From Armageddon	2001
Michael J. Fox	Lucky Man	2002
Richard Kiel	Making It Big In the Movies	2002
Richard Chamberlain	Shattered Love	2003
Tracey Gold	Room to Grow: an Appetite for Life	2003
Traci Lords	Underneath It All	2003
Caroll Spinney	Lessons From a Life in Feathers	2003
Gregory Walcott	Hollywood Adventures	2003
Sean Astin	There and Back Again: an Actor's Tale	2004
Ben Gazzara	In the Moment	2004
Tatum O'Neal	A Paper Life	2004
Alison Sweeney	All the Days of My Life (So Far), AKA Sami-I-Am	2004
Wil Wheaton	Dancing Barefoot	2004
Dick York	The Seesaw Girl & Me (published posthumously)	2004
Alan Alda	Never Have Your Dog Stuffed And Other Things I've Learned	2005
Dirk Benedict	Confessions of a Kamikaze Cowboy	2005
Jane Fonda	My Life So Far, AKA Working It Out	2005
Lauren Bacall	By Myself and Then Some	2005
Tab Hunter	TH Confidential: the Making of a Movie Star	2005
Brooke Shields	Down Came the Rain: My Journey Through Postpartum Depression	2005
Eli Wallach	The Good, the Bad, and Me	2005
Michael York	Are My Blinkers Showing? Film-making & Other Adventures In the New Russia	2005
Nena	"Do You Want to Go With Me?" (Willst du mit mir gehn?)	2005
Adrienne Barbeau	There Are Worse Things I Could Do	2006
Ellen Burstyn	Lessons In Becoming Myself	2006
Carmen Electra	How to Be Sexy	2006
Peter Falk	Just One More Thing	2006
David Hasselhoff	Don't Hassel the Hoff	2006
Denzel Washington	A Hand to Guide Me	2006
Willie Aames	Grace Is Enough	2007
David Cassidy	Could It Be Forever?	2007
Bruce Dern	Things I've Said, But Probably Shouldn't Have: an Unrepentant Memoir	2007
Kirk Douglas	Let's Face It	2007
Rutger Hauer	All Those Moments	2007
Norman Jewison	This Terrible Business Has Been Good To Me	2007
Gabe Kaplan	Kotter's Back	2007
Dave Madden	Reuben on Wry	2007
Alan Young	Mr. Ed & Me & More	2007
Ed Begley, Jr.	Living Like Ed: A Guide to the Eco-Friendly Life	2008
Kirk Cameron	Still Growing	2008
Sean Connery	Being a Scot	2008
Tony Curtis	American Prince	2008
Mark Goddard	To Space and Back	2008
Gary David Goldberg	Sit, Ubu, Sit: How I Went from Brooklyn to Hollywood With the Same Woman, the Same Dog, and a Lot Less Hair	2008
George Hamilton	Don't Mind If I Do	2008
Chelsea Handler	Are You There, Vodka? It's Me, Chelsea	2008
Maureen McCormick	Here's the Story: Surviving Marcia Brady and Finding My True Voice	2008
Tori Spelling	Stori Telling	2008
Robert Wagner	Pieces of My Heart	2008
Julie Walters	That's Another Story	2008
Ernest Borgnine	Ernie: the Autobiography	2009
Dustin Diamond	Behind the Bell	2009
Robert Englund	Hollywood Monster	2009
Michael J. Fox	Always Looking Up	2009
Alyssa Milano	Safe at Home	2009
Roger Moore	My Word Is My Bond	2009
Mackenzie Phillips	High on Arrival	2009
Patrick Swayze	The Time of My Life	2009
Dick Van Patten	Eighty Is Not Enough: One Actor's Journey Through the American Entertainment Industry	2009
Melissa Sue Anderson	The Way I See It: a Look Back at My Life	2010
Peter Bowles	Ask Me If I'm Happy	2010
Michael Caine	What's It All About; The Elephant to Hollywood	2010
Judi Dench	And, Furthermore...	2010
Shannen Doherty	Badass: A Hard-Earned Guide to Leading Your Life with Style and (the Right) Attitude	2010
Michael J. Fox	A Funny Thing Happened On the Way To the Future	2010
Louis Gossett Jr.	An Actor and a Gentleman	2010
Harry Hamlin	Full Frontal Nudity	2010
Molly Ringwald	Getting the Pretty Back	2010
Tori Spelling	Uncharted Territori	2010
Jodie Sweetin	UnSweetined	2010
Jerry Weintraub	When I Stop Talking, You'll Know I'm Dead	2010
Meredith Baxter	Untied	2011
Julie Dawn Cole	I Want It NOW!	2011
Barbara Eden	Jeannie Out of the Bottle	2011
James Garner	The Garner Files	2011
Rob Lowe	Stories I Only Tell My Friends	2011
Hal Needham	Stuntman: My Death-Defying Hollywood Life	2011
Julie Newmar	The Conscious Catwoman Explains Life On Earth	2011
David Prowse	Straight From the Force's Mouth	2011
Heather Donahue	Growgirl: How My Life After The Blair Witch Project Went to Pot	2012
Frank Langella	Dropped Names	2012
Julie London	Once I Was a Debutante (published posthumously)	2012
R. Lee Ermey	Gunny's Rules: How To Get Squared Away Like a Marine	2013
Corey Feldman	Corey-ography	2013
Gunnar Hansen	Chainsaw Confidential: Making the World's Most Notorious Horror Movie	2013
Melissa Joan Hart	Melissa Explains It All: Tales from My Abnormally Normal Life	2013
George Lazenby	This Is What Happened To the Other Fellow	2013
David Suchet	Poirot and Me	2013
Bill Allen	My RAD Career	2014
Cary Elwes	As You Wish	2014
Danielle Fishel	Normally, This Would Be Cause For Concern: Tales of Calamity and Unrelenting Awkwardness	2014
Jennie Garth	Deep Thoughts From a Hollywood Blonde	2014
Anjelica Huston	Watch Me	2014
Ron Perlman	Easy Street, the Hard Way	2014
Brooke Shields	There Was a Little Girl: The Real Story of My Mother and Me	2014
Martin Short	I Must Say: My Life As a Humble Legend	2014
Kathy Coleman	Lost Girl	2015
Mariel Hemingway	Out Came the Sun	2015
Charlotte Rae	The Facts Of My Life, AKA I Haven't Changed; Only My Strokes Are Diff'rent	2015
Burt Reynolds	...But Enough About Me	2015
Peter Davison	Is There Life Outside the Box?	2016
Peter Engel	I Was Saved by the Bell: Stories of Life, Love, and Dreams that Indeed Came True	2016
Joel Grey	Master of Ceremonies	2016
Kathy Coleman	Run, Holly! Run!	2017
William Daniels	There I Go Again	2017
Anna Faris	Unqualified	2017
Gary Busey	Busey-isms	2018
Bernard Cribbins	Bernard Who: 75 Years of Doing Absolutely Everything	2018
Olivia Hussey	The Girl On the Balcony	2018
Patrick Kilpatrick	Dying For a Living: Sins and Confessions of a Hollywood Villain-Turned-Libertine Patriot	2018
Nick Nolte	Rebel: My Life Outside the Lines	2018
Matthias Hues	Shirtless in Hollywood	2019
Val Kilmer	I'm Your Huckleberry	2020
Gabriel Byrne	Walking With Ghosts	2021
Hayley Mills	Forever Young	2021
Jamie Lynn Spears	Things I Should Have Said	2021
Sharon Stone	The Beauty of Living Twice	2021
Mena Suvari	The Great Peace	2021
Don Bluth	Somewhere Out There: My Animated Life	2022
Geena Davis	Dying of Politeness	2022
Ralph Macchio	Waxing On	2022
Matthew Perry	Friends, Lovers, and the Big Terrible Thing	2022
Kelly Ripa	Live Wire	2022
Bill Mumy	The Full Mumy, AKA It's Been a Real Good Life	2023
Sam Neill	Did I Ever Tell You This...?	2023
John Stamos	If You Would Have Told Me...	2023
Patrick Stewart	Making It So	2023
Josh Brolin	From Under the Truck	2024
Tom Selleck	You Never Know	2024
Donald Sutherland	Made Up, But Still True (published posthumously)	2024
Billy Dee Williams	What Have We Here?	2024
Edward Zwick	Hits, Flops, and Other Illusions: My Fortysomething Years in Hollywood	2024
Tim Curry	Vagabond	2025
Priscilla Presley	Softly, as I Leave You: Life After Elvis	2025
Christina Applegate	You With the Sad Eyes	2026
Valerie Bertinelli	Getting Naked	2026
Judi Dench	Is It Too Late to Make a Run for It?	2026
Jennie Garth	I Choose Me	2026
Dustin Hoffman	Look at Me	2026
Christopher Lloyd	In My Own Time	2026
Dolph Lundgren	Fights Worth Fighting	2026
Kyle MacLachlan	Fictional Selves	2026
Hayden Panettiere	This Is Me: a Reckoning	2026
Eve Plumb	Happiness Included: Jan Brady & Beyond	2026
Ke Huy Quan	Never Say Die	2026
Christy Carlson Romano	Once Upon a Trainwreck: the Fall and Rise of a Child Star	2026
Jaclyn Smith	I Once Knew a Guy Named Charlie	2026
Sylvester Stallone	The Steps	2026
History
Edward Gibbon	Memoirs of My Life and Writings	17xx
Henry Adams	The Education of Henry Adams	1907
Martin Latham	The Bookseller's Tale	2020
Journalism
Mehmood Hashmi	Kashmir Udaas Hai	1950
Lowell Thomas	Good Evening, Everybody	1976
Jessica Savitch	Anchorwoman	1982
Peter Sissons	When One Door Closes	2011
John Craven	Headlines and Hedgerows	2019
Law
Helene E. Schwartz	Lawyering	1976
Literature
Libanius	Oration	0374
Sei Shōnagon	The Pillow Book	1002
Kamo No Chomei	Hōjōki	1212
Leonor López de Córdoba	Memorias (López de Córdoba)	1400
Margery Kempe	The Book of Margery Kempe	1436
Girolamo Cardano	The Book of My Life	1576
Michel de Montaigne	Of the Education of Children	1580
Abraham Cowley	Of Myself	1668
Colley Cibber	An Apology for the Life of Mr. Colley Cibber, Written by Himself	1740
Voltaire	Mémoires pour servir à la vie de M. de Voltaire, écrits par lui-même	1759
Jean-Jacques Rousseau	Confessions	1770
Benjamin Franklin	The Autobiography of Benjamin Franklin	1791
Walter Scott	"Memoirs"	1808–1826
Johann Wolfgang von Goethe	Dichtung und Wahrheit	1811-1833
Samuel Taylor Coleridge	Biographia Literaria	1817
Johann Wolfgang von Goethe	Italian Journey	1817
Thomas De Quincey	Confessions of an English Opium-Eater	1821
James Hogg	Altrive Tales: Featuring a Memoir of the Author's Life	1832
Charles Dickens	Autobiographical Fragment	1847
Johann Wolfgang von Goethe	The Autobiography Of Goethe: Truth And Poetry, From My Own Life	1848
William Wordsworth	The Prelude	1850
Leo Tolstoy	Childhood, Boyhood, and Youth	1856
Alexandre Dumas	Mes Mémoires	1856
John Neal	Wandering Recollections of a Somewhat Busy Life: An Autobiography	1869
Sara Coleridge	Memoir	1874
Thomas Carlyle	Reminiscences	1881
Ambrose Bierce	What I Saw of Shiloh	1881
Anthony Trollope	An Autobiography	1883
Walt Whitman	Specimen Days	1883
Leo Tolstoy	A Confession	1884
John Ruskin	Praeterita: Outlines of Scenes and Thoughts Perhaps Worthy of Memory in My Past Life	1885
Oscar Wilde	De Profundis	1897
Margaret Oliphant	The Autobiography of Margaret Oliphant	1899
George Bernard Shaw	Shaw: an Autobiography, 1898–1950: The Playwright Years	1907
Victor Hugo	Victor Hugo's Intellectual Autobiography	1907
Henry James	A Small Boy and Others	1913
Maxim Gorky	My Childhood	1913
William Butler Yeats	Reveries Over Childhood and Youth	1916
Mark Twain	Autobiography of Mark Twain	1910
Henry James	Notes of a Son and Brother	1914
Mary Augusta Ward	A Writer's Recollections	1918
Robert Graves	Good-Bye to All That	1929
Lincoln Steffens	Autobiography of Lincoln Steffens	1931
Walter Benjamin	Unpacking My Library	1931
Vera Brittain	Testament of Youth	1933
Gertrude Stein	The Autobiography of Alice B. Toklas	1933
H. G. Wells	Experiment in Autobiography	1934
William Butler Yeats	Autobiography	1936
G. K. Chesterton	The Autobiography of G.K. Chesterton	1936
Claude McKay	A Long Way From Home	1937
Noël Coward	Present Indicative	1937
Virginia Woolf	Moments of Being	1938
William Butler Yeats	Autobiographies of William Butler Yeats	1938
A. A. Milne	It's Too Late Now	1939
John Buchan	Memory Hold the Door	1940
F. Scott Fitzgerald	A Short Autobiography	1940
Zora Neale Hurston	Dust Tracks on a Road	1942
Stefan Zweig	The World of Yesterday	1942
Dylan Thomas	Holiday Memory	1942
Richard Wright	Black Boy	1945
George Orwell	Such, Such Were the Joys...	1947
Nirad C. Chaudhuri	The Autobiography of an Unknown Indian	1951
Christy Brown	My Left Foot	1954
Elie Wiesel	Night	1955
Mary McCarthy	Memories of a Catholic Girlhood	1957
Mary McCarthy	How I Grew	1987
P. G. Wodehouse	Over Seventy	1957
Dick Francis	The Sport of Queens	1957
Simone de Beauvoir	The Prime of Life	1960
John Betjeman	Summoned by Bells	1960
Laurie Lee	Cider with Rosie	1960
Evelyn Waugh	A Little Learning	1966
Vladimir Nabokov	Speak, Memory	1966
P. J. Kavanagh	The Perfect Stranger	1966
C. S. Lewis	Surprised by Joy	1966
Rosamond Lehmann	The Swan in the Evening: Fragments of an Inner Life	1967
Edward Abbey	Desert Solitaire	1968
J. R. Ackerley	My Father and Myself	1968
Czesław Miłosz	Native Realm: A Search for Self-Definition	1968
Laurie Lee	As I Walked Out One Midsummer Morning	1969
Maya Angelou	I Know Why the Caged Bird Sings	1969
Anaïs Nin	The Diary of Anaïs Nin	1976
Nadezhda Mandelstam	Hope Against Hope	1970
Graham Greene	A Sort of Life	1971
Wole Soyinka	The Man Died: Prison Notes	1971
Mario Puzo	The Godfather Papers & Other Confessions	1972
Joyce Maynard	Looking Back: A Chronicle of Growing Up Old in the Sixties	1973
James Baldwin	The Devil Finds Work	1976
Pablo Neruda	Memoirs (Confieso que he vivido: Memorias)	1977
Agatha Christie	Agatha Christie: An Autobiography	1977
Wole Soyinka	Aké: The Years of Childhood	1981
John Mortimer	Clinging to the Wreckage: A Part of Life	1982
Michael Ondaatje	Running in the Family	1982
Janet Frame	To the Is-land	1982
Janet Frame	An Angel at My Table and The Envoy From Mirror City	1984
Eudora Welty	One Writer's Beginnings	1983
Roald Dahl	Boy: Tales of Childhood	1984
Roald Dahl	Going Solo	1986
Anthony Burgess	Little Wilson and Big God	1986
Annie Dillard	An American Childhood	1987
Anthony Burgess	You've Had Your Time	1990
Kurt Vonnegut	Fates Worse Than Death	1991
James A. Michener	The World Is My Home: A Memoir	1992
Nina Berberova	The Italics are Mine	1993
Doris Lessing	Under My Skin: Volume One of My Autobiography, to 1949	1994
Alan Sillitoe	Life Without Armour	1995
Gore Vidal	Palimpsest: A Memoir	1995
J. M. Coetzee	Boyhood: Scenes from Provincial Life	1997
Doris Lessing	Walking in the Shade: Volume Two of My Autobiography, 1949 to 1962	1997
René Galand	War Hentoù an Tremened	2002
Amos Oz	A Tale of Love and Darkness	2002
Maya Angelou	The Collected Autobiographies of Maya Angelou	2002
Orhan Pamuk	Istanbul: Memories and the City	2003
Gay Talese	A Writer's Life	2006
Roald Dahl	More About Boy (published posthumously)	2008
Jacqueline Wilson	Jacky Daydream & My Secret Diary	2008
Andrea Ashworth	Once in a House on Fire	2011
Paul Kipchumba	Turning Point in My Life	2016
Mathematics
G. H. Hardy	A Mathematician's Apology	1940
Norbert Wiener	I Am a Mathematician	1964
Bertrand Russell	Autobiography	1967
Freeman Dyson	Disturbing the Universe	1979
Paul Halmos	I Want to be a Mathematician: An Automathography	1985
Stanislaw Ulam	Adventures of a Mathematician	1991
André Weil	The Apprenticeship of a Mathematician	1992
Gian-Carlo Rota	Indiscrete Thoughts	1998
Vladimir Arnold	Yesterday and Long Ago	2006
Neal Koblitz	Random Curves: Journeys of a Mathematician	2007
Goro Shimura	The Map of My Life	2008
Edward Frenkel	Love and Math: The Heart of Hidden Reality	2014
Michael Harris	Mathematics without Apologies: Portrait of a Problematic Vocation	2015
Cédric Villani	Birth of a Theorem: A Mathematical Adventure	2015
Medicine
Albert Schweitzer	Out of My Life and Thought	1933
Sydney Smith	Mostly Murder	1959
Sandra Lee	Put Your Best Face Forward	2019
Military
Ulysses S. Grant	Personal Memoirs of Ulysses S. Grant	1885
Manfred von Richthofen	The Red Baron (Der rote Kampfflieger)	1917
Heinz Guderian	Panzer Leader	1950
Music
Hector Berlioz	Mémoires	1870
Elsa Reger	Mein Leben mit und für Max Reger (My life with and for Max Reger)	1930
Billie Holiday	Lady Sings the Blues	1956
Pat Boone	A New Song	1970
Pablo Casals	Joys and Sorrows: Reflections	1970
Charles Mingus	Beneath the Underdog	1971
Paul Bowles	Without Stopping	1972
Tom Sullivan	If You Could See What I Hear	1975
Tom Sullivan	Adventures In Darkness	1976
Liberace	The Things I Love	1977
Ray Charles	Brother Ray	1978
Pinky Tomlin	The Object of My Affection	1981
Dizzy Gillespie	To Be or Not to Bop	1982
Lennon Sisters	Same Song, Separate Voices	1985
Davy Jones	They Made a Monkee Out Of Me, AKA Do I Tell It Like I'm Joking?	1986
Tina Turner	I, Tina	1986
Michael Jackson	Moonwalk	1988
Frank Zappa	The Real FZ Book	1988
Debbie Gibson	Between the Lines	1989
Sonny Bono	And the Beat Goes On	1991
La Toya Jackson	La Toya: Growing Up in the Jackson Family	1991
Vanilla Ice	Ice By Ice	1991
Micky Dolenz	I'm a Believer	1993
Naomi Judd	Love Can Build a Bridge	1993
Roy Clark	My Life – In Spite of Myself	1994
Ice-T	The Ice Opinion	1994
Dolly Parton	My Life and Other Unfinished Business	1994
Boy George	Taking It Like a Man	1995
Luciano Pavarotti	My World	1995
Wolfman Jack	Have Mercy!	1995
Waylon Jennings	Waylon, AKA Just Another Good Ol' Boy	1996
Aerosmith	Walk This Way	1997
Chuck D	Fight the Power	1997
John Denver	Take Me Home	1997
LL Cool J	I Make My Own Rules	1997
Jimmy Buffett	A Pirate Looks At 50	1998
Marilyn Manson	The Long Hard Road Out of Hell	1998
Ray Manzarek	Light My Fire: Life With the Doors	1998
Yehudi Menuhin	Unfinished Journey: Twenty Years Later	1999
Paul Nicholas	Behind the Smile	1999
Donny Osmond	Life Is Just What You Make It	1999
Meat Loaf	To Hell and Back	2000
Britney Spears	Heart to Heart	2000
Gene Simmons	KISS and Makeup	2002
Carnie Wilson	I'm Still Hungry	2003
Sting	Broken Music	2003
Jimmy Dean	Thirty Years of Sausage & Fifty Years of Ham	2004
Bob Dylan	Chronicles: Volume One	2004
Merle Haggard	My House of Memories	2004
Anthony Kiedis	Scar Tissue	2004
Nena	"Do You Want to Go With Me?" (Willst du mit mir gehn?)	2005
Bobby "Boris" Pickett	Monster Mash: Half-Dead in Hollywood	2005
Robie Lester	Lingerie For Hookers In the Snow (released posthumously)	2006
John Reed	Nothing Whatever to Grumble At: His Story, as told to Cynthia Morey	2006
Alice Cooper	Golf Monster: A Rock 'n' Roller's 12 Steps to Becoming a Golf Addict	2007
Mike Oldfield	Changeling	2007
Horace Silver	Let's Get to the Nitty Gritty	2007
Slash	It Seems Excessive...But That Doesn't Mean it Didn't Happen	2007
Miley Cyrus	Miles To Go	2008
Eminem	The Way I Am	2008
Westlife	Our Story	2008
Carnie Wilson	Gut Feelings	2008
Marie Osmond	I May As Well Laugh About It	2009
Belinda Carlisle	Lips Unsealed	2010
Keith Richards	Life	2010
Rick Springfield	Late, Late at Night	2010
Alice Bag	Violence Girl	2011
Ace Frehley	No Regrets	2011
Florence Henderson	Life Is Not a Stage: From Broadway Baby to a Lovely Lady and Beyond, with Joel Brokaw	2011
Shania Twain	From This Moment On	2011
Gregg Allman	My Cross to Bear	2012
Larry Butler	Just For the Record	2012
Peter Criss	Makeup to Breakup: My Life In and Out of KISS	2012
Elton John	Love Is the Cure	2012
Dee Snider	Shut Up and Give Me the Mic	2012
Pete Townshend	Who I Am	2012
Shirley Jones	SJ: a Memoir, AKA I Don't Jest, but Please Call Me Shirley!	2013
Shane Filan	My Side of Life	2014
Edgar Froese	Force Majeure: 47 Years of Tangerine Dream-ing	2014
Paul Stanley	Face the Music: A Life Exposed	2014
Sir Tom Jones	Over the Top & Back	2015
Sebastian Bach	18 & Life on Skid Row	2016
Thomas Dolby	The Speed of Sound	2016
Lita Ford	Living Like a Runaway	2016
Grace Jones	I'll Never Write My Memoirs	2016
Toni Tennille	TT: a Memoir, AKA The Captain & I	2016
Jack Wild	It's a Dodger's Life, AKA Reviewing My Situation (published posthumously)	2016
Charlie Daniels	Never Look At the Empty Seats	2017
Samantha Fox	Forever, AKA A Fox for All Centuries	2017
Art Garfunkel	What Is It All But Luminous?	2017
Mike Nesmith	Infinite Tuesday: an Autobiographical Riff	2017
John Oates	Change of Seasons	2017
Roger Daltrey	Thanks a Lot, Mr. Kibblewhite	2018
K.K. Downing	Heavy Duty: My Days & Nights In Judas Priest	2018
Drew Fortier	Dark, Depressing, and Hilarious	2018
Steve Lukather	The Gospel According to Luke	2018
Olivia Newton-John	Don't Stop Believing	2018
Leif Garrett	Idol Truth	2019
John Georgiadis	Bow to Baton: A Leader's Life	2019
Deborah Harry	Face It	2019
Liz Phair	Horror Stories	2019
Andrew Ridgeley	WHAM!, George Michael, & Me	2019
Stephen Morris (musician)	Record Play Pause	2019
Mariah Carey	The Meaning of M.C.	2020
Jessica Simpson	Open Book	2020
Kathy Valentine	All I Ever Wanted: A Rock 'N' Roll Memoir	2020
Richard Marx	Stories to Tell	2021
Stephen Morris (musician)	Fast Forward	2021
Paul Nicholas	Musicals, Marigolds, & Me	2021
Sinéad O'Connor	Rememberings	2021
Gina Schock	Made In Hollywood: All Access with the Go-Go's	2021
Will Smith	Will, AKA Where There's a Way	2021
Bono	Surrender	2022
Boy George	Karma	2023
Britney Spears	The Woman In Me	2023
Bonnie Tyler	Straight from the Heart	2023
Moon Zappa	Earth to Moon	2024
Ozzy Osbourne	Last Rites (released posthumously)	2025
Lionel Richie	Truly	2025
Liza Minnelli	Kids, Wait Till You Hear This!	2026
Jane Wiedlin	TMI: Memoirs of a Go-Go	2026
Natural History
Charles Darwin	The Recollections of the Development of My Mind and Character	1876
Charles Darwin	The Autobiography of Charles Darwin	1887
Philosophy
Jean-Paul Sartre	The Words	1964
David Hume	My Own Life	1777
John Stuart Mill	Autobiography	1874
Paramahansa Yogananda	Autobiography of a Yogi	1955
Simone de Beauvoir	The Prime of Life	1960
Physics
Philip M. Morse	In at the Beginnings: A Physicist's Life	1976
Richard Feynman	Surely You're Joking, Mr. Feynman!	1985
Luis Alvarez	Alvarez: Adventures of a Physicist	1987
Emilio Segrè	A Mind Always in Motion	1993
Fay Ajzenberg-Selove	A Matter of Choices: Memoirs of a Female Physicist	1994
Alvin M. Weinberg	The First Nuclear Era: The Life and Times of a Technological Fixer	1994
John Wheeler	Geons, Black Holes, and Quantum Foam: A Life in Physics	1998
Maurice Wilkins	Maurice Wilkins: The Third Man of the Double Helix	2003
Isaak Khalatnikov	From the Atomic Bomb to the Landau Institute: Autobiography. Top Non-Secret	2012
Rudolf Peierls	Bird of Passage: Recollections of a Physicist	2014
Politics
Marcus Aurelius	Meditations	0175
Manuel Belgrano	Autobiography of Manuel Belgrano	1814
Frederick Douglass	Narrative of the Life of Frederick Douglass, an American Slave	1845
Frederick Douglass	My Bondage and My Freedom	1855
Joaquim Nabuco	Minha formação	1900
Booker T. Washington	Up from Slavery	1901
Theodore Roosevelt	Theodore Roosevelt: An Autobiography	1913
Stephen A. Douglas	Autobiography of Stephen A. Douglas	1913
Emmeline Pankhurst	My Own Story	1914
Mary Harris Jones	Autobiography of Mother Jones	1925
Adolf Hitler	Mein Kampf	1925
Benito Mussolini	My Autobiography: With the Political and Social Doctrine of Fascism	1928
Calvin Coolidge	The Autobiography of Calvin Coolidge	1929
Winston Churchill	My Early Life	1930
Jawaharlal Nehru	An Autobiography	1936
Manny Shinwell	Conflict Without Malice	1955
Winston Churchill	Memoirs of the Second World War	1959
Malcolm X	The Autobiography of Malcolm X	1965
Golda Meir	My Life	1973
Manny Shinwell	I've Lived Through It All	1973
Manny Shinwell	Lead With the Left: My First Ninety-Six Years	1981
Roy Hattersley	A Yorkshire Boyhood	1983
Trương Như Tảng	A Vietcong Memoir: An Inside Account of the Vietnam War and Its Aftermath	1986
Ronald Reagan	An American Life	1990
Margaret Thatcher	The Downing Street Years	1993
Dan Quayle	Standing Firm	1994
Nelson Mandela	Long Walk to Freedom	1995
Barack Obama	Dreams from My Father	1995
Margaret Thatcher	The Path to Power	1995
Dan Quayle	The American Family: Discovering the Values that Make Us Strong	1996
Dan Quayle	Worth Fighting For	1999
Bill Clinton	My Life	2004
Medgar Evers	The Autobiography of Medgar Evers	2005
Barack Obama	The Audacity of Hope	2006
Fidel Castro	My Life: A Spoken Autobiography	2006
Ronald Reagan	The Reagan Diaries	2007
John Howard	Lazarus Rising: A Personal and Political Autobiography	2010
Malala Yousafzai	I Am Malala	2013
Julia Gillard	My Story	2014
Jimmy Carter	A Full Life: Reflections at 90	2015
Sarah Mcbride	Tomorrow Will Be Different	2018
Psychology
Sigmund Freud	An Autobiographical Study	1925
Carl Jung	Memories, Dreams, Reflections	1962
Sports
Babe Ruth	The Babe Ruth Story	1948
Joe DiMaggio	Lucky to Be a Yankee	1951
Ted Husing	My Eyes Are In My Heart	1959
Jerry Kramer	Instant Replay	1968
Earl Weaver	Winning	1972
Muhammad Ali	The Greatest: My Own Story	1975
Bill Russell	Second Wind: The Memoirs of an Opinionated Man	1979
Earl Weaver	It's What You Learn After You Know It All That Counts	1983
Howard Cosell	I Never Played the Game	1985
Kapil Dev	By God's Decree	1985
Mark "Jacko" Jackson	Dumb Like a Fox	1986
Kapil Dev	Cricket My Style	1987
John Matuszak	Cruising With the Tooz	1987
Steve Howe	Between the Lines: My Struggle to Escape the Nightmare of Addiction	1989
Kareem Abdul-Jabbar	Giant Steps	1990
Wilt Chamberlain	A View From Above	1990
Elizabeth Manley	Thumbs Up	1990
Nancy Kerrigan	In My Own Words	1996
Dominique Moceanu	DM: an Autobiography	1996
Tara Lipinski	Triumph on Ice	1998
Jesse Ventura	I Ain't Got Time To Bleed	1998
Durwood Merrill	You're Out and You're Ugly Too! Confessions of an Umpire With Attitude	1999
Summer Sanders	Champions Are Raised, Not Born	1999
Tony Hawk	Occupation: Skateboarder	2000
Pete Sampras	A Champion's Mind: Lessons From a Life In Tennis	2000
Tiger Woods	How I Play Golf	2001
Rowdy Roddy Piper	In the Pit	2002
Earl Weaver	Weaver on Strategy	2002
Ken Kaiser	Planet of the Umps: My Life Behind the Plate, with Kevin Fisher	2003
Sasha Cohen	Fire On Ice	2005
Katarina Witt	Only With Passion	2005
Randy Couture	Becoming the Natural: My Life In and Out of the Cage	2008
Evander Holyfield	Becoming EH: a Fighter's Journey	2008
Tito Ortiz	This Is Gonna Hurt: the Life of a Mixed Martial Arts Champion	2008
Hulk Hogan	My Life Outside the Ring	2009
Andre Agassi	Open: An Autobiography	2010
Big John McCarthy	Are You Ready? Let's Get It On! The Making of MMA and Its Ultimate Referee	2011
Shawn Johnson	Winning Balance: What I've Learned So Far about Love, Faith, and Living Your Dreams	2013
Milkha Singh	The Race of My Life	2013
Yuvraj Singh	The Test of My Life	2013
Mike Tyson	Undisputed Truth	2013
Sachin Tendulkar	Playing It My Way	2014
Nastia Liukin	Finding My Shine	2015
Thomas Hitzlsperger	Mutproben	2024
Nicole Bobek	Bobek: the Wild One	2025
Religion/Theology
Augustine of Hippo	Confessions	398
Albert Schweitzer	Out of My Life and Thought	1933
Bob Erler	They Called Me the Catch Me Killer	1982
Dalai Lama	My Land and My People	1962
Edith Stein	Life in a Jewish Family	1986
Pope John Paul II	Gift and Mystery	1996
Robert H. Schuller	My Journey: From an Iowa Farm to a Cathedral of Dreams	2001
Oswald Rufeisen	I Swallowed the Catch of Queen of Carmel	2001
Morris Cerullo	The Legend of Morris Cerullo: How God Used an Orphan to Change the World	2016
Lilia Tarawa	Daughter of Gloriavale: My Life in a Religious Cult	2017
Uncategorized
Al-Ghazali	The Deliverer from Error	1100
Peter Abelard	Historia Calamitatum	1132
Firoz Shah Tuglaq	Futuhat-e-firozshahi	1351
Tuzuk-i-Babri	Baburnama	1520
Teresa of Ávila	Life of St. Teresa of Jesus	1567
Benvenuto Cellini	The Autobiography of Benvenuto Cellini	1570
Gerolamo Cardano	De Vita Propria/De Propria Vita Liber	1576
Jahangir	Tuzuk-i-Jahangiri	1610
John Bunyan	Grace Abounding to the Chief of Sinners	1666
Giambattista Vico	The Autobiography of Giambattista Vico	1741
Charlotte Charke	A Narrative of the Life of Mrs. Charlotte Charke (Youngest Daughter of Colley Cibber, Esq;)	1755
Elizabeth Ashbridge	Some Account of the Fore Part of the Life of Elizabeth Ashbridge	1755
Jonathan Edwards	Personal Narrative	1768
Olaudah Equiano	The Interesting Narrative of the Life of Olaudah Equiano	1789
Thomas Jefferson	Autobiography	1790
Mary Robinson	Memoirs of the Late Mrs. Robinson, Written by Herself	1801
Shen Fu	Six Records of a Floating Life	1808
William Cowper	Memoir of the Early Life of William Cowper, Esq., Written by Himself	1816
Harriette Wilson	Memoirs of Harriette Wilson	1825
Giacomo Casanova	Histoire de ma vie	1826
Cornelio Saavedra	Memoria autógrafa	1829
Richard Henry Dana Jr.	Two Years Before the Mast	1840
Alphonse de Lamartine	Les Confidences	1849
François-René de Chateaubriand	Mémoires d'Outre-Tombe	1849
George Sand	Story of My Life	1854
P. T. Barnum	The Life of P.T. Barnum, Written by Himself	1855
Kit Carson	Memoirs	1856
Harriet Jacobs	Incidents in the Life of a Slave Girl	1861
John Henry Newman	Apologia Pro Vita Sua	1864
Harriet Martineau	Harriet Martineau's Autobiography	1887
Thomas Henry Huxley	Autobiography	1890
Stendhal	The Life of Henry Brulard	1890
Stendhal	Memoirs of an Egotist	1892
Thérèse of Lisieux	The Story of a Soul	1897
Buffalo Bill	The Life and Adventures of Buffalo Bill	1879
Helen Keller	The Story of My Life	1903
Geronimo	Geronimo's Story of His Life	1906
Edmund Gosse	Father and Son	1907
Annie Besant	An Autobiography	1908
James Weldon Johnson	The Autobiography of an Ex-Colored Man	1912
John Muir	The Story of My Boyhood and Youth	1913
Bertrand Russell	The Autobiography of Bertrand Russell (Vol. 1)	1914
Nikola Tesla	My Inventions: The Autobiography of Nikola Tesla	1919
Zitkala-Sa	Impressions of an Indian Childhood	1921
Constantin Stanislavski	My Life in Art	1924
Mahatma Gandhi	The Story of My Experiments with Truth	1927
Francis Yeats-Brown	The Lives of a Bengal Lancer	1930
Black Elk	Black Elk Speaks	1931
Beryl Markham	West with the Night	1942
Bertrand Russell	The Autobiography of Bertrand Russell (Vol. 2)	1944
Albert Einstein	Autobiographical Notes	1945
Primo Levi	If This Is a Man	1947
Anne Frank	The Diary of a Young Girl	1947
Thomas Merton	The Seven Storey Mountain	1948
William Carlos Williams	The Autobiography of William Carlos Williams	1948
H. V. Kaltenborn	Fifty Fabulous Years	1950
A. J. Cronin	Adventures in Two Worlds	1952
Dorothy Day	The Long Loneliness	1952
Whittaker Chambers	Witness	1952
Bing Crosby	Call Me Lucky	1953
Gerald Durrell	My Family and Other Animals	1956
Jessica Mitford	Hons and Rebels	1960
Chet Huntley	The Generous Years	1968
Florida Scott-Maxwell	The Measure of My Days	1968
Quentin Crisp	The Naked Civil Servant	1968
Bertrand Russell	The Autobiography of Bertrand Russell (Vol. 3)	1969
Albert Speer	Inside the Third Reich	1970
Marguerite de Angeli	Butter at the Old Price	1971
Michael Collins	Carrying the Fire: An Astronaut's Journeys	1974
Diana Mitford	A Life of Contrasts	1977
Sheldon Vanauken	A Severe Mercy	1977
Albert Facey	A Fortunate Life	1981
Richard Rodriguez	Hunger of Memory	1982
Joseph D. Pistone	Donnie Brasco: My Undercover Life in the Mafia	1988
Jamaica Kincaid	A Small Place	1988
Janet Frame	An Autobiography	1989
Eva Hoffman	Lost in Translation: A Life in a New Language	1989
William Styron	Darkness Visible	1990
Laurie Lee	A Moment of War	1991
Brian Keenan	An Evil Calling	1991
Dalai Lama	Freedom in Exile	1991
M. F. K. Fisher	Long Ago in France: The Years in Dijon	1991
Reinaldo Arenas	Before Night Falls	1992
M. F. K. Fisher	To Begin Again: Stories and Memoirs 1908-1929	1992
Chang Jung	Wild Swans	1992
Mary Isabella Lee	The Not So Poor	1992
Mario Vargas Llosa	A Fish in the Water	1993
Blake Morrison	And When Did You Last See Your Father?	1993
M. F. K. Fisher	Stay Me, Oh Comfort Me: Journals and Stories 1933-1941	1993
Victor Villanueva	Bootstraps: From an American Academic of Color	1993
Naguib Mahfouz	Echoes of an Autobiography	1994
Wole Soyinka	Ibadan: The Penkelemes Years: A Memoir 1946-65	1994
Tobias Wolff	In Pharaoh's Army	1994
Elie Wiesel	All Rivers Run to the Sea: Memoirs (Vol. 1)	1995
M. F. K. Fisher	Last House: Reflections, Dreams and Observations 1943-1991	1995
Mary Karr	The Liars' Club	1995
Frank McCourt	Angela's Ashes	1996
Isaac Bashevis Singer	Love and Exile: An Autobiographical Trilogy	1996
Patrick Chamoiseau	School Days (Une enfance Créole)	1996
Harold Brodkey	The Wild Darkness: The Story of My Death	1996
Spalding Gray	It's a Slippery Slope	1997
David Sedaris	Naked	1997
Jesse Lee Kercheval	Space: A Memoir	1998
Elie Wiesel	And the Sea is Never Full: Memoirs (Vol. 3)	1999
John McCain	Faith of My Fathers	1999
Marc Summers	Everything in Its Place	1999
Ariel Dorfman	Heading South, Looking North: A Bilingual Journey	1999
Taslima Nasrin	My Girlhood	1999
A. P. J. Abdul Kalam	Wings of Fire	1999
Dave Eggers	A Heartbreaking Work of Staggering Genius	2000
Lorna Sage	Bad Blood, A Memoir	2000
Edward Said	Out of Place: A Memoir	2000
Haven Kimmel	A Girl Named Zippy	2001
Paula Fox	Borrowed Finery	2001
Keith Jessop	Goldfinder	2001
Stan Lee	Excelsior	2002
Taslima Nasrin	Gusty Wind	2002
Gabriel García Márquez	Living to Tell the Tale	2002
J. M. Coetzee	Youth: Scenes from Provincial Life II	2002
Nuala O'Faolain	Almost There: The Onward Journey of a Dublin Woman	2003
Barry Norman	And Why Not? Memoirs of a Film Lover	2003
Craig Thompson	Blankets	2003
Sherwin B. Nuland	Lost in America: A Journey with My Father	2003
Azar Nafisi	Reading Lolita in Tehran	2003
Taslima Nasrin	Speak Up or Split Into Two	2003
Carlos Eire	Waiting for Snow in Havana	2003
Aron Ralston	Between a Rock and a Hard Place	2004
Emanuel Derman	My Life as a Quant: Reflections on Physics and Finance	2004
Anthony Kiedis	Scar Tissue	2004
Taslima Nasrin	Those Dark Days	2004
Kapil Dev	Straight From the Heart	2004
William F. Buckley, Jr.	Miles Gone By: A Literary Autobiography	2005
Chelsea Handler	My Horizontal Life: A Collection of One-Night Stands	2005
Jeannette Walls	The Glass Castle	2005
Taslima Nasrin	I Am Not Fine, But You Stay Well My Beloved Country	2006
Gordon Ramsay	Humble Pie	2006
Wole Soyinka	You Must Set Forth At Dawn	2006
Julia Child	My Life in France	2006
Ishmael Beah	A Long Way Gone	2007
Bob Barker	Priceless Memories	2009
Lizzie Velásquez	Lizzie Beautiful, The Lizzie Velásquez Story	2010
Taslima Nasrin	Nothing Is There	2010
Abhinav Bindra	A Shot at History	2011
Marcus Samuelsson	Yes, Chef: A Memoir	2012
Barry Norman	See You in the Morning	2013
Zohre Esmaeli	Meine neue Freiheit. Von Kabul über den Laufsteg zu mir selbst	2014
Ree Drummond	Frontier Follies: Adventures in Marriage and Motherhood in the Middle of Nowhere	2020
Alex Trebek	And the Answer Is...Reflections on My Life	2020
Ranjan Gogoi	Justice for the Judge	2021
Christie Brinkley	Uptown Girl	2025

== See also ==
- Lists of books
