= Butter at the Old Price =

Autobiography of children's author Marguerite de Angeli

Butter at the Old Price: The Autobiography of Marguerite de Angeli
- Front cover, designed by M. DeAngeli
- Author: Marguerite de Angeli
- Language: English
- Genre: Autobiography, children's literature
- Publisher: Doubleday Books
- Publication date: 1971
- Publication place: United States
- Media type: Print

Butter at the Old Price: The Autobiography of Marguerite de Angeli is an account of the life and work of the children's author and illustrator Marguerite de Angeli, who wrote such books as The Door in the Wall, Ted and Nina Go to the Grocery Store, Henner's Lydia, and Black Fox of Lorne. The autobiography was printed in 1971 by Doubleday Books when its author was 82 years old. Her 1946 story Bright April was the first children's book to address the divisive issue of racial prejudice. She was recipient of the 1950 Newbery Award for The Door in the Wall and was twice named a Caldecott Honor Book illustrator, first in 1945 for Yonie Wondernose and again in 1955 for Book of Nursery and Mother Goose Rhymes. She received a 1957 Newbery Honor mention for Black Fox of Lorne, a 1961 Lewis Carroll Shelf Award, and the 1968 Regina Medal.

== Plot ==
The autobiography is composed in an engaging and personal style, recounting the events of her family of six children, her affection for her husband, the many places they lived, and the circumstances leading to the stories and illustrations of her approximately thirty books.

== About The Title ==
Marguerite de Angeli explained the title as an old family saying, brought out when things did not go as hoped, based on an anecdote about a careless butter-maker.
