= Biographical Memoirs =

Biographical Memoirs could refer to

- Memoir, a collection of the author's personal memories

It could also refer to

- Biographical Memoirs of Fellows of the British Academy
- Biographical Memoirs of Fellows of the Indian National Science Academy
- Biographical Memoirs of Fellows of the Royal Society
- Biographical Memoirs of the National Academy of Sciences

== See also ==
- Memoir (disambiguation)
