= Yonie Wondernose =

Book by Marguerite De Angeli

- Author: Marguerite de Angeli
- Language: English
- Publisher: Doubleday Doran & Company, Inc.
- Publication date: 1944
- Pages: 48
- ISBN: 0-8361-9083-1
- Dewey Decimal: 813.5

Yonie Wondernose is a 1944 picture book by Marguerite de Angeli, who would later win the Newbery Medal for The Door in the Wall. Sometimes described as an "Amish Curious George", the book was to win the Caldecott Honor citation. As with many of de Angeli's books, she expressed interest in little-known and prejudged people. This was the second book she wrote about the Amish community, the first being Henner's Lydia.

== Plot ==
Described as a "wondernose" because he's so curious, seven-year-old Yonie has to become the man of the house when his parents go away.

Yonie is a boy who was left alone with his grandmother. His father gave him the responsibility of a man, to take care of the animals on the farm, not getting distracted as a "wondernose". The main things he has to do is to supply water and get wood for his grandmother. Later, lightning strikes the barn and starts a fire. Yonie saves all the animals, living up to the responsibility given by his father.
