= Graham Jessop =

British commercial diver and marine archaeologist

Personal information
- Born: 5 June 1957 Keighley, Great Britain
- Died: 1 November 2012 (aged 55)

Graham Jessop (5 June 1957 – 1 November 2012) was a British commercial diver and marine archaeologist who has taken part in a number of important expeditions such as the 1999 discovery of the remains of the RMS Carpathia off the coast of Ireland. Jessop subsequently purchased the Carpathia, so as to control access and protect it from private scavengers.

== Diving career ==
Along with his father, Keith Jessop, he recovered the approximately $85,000,000 of gold bullion from HMS Edinburgh in 1981.

In 2000, RMS Titanic Inc. named Jessop as the recovery manager of the wreck of the Titanic.

== Personal life ==
He was born in Keighley, West Yorkshire in 1957, and died from cancer on 1 November 2012.
