= Book of Nursery and Mother Goose Rhymes =

1955 Caldecott picture book

- Author: Marguerite de Angeli
- Publisher: Doubleday Books for Young Readers
- Publication date: 1954
- Pages: unpaged
- Awards: Caldecott Honor

Book of Nursery and Mother Goose Rhymes is a 1954 picture book written and illustrated by Marguerite de Angeli. The book is a collection of Mother Goose rhymes accompanied by illustrations. The book was a recipient of a 1955 Caldecott Honor for its illustrations.
