= Ted and Nina Go to the Grocery Store =

Ted and Nina Go to the Grocery Store is a 1935 children's story book written and illustrated by Marguerite de Angeli. Although de Angeli had previously illustrated books and stories for other authors, this was her first work as both author and illustrator. That she should compose such a book had been suggested by editor Helen Josephine Ferris of the Junior Literary Guild: "I have been getting letters asking for books suitable for very young readers - something they can read to themselves in the first grade. Why don't you write one? . . . Take a subject familiar to most children, say, a trip to the grocery store or some other everyday adventure."

Both text and illustrations of Ted and Nina Go to the Grocery Store can be found online in this digital story book.

Marguerite de Angeli later won the Newbery Medal for excellence in American children's literature for another book, her 1949 The Door in the Wall. Helen Ferris later shared authorship with Eleanor Roosevelt in their Partners: The United Nations and Youth.
