= Geneva Smitherman =

American academic

Geneva Smitherman is a professor emeritus of English and co-founder of the African American and African Studies doctoral program at Michigan State University. Smitherman co-founded the first public African-centered elementary school in the country, Malcolm X Academy, in the Detroit Public Schools Community District. She is also known as Dr. G and Dr. Smitherman.

== Biography ==
The oldest of seven children in Brownsville, Tennessee, Smitherman started her education in a one-room schoolhouse. Her family moved from the rural south to the urban north as part of the Great African American Migration, first living in Chicago for a few years and then moving to Detroit. She graduated from Detroit's Cass Technical High School and earned a B.A. and M.A. in English and Latin from Wayne State University and a Ph.D. in English with a specialization in sociolinguistics and education from the University of Michigan.

== Professional accomplishments ==
In 1971, she was among the original faculty members of Harvard University's Afro-American Studies program. In addition to working at Michigan State University in the Department of English and co-founding MSU's African American and African Studies program, Smitherman has been active in advocating for African American children's education.

In the late 1970s, she was an expert witness and advocate in the federal court case Martin Luther King Junior Elementary School Children et al. v. Ann Arbor School District. A key claim in what was later called the Ann Arbor Decision recognized African-American English as a language and established that Ann Arbor Public Schools violated federal statutory law because they failed to take into account this home language in the provision of education. The judge ordered the school district to find a way to identify African-American English speakers in schools and to "use that knowledge in teaching such students how to read standard English".

Smitherman’s book, Talkin and Testifyin: The Language of Black America, published in 1977 by Wayne State University Press, contributed to shifting public and academic perspectives towards the value of African-American Vernacular English (AAVE). This work has been widely referenced by teachers, legal scholars, sociologists, and policy analysts.

In 1991, Smitherman, Clifford Watson, and several Detroit parents established the Malcolm X Academy, an African-centered, predominantly male, preK-8 school within the Detroit Public Schools Community District. It was the first public African-centered elementary school in the country.

Smitherman is author and editor/co-editor of 15 books and monographs and over 125 articles, essays, and published opinion pieces.

== Awards and achievements ==
- 1999 Conference on College Composition and Communication Exemplar Award
- 2001 National Council of Teachers of English David H. Russell Research Award for Talkin That Talk: Language, Culture and Education in African America
- 2005 National Council of Teachers of English James R. Squire Award
- 2024 Michigan Women's Hall of Fame

The National Council of Teachers of English established an award in her name to support teachers from historically underrepresented groups.

== Publications ==
=== Books ===
- Talkin and Testifyin: The Language of Black America (Wayne State University Press, 1977)
- Discourse and Discrimination (co-editor with Teun A. van Dijk) (Wayne State University Press, 1988)
- Black Talk: Words and Phrases from the Hood to the Amen Corner (Houghton Mifflin, 1994)
- Talkin That Talk: Language, Culture and Education in African America (Routledge, 2000)
- Black Linguistics: Language, Society, and Politics in Africa and the Americas (co-editor with Arnetha Ball, Sinfree Makoni, and Arthur K. Spears) (Psychology Press, 2003)
- Language Diversity in the Classroom: From Intention to Practice (co-editor with Victor Villanueva) (Southern Illinois University Press, 2003)
- Word from the Mother: Language and African Americans (Routledge, 2006)
- Articulate While Black: Barack Obama, Language, and Race in the U.S. (co-author with H. Samy Alim) (Oxford University Press, 2012)
- My Soul Look Back in Wonder: Memories from a Life of Study, Struggle, and Doin Battle in the Language Wars (Routledge, 2022)

=== Articles and book chapters ===
- "The Chain Remain the Same": Communicative Practices in the Hip Hop Nation," Journal of Black Studies, 28.1 (September 1997)
- "CCCC’s Role in the Struggle for Language Rights," College Composition and Communication (February 1999)
- "Language and Democracy in the United States of America and South Africa," in Language and Institutions in Africa (eds., Sinfree Makoni and Nkonko Kamwangamalu, 2001)
