= Memoir (disambiguation) =

Memoir is a literary genre or a reminiscence, a subclass of autobiography.

Memoir may also refer to:

== Autobiographical texts ==
- Memoir (McGahern book), a 2005 autobiographical account of the childhood of Irish author John McGahern
- Memoirs (Walter Scott), a short autobiographical work by Walter Scott
- Mémoires (Berlioz) (aka Mémoires de Hector Berlioz), an autobiography by French composer Hector Berlioz
- Mémoires, a 1959 artists' book by Guy Debord and Asger Jorn
- Memoirs: 1939–1993, a memoir written by the former Prime Minister of Canada Brian Mulroney

== Professional society journals ==
For example:

- Memoirs and Proceedings of the Chemical Society, a scientific journal published at various times by the UK Chemical Society
- Memoirs of the American Mathematical Society, a mathematical journal in which each memoir is normally a single, separately bound monograph

== Music ==
- European Memoirs (aka Memoir), a 1982 jazz album by the Toshiko Akiyoshi – Lew Tabackin Big Band
- Memoire (album) (or Memoire DX), the debut album by Japanese rock band Malice Mizer
- Memoirs (Rox album), the debut album by British singer Rox
- Memoirs (jazz album), a 1990 album by Paul Bley, Charlie Haden and Paul Motian
- "Memoir", a song by Audio Adrenaline from the 1996 album Bloom
- Memoirs, a 2002 album by the Third and the Mortal

== Other uses ==
- Mémoire, in French culture, a (usually short and incisive) piece of writing allowing the author to show his or her opinion on a given subject
- Memoir '44, a light war-themed strategy board game
- Memoirs v. Massachusetts, a 1966 US Supreme Court obscenity case
- Memoir (horse)
- Memoirs (film), a 1984 drama film
