= Black Fox of Lorne =

Book by Marguerite De Angeli

- First edition
- Author: Marguerite de Angeli
- Illustrator: Marguerite de Angeli
- Genre: Adventure, Fiction, Historical Fiction
- Publisher: Doubleday
- Publication date: 1956
- Media type: Print (Hardcover)
- Pages: 191

Black Fox of Lorne is a 1956 children's historical novel written and illustrated by Marguerite de Angeli. This Newbery Honor Book is about tenth-century Viking twins who shipwreck on the Scottish coast and seek to avenge the death of their father. They encounter loyal clansmen at war, kindly shepherds, power-hungry lairds, and staunch crofters.

Author Marguerite de Angeli had earlier won the Newbery Medal for excellence in American children's literature for her 1949 novel The Door in the Wall.
