= Bright April =

Book by Marguerite De Angeli

- First edition, 1946
- Author: Marguerite de Angeli
- Illustrator: Marguerite de Angeli
- Language: English
- Genre: Children's novel
- Published: 1946 (Doubleday & Co)
- Publication place: United States
- Pages: 88 pp
- OCLC: 8739451

Bright April is a 1946 children's story book written and illustrated by Marguerite de Angeli, who later won the 1950 Newbery Medal for excellence in American children's literature for The Door in the Wall. Bright April is a story about a young African-American girl named April who experiences racial prejudice; it is also the story of her bright personality and her tenth birthday and the surprise it brought. The story is set in the Germantown neighborhood of Philadelphia, Pennsylvania, and the scenery portrayed in the author's illustrations can be recognized even today.

Bright April was the first children's book to address the divisive issue of racial prejudice, a daring topic for a children's book of that time. Selected digital images of this book are available at the Marguerite de Angeli Collection. Bright April is available for loan at the Open Library. Bright April was republished by Purple House Press in November, 2020.
