= Victor Villanueva =

American educator and scholar (born 1948)

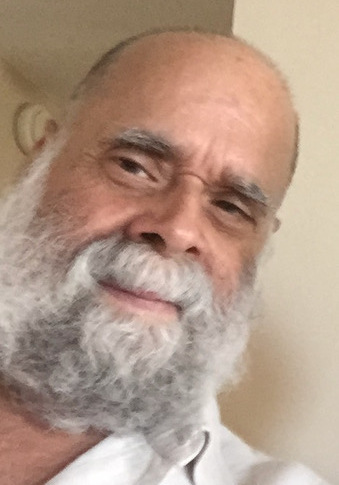
- Born: 1948 (age 77–78); New York City, U.S.

Academic background
- Education: University of Washington

Academic work
- Discipline: Composition studies; rhetoric
- Institutions: Washington State University

Victor Villanueva (born 1948) is an American academic and scholar in rhetoric and composition studies, serving the role of Regents Professor Emeritus at Washington State University. Villanueva was awarded NCTE's David Russell Award for Distinguished Research in the Teaching of English for his groundbreaking book Bootstraps, From an American Academic of Color. In 2009, Villanueva was the recipient of the Conference on College Composition and Communication Exemplar's Award. Villanueva has written and edited a number of significant works on the topic of race, rhetoric, basic writing, and the social and political contexts of literacy education.

== Biography ==
=== Education ===
Victor Villanueva received his PhD in English with an emphasis in Rhetoric and Writing from the University of Washington in 1986. His BA and MA in English were also both awarded from the University of Washington.

=== Teaching career ===
Villanueva has been teaching rhetoric and writing for over thirty years at a number of institutions. Villanueva began his teaching career at Big Bend Community College in Moses Lake, Washington, before moving on to a variety of positions at the University of Washington, the University of Missouri-Kansas City, Northern Arizona University, and Auburn University. The majority of his academic career has been at Washington State University.

== Research contributions ==
While Villanueva's scholarship has contributed widely across rhetoric, composition, and writing studies, some of his most influential work has been in the often-intersecting area of rhetoric, racism, and literacy. His book Bootstraps: From an American Academic of Color, which won the NCTE David H Russell Award for Distinguish Research in the Teaching of English and the Conference on English Education (CEE) Richard Meade Award for Research in English Education, explored problems related to race, marginalization, and identity within U.S. literacy education through the telling of his own autobiography as a Puerto Rican negotiating the American public school system. Villanueva is also well known for his work on the edited collection Cross-Talk in Comp Theory: A Reader, which was one of the first and most widely used books on composition (writing) theory. Another theme in Villanueva's later work was the rhetoric of memory, especially in conjunction with identity.

== Published works ==
- Villanueva, Victor. "Mode Meshing: Before the New World Was New." Talking Back: Senior Scholars and Their Colleagues Deliberate the Past, Present, and Future of Writing Studies, edited by Norbert Elliot et al., Utah State University Press, 2020, pp. 343–353.
- Villanueva, Victor, and Zarah C. Moeggenberg. "A Tale of Two Generations: How We Were Taught, and What We Learned (or Not)." Journal of Basic Writing, vol. 37, no. 1, Jan. 2018, pp. 35–55.
- Villanueva, Victor. "Calling a White a White." Rhetorics of Whiteness: Postracial Haunting in Popular Culture, Social Media, and Education, edited by Tammie M. Kennedy et al., Southern Illinois University Press, 2017, pp. 253–254.
- Villanueva, Victor. "'I Am Two Parts': Collective Subjectivity and the Leader of Academics and the Othered." College English, vol. 79, no. 5, May 2017, pp. 482–494.
- Selfe, Cynthia, Villanueva, Victor, and Steve Parks. "Generating the Field: The Role of Editors in Disciplinary Formation." Composition Forum, vol. 35, 2017.
- Eddy, Robert, and Victor Villanueva. A Language and Power Reader: Representations of Race in a "Post-Racist" Era. Utah State University Press, 2014.
- Villanueva, Victor. "Subversive Complicity and Basic Writing Across the Curriculum." Journal of Basic Writing, vol. 32, no. 1, 2013, pp. 97–110.
- Villanueva, Victor, and Kristin L. Arola. Cross-Talk in Comp Theory: A Reader. National Council of Teachers of English (NCTE), 2011.
- Villanueva, Victor. "Of Kin and Community." English Journal, vol. 101, no. 1, Sept. 2011, pp. 108–110.
- Villanueva, Victor. "Reflections on Style and the Love of Language." College Composition and Communication, vol. 62, no. 4, June 2011, pp. 726–738.
- Villanueva, Victor. "2009 CCCC Exemplar Award Acceptance Speech." College Composition and Communication, vol. 61, no. 3, Feb. 2010, pp. 581–582.
- Villanueva, Victor. "Reflections." Cross-Language Relations in Composition, edited by Bruce Horner et al., Southern Illinois University Press, 2010, pp. 244–248.
- Villanueva, Victor. "Colonial Memory and the Crime of Rhetoric: Pedro Albizu Campos." College English, vol. 71, no. 6, July 2009, pp. 630–638.
- Baca, Damián, and Victor Villanueva. "Writing, Rhetoric, and Latinidad." College English, vol. 71, no. 6, July 2009, pp. 561–646.
- Villanueva, Victor. "3D Stereotypes: Crash." College English, vol. 69, no. 4, Mar. 2007, pp. 348–350.
- Villanueva, Victor. "Blind: Talking about the New Racism." The Writing Center Journal, vol. 26, no. 1, 2006, pp. 3–19.
- Villanueva, Victor, et al. "Research in Rhetoric." Research on Composition: Multiple Perspectives on Two Decades of Change, edited by Peter Smagorinsky, Teachers College Press, 2006, pp. 170–186.
- Villanueva, Victor. "'Memoria' Is a Friend of Ours: On the Discourse of Color." College English, vol. 67, no. 1, 2004, pp. 9–19.
- Monroe, Barbara, and Victor Villanueva. Crossing the Digital Divide: Race, Writing, and Technology in the Classroom. Teachers College Press, 2004.
- Villanueva, Victor. "Rhetoric from/of Color /." College English, vol. 67, no. 1, Sept. 2004, pp. 9–120.
- Geneva Smitherman, and Victor Villanueva. Language Diversity in the Classroom : From Intention to Practice. Southern Illinois University Press, 2003.
- Villanueva, Victor. "When the Multicultural Leaves the Race: Some Common Terms Reconsidered." The Relevance of English: Teaching That Matters in Students' Lives, edited by Robert P. Yagelski et al., National Council of Teachers of English (NCTE), 2002, pp. 36–51.
- Villanueva, Victor. "On the Rhetoric and Precedents of Racism." College Composition and Communication, vol. 50, no. 4, June 1999, pp. 645–661.
- Villanueva, Victor. "Theory in the Basic Writing Classroom? A Practice." Journal of Basic Writing, vol. 16, Apr. 1997, pp. 79–90.
- Villanueva, Victor. "Whose Voice Is It Anyway? Rodriguez' Speech in Retrospect." English Journal, vol. 76, Dec. 1987, pp. 17–21.

== National Awards ==
- Exemplar, Conference on College Composition and Communications, 2009.
- Advancement of People of Color Leadership Award, National Council of Teachers of English, 2008.
- Rhetorician of the Year, Young Rhetoricians Conference, 1999.
- David H. Russell Award for Distinguished Research and Scholarship in English, the National Council of Teachers of English, 1995.
- Richard A. Meade Award for Distinguished Research in English Education, the Conference on English Education, 1994.

== See also ==
- Bootstraps: From an American Academic of Color
- Conference on College Composition and Communication
- Composition Studies
