= Bootstraps: From an American Academic of Color =

1993 book by Victor Villanueva

- Author: Victor Villanueva
- Language: English
- Publication date: 1993
- ISBN: 0814103774

Bootstraps: From an American Academic of Color (ISBN 0814103774) is a book by Washington State University Regents Professor Victor Villanueva, published in 1993 by the National Council of Teachers of English (NCTE). Bootstraps uses Villanueva's personal history as a struggling Puerto Rican academic to initiate a broader discussion of race and language in academia.

The book is notable for introducing the concept of Puerto Rican rhetoric in English. Villanueva initially believed the book's personal critique of the obstacles he faced as a Puerto Rican academic would "end his academic career," and later expressed surprise at its success. Later academics of color have referenced the book as "significant" in conceptualizing the relationship between people of color and fluency in English.
