= Keith Jessop =

British salvage diver and treasure hunter

Keith Jessop (10 May 1933 – 22 May 2010) was a British salvage diver and marine treasure hunter.

== History ==
=== Early life ===
Born in Keighley, West Riding of Yorkshire, as the son of a Yorkshire mill-worker. Jessop learned to deep-dive.

With advances in technology, which allowed longer and deeper dives than ever could be imagined before, his dream of becoming a deep-sea salvager became a reality. Jessop became professionally trained in deep-sea diving and over several decades Jessop had unearthed hundreds of wrecks around the world, making several million pounds from his discoveries.

=== Salvage operations ===
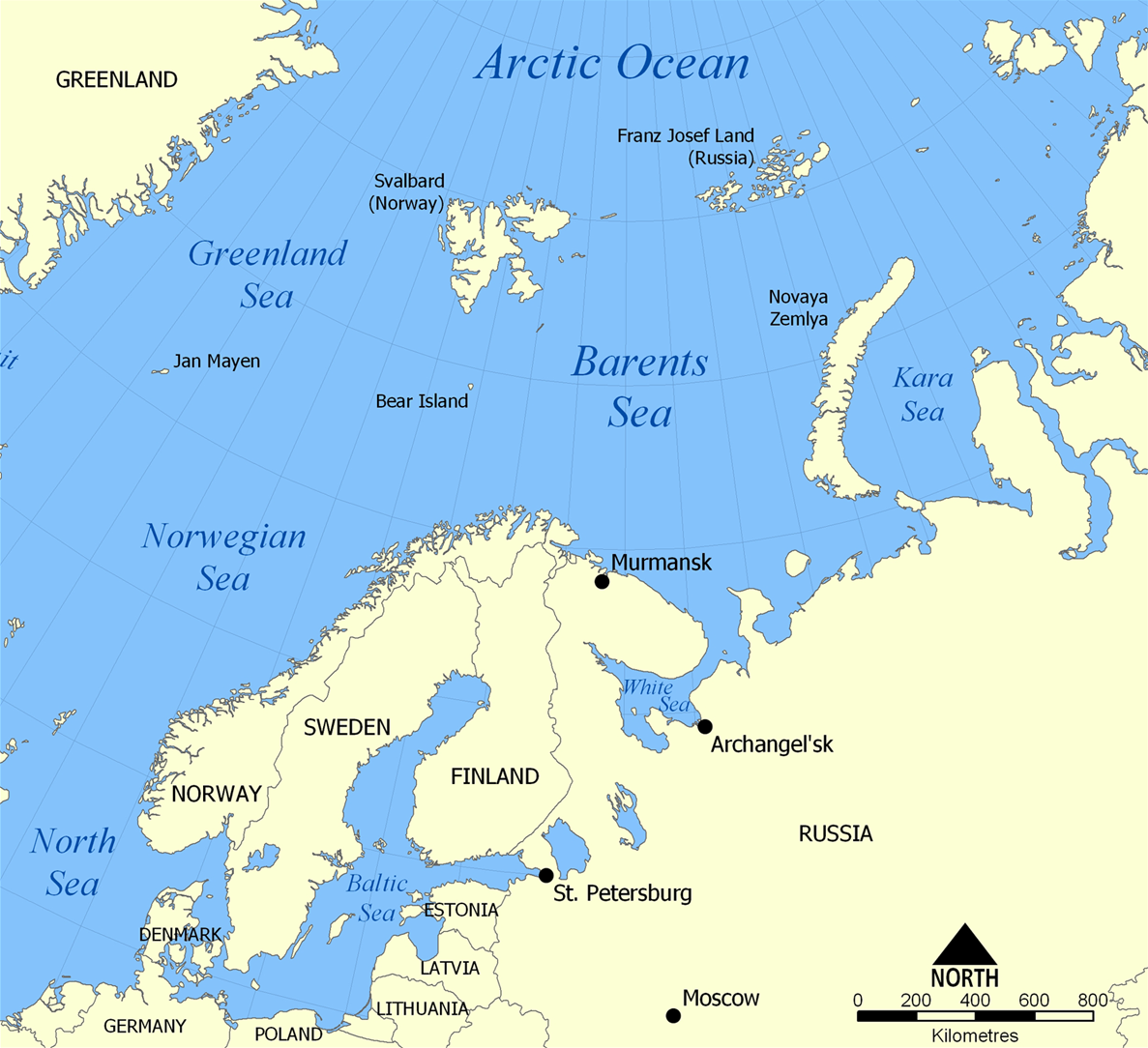
Jessop recovered the gold from the sunken HMS Edinburgh at the bottom of the Barents Sea in 1981.

In April 1981 Jessop's chartered survey ship Dammtor began searching for the wreck of the cruiser HMS Edinburgh in the Barents Sea in the Arctic Ocean of the coast of Russia. The ship had been sunk in battle in 1942 during the Second World War while carrying payment for military equipment from Murmansk in Russia to Scotland. His company, Jessop Marine, won the contract for the salvage rights to the wreck of Edinburgh because his methods, involving cutting machinery and divers, were deemed more appropriate for a war grave, compared to the explosives-oriented methods of other companies.

In late April 1981, the survey ship discovered the wrecks location at an approximate position of 72.00°N, 35.00°E, at a depth of 245 metres (804 ft) within ten days of the start of the operation. Using specialist camera equipment, the Dammtor took detailed film of the Edinburgh, which allowed Jessop and his divers to plan the salvage operation.

Later that year, on 30 August, the dive-support vessel Stephaniturm had arrived at the site, and salvage operations began. By mid-September of that year Jessop's team was able to salvage from the wreck over $100,000,000 in Russian gold bullion—431 bars out of 465.

His autobiography Goldfinder written in 2001 tells the story of Jessop's life and the salvage of such underwater treasures as HMS Edinburgh.

Jessop's son Graham was also a successful deep-sea salvage diver.

=== Death ===
Jessop died in France on 22 May 2010, aged 77.
