= Confessions of an Actor =

Confessions of an Actor: An Autobiography
- Hardcover Cover
- Author: Laurence Olivier
- Language: English
- Genre: Autobiography
- Publisher: Simon & Schuster
- Publication date: May 1982
- Publication place: United Kingdom
- Media type: Print (Hardcover and Paperback)
- Pages: 348
- ISBN: 0-671-41701-0 (Hardcover edition)
- OCLC: 8785331
- Dewey Decimal: 792/.028/0924 B 19
- LC Class: PN2598.O55 A33 1982

Confessions of an Actor is Laurence Olivier's autobiography. It was published in 1982, seven years before the actor's death.
