= Kashmir Udaas Hai =

1950 book by Mehmood Hashmi

- Author: Mehmood Hashmi
- Original title: کشمیر اداس ہے
- Cover artist: Saleem Raza
- Language: Urdu
- Subject: Autobiography, Memoir
- Genre: Non-fiction
- Publisher: Al-Faisal Publishers
- Publication date: 1950 (First Edition)
- Publication place: Pakistan
- Media type: Hardcover
- Pages: 368
- ISBN: 969-503-112-9

Kashmir Udaas Hai (Urdu: کشمیر اداس ہے) is a book that was written by a Kashmiri journalist and education specialist Mehmood Hashmi.
