= Lawyering (book) =

1976 book by Helene E. Schwartz

- Cover
- Author: Helene E. Schwartz
- Language: English
- Genre: Autobiography
- Publisher: Farrar, Straus and Giroux, McGraw Hill Toronto
- Publication date: 1976
- Publication place: United States
- Pages: 308

Lawyering is a 1976 autobiography by Helene E. Schwartz detailing her first decade as a lawyer. It was published in the United States and Canada.

== Summary ==
Lawyering is an autobiography of Helene Schwartz's first decade as a lawyer, which shows her struggles in what used to be a man-dominated field of work. After graduating from Columbia Law School in 1965, Schwartz had trouble finding a job until she began working part-time in a New York law firm. When the law firm was tasked with helping Republicans defend The National Review from a libel suit by scientist Linus Pauling, Schwartz provided the defense. Due to not having a chance to work in a partnership as a woman lawyer, Schwartz left the law firm and was hired to appeal the Chicago Eight trial. Schwartz defended anti-Vietnam War protestors and those who protested against policies made by the Richard Nixon administration. Much of the book deals with how she and other women lawyers were treated in courtrooms, while also focusing on her becoming interested in the feminist movement.

== Publication ==
The book was published in the United States and Canada in 1976. Schwartz wrote in the book's preface, "My being a woman is not the central focus of this book, but it is necessarily a leitmotif. I can't discuss my cases without writing about the effect that being a woman has had on my career as a lawyer."

== Reception ==
Mike Gigandet, of The Daily News Journal, said that Lawyering "is not a diatribe about her treatment as a lawyer", but that "it is an honest and convincing account" of how Schwartz was treated. The Santa Clara Law Review wrote that the book provides "a fascinating glimpse into the unpublicized procedures of litigation". Ann McGlinn, writing for The Saturday Evening Post, compared Schwartz's writing of "the first seven pages to a Cinderella story by Adela Rogers St. Johns".
