= Jakhan Choto Chilam =

- Author: Satyajit Ray
- Genre: Autobiography
- Publisher: Ananda Publishers
- Publication date: 1982

Jakhan Choto Chilam (English meaning-When I was a kid) is a 1982 autobiographical book by the famed film director Satyajit Ray. In this book, Ray discusses his childhood days in the city of Kolkata (then Calcutta), India from eyes of an everyday boy.
