= Memoirs of a Professional Cad =

Autobiography Of George Sanders

- Author: George Sanders
- Language: English
- Genre: Memoir, autobiography
- Publisher: Avon
- Publication date: 1960
- Publication place: United States
- Media type: Print

Memoirs of a Professional Cad is a 1960 autobiography by the actor George Sanders. It includes accounts of his marriage and friendship with Zsa Zsa Gabor and of working with filmmakers like Roberto Rossellini.

The original 1960 edition book's cover art was done by caricaturist Sam Norkin.
