= Goldfinder =

Autobiography of British diver and treasure hunter Keith Jessop

- Author: Keith Jessop, Neil Hanson
- Publisher: Wiley
- Publication date: February 28, 2002
- Pages: 432
- ISBN: 9780471045465

Goldfinder is a 2001 autobiography of British diver and treasure hunter Keith Jessop. It tells the story of Jessop's life and salvaging such underwater treasures as HMS Edinburgh.

One day in April 1981 Jessop's survey ship Dammtor began searching for the wreck of HMS Edinburgh in the Barents Sea in the Arctic Ocean of the coast of Russia. The ship had been sunk in battle in 1942 during World War II while carrying payment for military equipment from Murmansk in Russia to Scotland. His company, Jessop Marine, won the contract for the salvage rights to the wreck of Edinburgh because his methods, involving complex cutting machinery and divers, were deemed more appropriate for a war grave, compared to the explosives-oriented methods of other companies.

In late April 1981, the survey ship discovered the ship's final resting place at an approximate position of 72.00°N, 35.00°E, at a depth of 245 metres (804 ft) within ten days of the start of the operation. Using specialist camera equipment, Dammtor took detailed film of the wreck, which allowed Jessop and his divers to carefully plan the salvage operation.

Later that year, on 30 August, the dive-support vessel Stephaniturm journeyed to the site, and salvage operations began in earnest. Leading the operation undersea, by mid-September of that year Jessop was able to salvage over $100,000,000 in Russian gold bullion (431 bars) from the wreck out of 465.
