= The Bookseller's Tale =

Autobiography

- Front cover of The Bookseller's Tale
- Author: Martin Latham
- Language: English
- Subject: Books
- Published: 3 September 2020
- Publisher: Particular Books, Penguin Random House UK
- Publication place: United Kingdom
- Pages: 349
- ISBN: 9780141991238

The Bookseller's Tale is a 2020 autobiographical and historical book written by English bookseller Martin Latham. The book is written in an essay style format, with chapters discussing historical and modern libraries, the history of the bookselling trade and personal stories from Latham's career as a bookseller.

The book received positive reviews from The Guardian and The Times Literary Supplement, and was featured in editor's choice lists published by The Standard and The Spectator.

== Author and background ==
Bookseller Martin Latham opened the Canterbury branch of Waterstones in 1990, having been selling books for six years prior. Gaining knowledge and interest from interactions with customers, Latham kept conversations with customers going whilst working. Latham had ordered over 35,000 books for the chain, with a month spent assessing publishers in his own time. The founder of Waterstones, Tim Waterstone, visited the store at this time, and described the store as not having "that Aladdin's Cave feeling." The store was also subsequently visited by author Laurie R. King. Latham filed a petty cash claim at the Canterbury chain as part of funding a Roman bath house, visible through glass. Considering bookshops as an "area of refuge", Latham took inspiration from his encounters with customers for The Bookseller's Tale, and English non-fiction writers such as George Orwell and Olivia Laing.

== Outline ==
The Bookseller's Tale focuses on Latham's view of book obsession, exploring the history of book stalls, book lice, famous historic and modern ibraries such as the Grand Library of Baghdad and the Laurentian Library. The book also discusses the opening of the Canterbury chain of the bookstore Waterstones and Latham's career as a bookseller. Autobiographic parts of Latham's life are also discussed, such as his father's book collecting, which is attributed to his abandonment by his parents as a child.

== Reception ==
Katy Guest of The Guardian described it as "a celebration of all things bookish" and assured that book-enjoyers would "come away with something unexpected" and "reassuring". Writing for The Times Literary Supplement, Dennis Duncan referred to the book as a "series of garrulous sorties around certain bookish themes", describe Latham's tone as "not too careful about facts", however felt the style was "humane". Duncan also acknowledged the separation between "highbrow and lowbrow literature", highlighting the example used by Latham of novelist A. S. Byatt not wanting to be seen buying Discworld in London.

Pittenweem Community Library recommended the book, praising the commentary on book smuggling to avoid censorship and coverage on Scottish historian Andrew Pettegree. Alanna Jenkins criticised the book for "feeling cold at times", attributing it to reading like a "textbook". Jenkins also expressed disappointment with the lack of personal story provided by Latham, calling the book a "reluctant memoir". Terry Potter of The Letterpress Project praised the historical discussion on booksellers of the Seine embankment and the book stores that used to trade on Book Row in New York City. Similar to Jenkins however, Potter equated the book to a "set of essays", rather than a "tale" and described the style as "lacking fizz", however said that due to the book not requiring cover to cover reading, the book would "have something for every reader to enjoy and get involved in." Ross Bradshaw of the Five Leaves Bookshop in Nottingham referred to the book as "cool and modern", referencing the inclusion of philosophers Mikhail Bakhtin and Walter Benjamin. Despite this, Bradshaw did note a historical error regarding Leon Kramer, which states in the book that he "founded the world’s first Yiddish newspaper” from his bookshop", when by this time Forverts already had a print circulation of 120,000. The Bibliophibian commented on the muddling of the book, saying it was a mixture of history book and autobiography, whilst focusing too much on the physical "codex" of books rather than their contents.

The Bookseller's Tale was featured in The London Standard's "Best books of 2020" editor's choice list, with Katie Law describing the book as a "love letter", with anecdotes presented to demonstrate the emotional and physical "power of books". The Spectator also included the book on their 2020 reviewer's choice list.
