= Henner's Lydia =

- First edition (publ. Doubleday)
- Author: Marguerite de Angeli
- Language: English
- Publication date: 1936

Henner's Lydia is a 1936 children's story book written and illustrated by Marguerite de Angeli, winner of the 1950 Newbery Medal for excellence in American children's literature for another book, The Door in the Wall. Henner's Lydia is a story about a young Amish girl named Lydia Stoltzfus and her "Pop" Henner, or Henry. The story is set in Lancaster County, Pennsylvania.

The landscape portrayed in the author's illustrated endpapers of the book can be easily discerned in the real landscape today, but for the movement of the location of a small stone quarry in the illustration, probably for artistic balance. Many of the illustrations in the book were sketched by the author at the site of the little red schoolhouse that still stands at the intersection of Pennsylvania Route 23 and Red Schoolhouse Road west of Morgantown, Pennsylvania.
