= Westlife: Our Story =

Autobiographical book by Westlife

Westlife – Our Story
- Hardback cover version
- Author: Nicky Byrne; Kian Egan; Mark Feehily; Shane Filan
- Language: English; German
- Genre: Autobiography
- Publisher: HarperCollins (United Kingdom)
- Publication date: 16 June 2008 (hardback); 28 May 2009 (paperback)
- Publication place: Ireland
- Media type: Print (Hardback, Paperback)
- Pages: 306

Westlife – Our Story is the autobiographical book by the Irish boyband Westlife, released by HarperCollins (United Kingdom) on 16 June 2008. The book tells the story of their lives for the past ten years, from how it started in Sligo to today's multi-platinum record charters, along with private pictures of the members, exclusively to the book.

Westlife launched this book by doing signings around the United Kingdom and Ireland. They also released a German version of the book in December 2008, and an Australian version on 8 January 2009.

They released a paperback version of the book with different cover on 28 May 2009. It includes their say regarding their Croke Park gig and an additional audio CD with greetings from each one of them. The book was said to be written by each group member for three months.

It went to #1 in UK and Irish Charts and tagged as The Sunday Times' Number One Bestseller.
