= They Called Me the Catch Me Killer =

They Called Me the Catch Me Killer is an autobiographical book written by Bob Erler with the help of John C. Souter.

Bob Erler was working as a policeman when he was charged and convicted of murder, though it is heavily implied that he is innocent. The book then follows Bob through his years in prison and his escape that ends after a great while with being shot by the police and met with the compassion of the local sheriff. Bob then turns to Jesus and claims to be a Christian, but gradually loses his devotion to Jesus as it seems that he might be released. He then comes back to Christ and his guilt regarding the murder he actually committed makes him withdraw from the juridical process of having the trial's decision overturned. He then proceeds with his life in prison and becomes a spiritual leader in the prison, converting many inmates and even prison guards to Jesus Christ. Bob Erler was eventually released and became a Christian evangelist.
