= Marguerite de Angeli =

American novelist (1889–1987)

- Born: 14 March 1889; Lapeer, Michigan
- Died: 16 June 1987 (aged 98); Philadelphia, Pennsylvania, US
- Occupation: Writer
- Spouse(s): John Dailey de Angeli, a violinist, known as Dai
- Writing career
- Period: 1924–1981
- Genres: Children's and adult novels and short fiction, fantasy

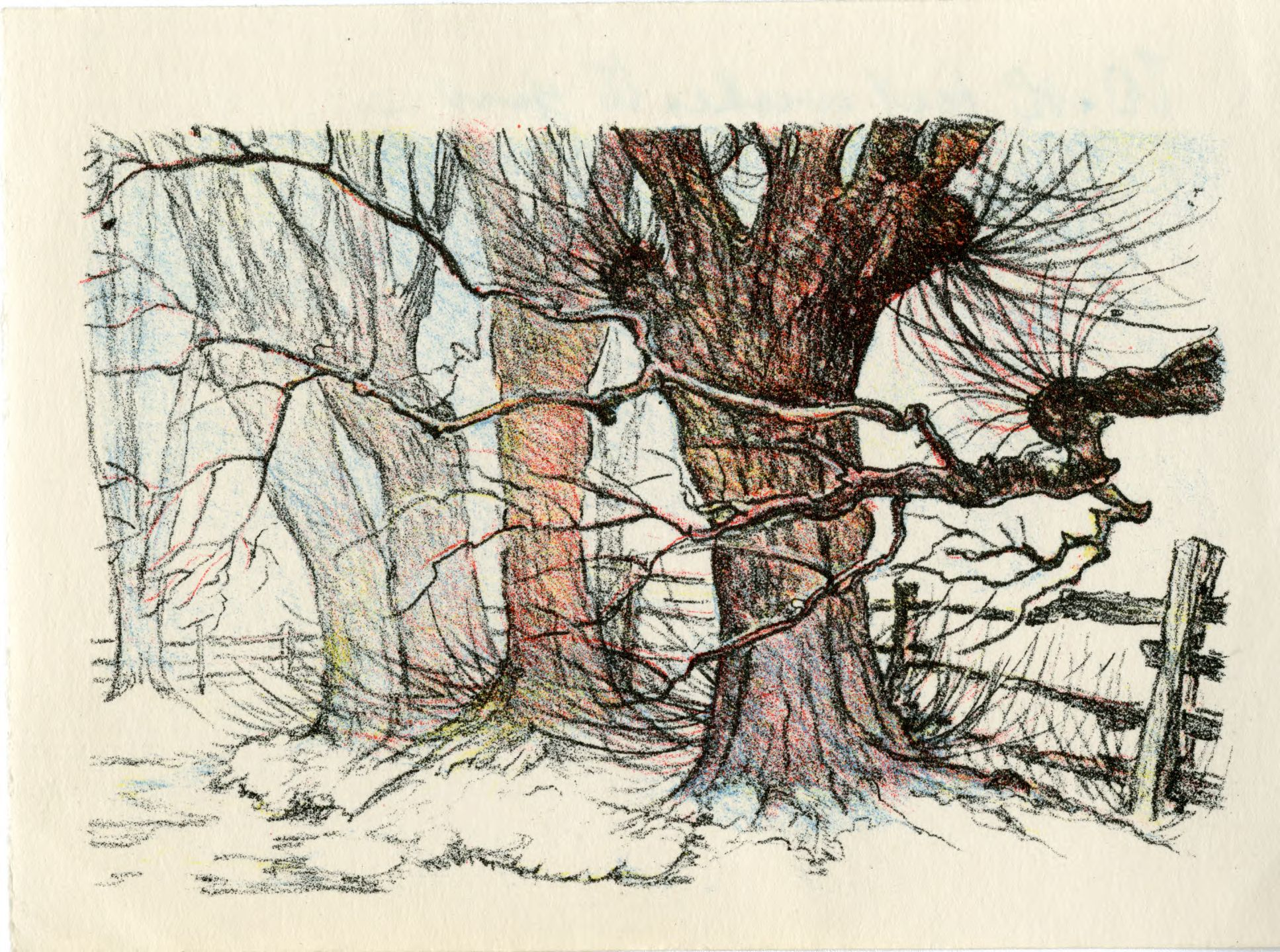
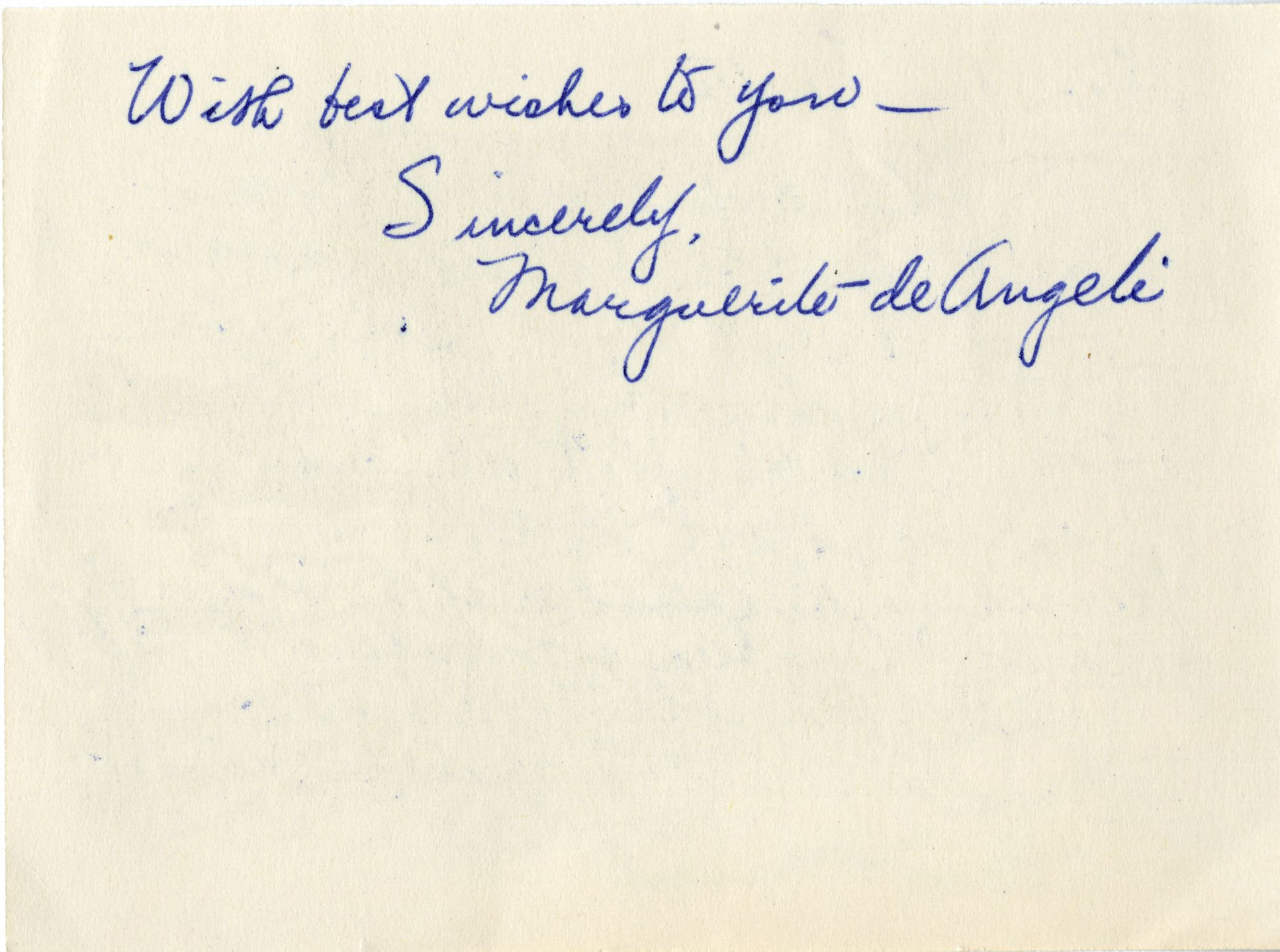
Illustration and signature of Marguerite de Angeli

Marguerite de Angeli (March 14, 1889 – June 16, 1987) was an American writer and illustrator of children's books including the 1950 Newbery Award winning book The Door in the Wall. She wrote and illustrated twenty-eight of her own books, and illustrated more than three dozen books and numerous magazine stories and articles for other authors.

== Early life ==
De Angeli was born Marguerite Lofft in Lapeer, Michigan, one of six children. Her father, George Shadrach Lofft, was a photographer and illustrator; her mother was Ruby Adele Tuttle Lofft. Her grandfather was the town blacksmith. In 1902, her family moved to West Philadelphia, where she spent her most formative years. She entered high school in 1904, but a year later, at age fifteen, began to sing professionally as contralto in a Presbyterian choir for $1 a week. She soon withdrew from high school for more musical training.

== Personal life ==
In 1908, she met John Dailey de Angeli, a violinist, known as Dai. They were married in Toronto on April 12, 1910. The first of their six children, John Shadrach de Angeli, was born one year later. After living in many locations in the American and Canadian West, they settled in the Philadelphia suburb of Collingswood, New Jersey. There, in 1921, Marguerite started to study drawing under her mentor, Maurice Bower. In 1922, Marguerite began illustrating a Sunday School paper and was soon doing illustrations for magazines such as The Country Gentleman, Ladies' Home Journal, and The American Girl, besides illustrating books for authors including Helen Ferris, Elsie Singmaster, Cornelia Meigs, and Dorothy Canfield Fisher. Her last child, Maurice Bower de Angeli, was born in 1928, seven years before the 1935 publication of her first book, Ted and Nina Go to the Grocery Store. The de Angeli family moved frequently, returning to Pennsylvania and living north of Philadelphia in Jenkintown, west of Philadelphia in the Manoa neighborhood of Havertown, on Carpenter Lane in Germantown, Philadelphia, on Panama Street in Center City, Philadelphia, in an apartment near the Philadelphia Museum of Art, and in a cottage in Green Lane, Pennsylvania. They also maintained a summer cabin on Money Island in Toms River, New Jersey. Marguerite's husband died in 1969, eight months before their 60th wedding anniversary.

== Later years ==
In 1971, two years after her husband died, de Angeli published her autobiography, Butter at the Old Price. Her last work, Friendship and Other Poems, was published in 1981 when she was 92 years old. She died at the age of 98 on June 16, 1987, in Philadelphia, Pennsylvania. She was survived by 3 of her 4 sons: Arthur, Harry and Maurice; daughter, Nina Kuhn; 13 grandchildren, and 16 great-grandchildren.

== Illustrations ==
In her illustrations Marguerite de Angeli employed a number of different media, including charcoal, pen and ink, lithograph (only in earliest work), oils, and watercolors. Philadelphia, Pennsylvania, is the regional setting of many, but not all, of her books.

== Themes ==
Her work explored and depicted the traditions and rich cultural diversity of common people more frequently overlooked – a semi-autobiographical Great Depression family, African American children experiencing the sting of racial prejudice, Polish mine workers aspiring to life beyond the Pennsylvania coal mines, the physically handicapped, colonial Mennonites, the Amish, nineteenth-century Quakers supporting the underground railroad, immigrants, and other traditional or ethnic peoples. De Angeli's books carry an underlying message that we are really all the same, and that all of us deserve tolerance, care, consideration, and respect.

== Awards ==
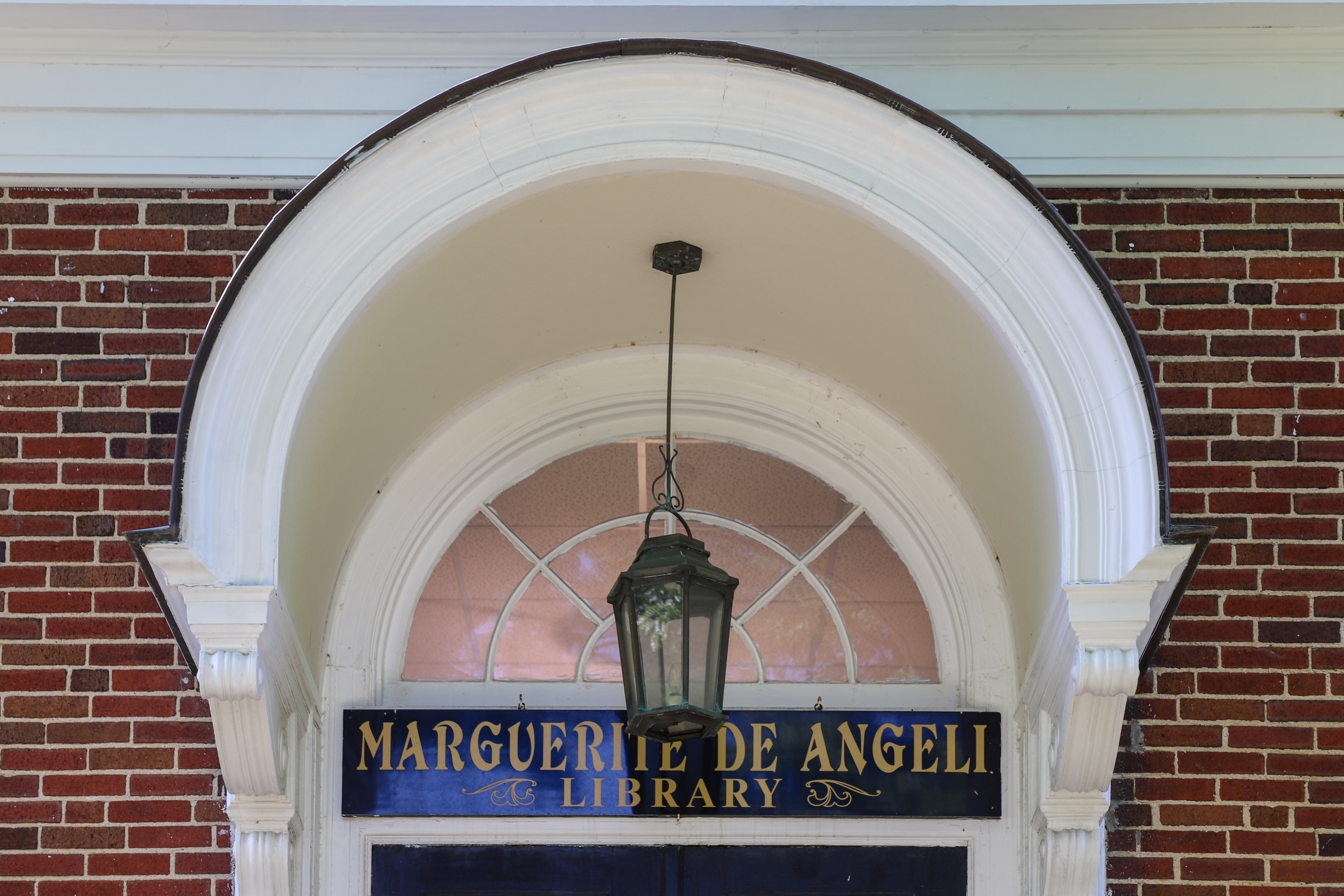
Marguerite deAngeli Library

De Angeli's 1946 story, Bright April, was the first children's book to address the divisive issue of racial prejudice. The book won the Spring Book Festival.

She was twice named a Caldecott Honor Book illustrator, first in 1945 for Yonie Wondernose and again in 1955 for Book of Nursery and Mother Goose Rhymes. She received a 1950 Newbery Medal, for The Door in the Wall, which also won the Lewis Carroll Shelf Award in 1961, a 1957 Newbery Honor mention for Black Fox of Lorne, a 1961 Lewis Carroll Shelf Award, and the 1968 Regina Medal.

De Angeli was named a Distinguished Daughter of Pennsylvania in 1958.

In 1981, Lapeer's public library was renamed the Marguerite deAngeli Branch of the Lapeer District Library.

== Works ==
=== Nonfiction for adults ===
- Libraries and Reading: Their Importance in the Lives of Famous Americans with others, edited by Donald H. Hunt (1964)
- Butter at the Old Price: The Autobiography of Marguerite de Angeli (1971)

=== As writer and illustrator ===
For children

- Ted and Nina Go to the Grocery Store (1935)
- Ted and Nina Have a Happy Rainy Day (1936)
- Henner's Lydia (1936) A story about a young Amish girl set in Lancaster County, Pennsylvania.
- Petite Suzanne (1937) A story filled with folkways and customs of daily life as experienced by a Gaspé Peninsula French-Canadian girl named Suzanne.
- Copper-Toed Boots (1938) A portrayal of the mid-nineteenth century rural life of the author's father in Lapeer, Michigan.
- Skippack School (1939) Subtitled "Being the Story of Eli Shrawder and of one Christopher Dock, Schoolmaster about the year 1750". A story about school-master and humanist Christopher Dock at the Mennonite School near Skippack, Pennsylvania during the 1700s.
- A Summer Day with Ted and Nina (1940)
- Thee, Hannah! (1940) A story about a young Quaker girl meeting an escaped slave in pre-Civil War Philadelphia.
- Elin's Amerika (1941) A story about the earliest Swedish settlers in the Delaware Valley in Pennsylvania.
- Up the Hill (1942) Story of a young mine worker from a Pennsylvania mining town who aspires to an art career; describes immigrant Polish customs, food, language, music, and daily life.
- Yonie Wondernose (1944) Caldecott Honor book, a story about a curious Amish boy, younger brother to Lydia of Henner's Lydia.
- Turkey for Christmas (1944) Semi-autobiographical account describing the Lofft family's first Christmas in Philadelphia after moving there in 1902.
- Bright April (1946) A story about the prejudice experienced by African-Americans in Germantown, Philadelphia, Pennsylvania, a daring topic for its time.
- Jared's Island (1947) Story of a Scottish boy named Jared Craig who in the early 1700s shipwrecks on New Jersey's Barnegat Shoals, is rescued by a Quaker, but runs away to live with Indians.
- The Door in the Wall (1950) Newbery Medal winner about a boy's courage during plague years in medieval England; central character deals with a physical handicap.
- Just Like David (1951) Jeffrey wants to be just like his older brother David; family moves from Pennsylvania to Ohio.
- Book of Nursery and Mother Goose Rhymes (1954) De Angeli's second Caldecott Honor book.
- Black Fox of Lorne (1956) Newbery Honor Book. Tenth-century Viking twins shipwreck on the Scottish coast and seek to avenge the death of their father; they encounter loyal clansmen at war, kindly shepherds, power-hungry lairds, and staunch crofters.
- A Pocket Full of Posies: A Merry Mother Goose (1961) An abbreviated form of original Mother Goose book.
- The Goose Girl (1964) Illustrated version of the Grimm story original.
- Turkey for Christmas (1965) Christmas stories.
- The Empty Barn (1966, coauthor Arthur C. de Angeli) Farm Life.
- Fiddlestrings (1974) One of deAngeli's longer books, it is based on the boyhood of her husband John Daily de Angeli in the 1890s.
- The Lion in the Box (1975) A Christmas story, a widowed mother, poverty, and an unexpected gift.
- Whistle for the Crossing (1977) Published when the author was 88, the story of the first train to travel the new railroad tracks from Philadelphia to Pittsburgh.
- Friendship and Other Poems (1981) A collection of poetry written by Marguerite de Angeli over many years and published when she was 92 years old.

=== As illustrator ===
- The New Moon: The Story of Dick Martin's Courage, His Silver Sixpence and His Friends in the New World by Cornelia Meigs (1924)
- The Prince and the Page: a Story of the Last Crusade by Charlotte M. Yonge (1925) (e-text at Project Gutenberg)
- The Dove in the Eagle's Nest by Charlotte M. Yonge (1926) (e-text at Project Gutenberg)
- The Little Duke: Richard the Fearless by Charlotte M. Yonge (1927) (e-text at Project Gutenberg)
- Milady At Arms: A Story of the Revolutionary Days by Edith Bishop Sherman (1927)
- Mario's Castle by Helen Forbes (1928)
- "The Mystery of the Brass Key" St. Nicholas for Boys and Girls by Harriette R. Campbell (April 1928) (Three illustrations)
- The Pirate's Ward by Emile Benson and Alden Arthur (1929)
- The Lances of Lynwood by Charlotte M. Yonge (1929) (e-text at Project Gutenberg)
- Meggy MacIntosh: A Highland Girl in the Carolina Colony by Elizabeth Janet Gray (1930)
- Red Coats and Blue by Harriette R Campbell (1930)
- A Candle in the Mist by Florence Crannell Means (1931)
- The Christmas Nightingale by Eric Kelly (1932)
- It's More Fun When You Know the Rules: Etiquette Problems for Girls by Beatrice Pierce (1935)
- "Bobby Ravenel's Vocation" St. Nicholas for Boys and Girls by Elsie Singmaster (February 1935) (Four illustrations)
- Challenge : Stories of Courage and Love for Girls by Helen Ferris (ed) (1936)
- Courage Stories Every Child Should Know by Helen Ferris (1936)
- The Child Life Mystery-Adventure Book by Marjorie Barrows & Frances Cavanah (illus by Marguerite de Angeli & Alexander Key) (1936)
- The Covered Bridge by Cornelia Meigs (1936)
- Joan Wanted a Kitty by Jane Brown Gemmill (1937)
- Alice-All-by-Herself by Elizabeth Coatsworth (1937)
- The Cousin from Clare by Rose Sackett (1937)
- Red Sky over Rome by Anne D. Kyle (1938)
- The Princess and the Gypsy by Jean Rosmer (1938)
- Josie and Joe by Ruth Gipson Plowhead (1938)
- Strong Hearts and Bold by Gertrude Crownfield (1938)
- Cristina Of Old New York by Gertrude Crownfield (1939)
- Heidi's Children by Johanna Spyri's translator Charles Tritten (1939)
- Hymns for Junior Worship musical editor Lawrence Curry (1940)
- Prayers and Graces for Little Children edited by Quail Hawkins (1941)
- They Loved to Laugh by Kathryn Worth (1942)
- In and Out: Verses by Tom Robinson (1943)
- Side Saddle for Dandy by Nancy Faulkner (1954)
- The Old Testament (1960 Doubleday ed) Complete collection of the art produced for this oversize volume is housed in the Free Library of Philadelphia's Children's Literature Research Collection.
- Tiny Tots Picture Book by Marguerite de Angeli & others (1962)
- Marguerite de Angeli's Book of Favorite Hymns (1963) An illustrated collection of de Angeli's favorite religious songs, many familiar to her from her early music career.
- The Empty Barn by Arthur C. de Angeli (1966)
- The Door in the Wall: A Play, by Arthur C. de Angeli (1968)
