= Memoirs (Walter Scott) =

Autobiographical work by Walter Scott

Walter Scott's "Memoirs", first published as "Memoir of the Early Life of Sir Walter Scott, Written by Himself" and also known as the Ashestiel fragment, is a short autobiographical work describing the author's ancestry, parentage, and life up to the age of 22. It is the most important source of information we have on Scott's early life. It was mainly written between 1808 and 1811, then revised and completed in 1826, and first published posthumously in 1837 as Chapter 1 of John Gibson Lockhart's multi-volume Memoirs of the Life of Sir Walter Scott. It was re-edited in 1981 by David Hewitt.

== Synopsis ==
The author begins with the hope that his memoir will be both interesting and edifying. He traces the history of his family, giving particulars of his great-grandfather, Walter Scott, a Jacobite, his grandfather Robert Scott, a Whiggish sheep-farmer, and the Haliburton family, into which Robert Scott married. He then turns to his father, Walter Scott, an able and zealous but unbusinesslike solicitor, and his father's in-laws, the Rutherford family. Next he lists those of his siblings who survived to adulthood, including Robert, a junior naval officer of poetical tastes and bullying temperament, Anne, who was remarkably accident-prone and died young, Thomas, an unsuccessful farmer turned army officer, and Daniel, a ne'er-do-well. The author now reaches his own birth in Edinburgh on 15 August 1771 ("I believe") and his infancy, in the course of which he fell ill and lost the use of one leg and also survived an attempt on his life by a deranged servant. Sent to recover with his maternal grandparents on their farm he heard tales of the Jacobite rebellions and traditional songs and ballads which formed his future taste and pursuits. He describes the parish clergyman, Dr. Duncan, a historian of the 1745 rebellion. When he was aged 3 his family sent Scott to Bath for a year under the care of an aunt, hoping, in vain, that this would accelerate his recovery. Aged about 6 he stayed for the sake of the sea air at Prestonpans, where he first met George Constable, later to be the model of his character Jonathan Oldbuck. Scott returned to family life in his father's house in George's Square, Edinburgh, and in 1779 he was enrolled in the High School. Though a popular boy his record as a scholar there was not at first distinguished, but it later improved under the teaching of the school's rector, Dr. Adams, from whom he derived a love of Latin literature. His growing love of English literature owed much to his own researches and the encouragement of Thomas Blacklock, who introduced him to the poems of Ossian and Spenser. He thus left the High School with much ill-organized knowledge and a love of books. The author then mentions his discovery of Percy's Reliques, which he adored, and his growing appreciation of natural beauty. As a student at the University of Edinburgh Scott entirely failed to learn Greek and made a poor showing at mathematics, but did better at ethics and moral philosophy, and also studied history and law. He was indentured to his father as an apprentice solicitor and drudged at the study of law, while also reading widely in chivalric romances and histories, especially during an illness which prostrated him, and studying French and Italian to enable himself to read yet more. Returned to health, he delighted in riding and walking through the countryside around Edinburgh in search of sites of scenic and historic interest. He also tried, but failed, to acquire any proficiency in painting and singing. He joined a number of literary societies, and used them to develop his skills in debating and composition and to improve his general education. His father offered to take him into partnership, but instead Scott began studying to be an advocate alongside his friend William Clerk. They qualified in Civil law in 1791, in Scots law in 1792, and "on 11 July 1792 we both assumed the gown with all its duties and honours". Scott had reached the status of a gentleman with a place in Edinburgh society.

== Composition ==
The manuscript of the "Memoirs", comprising three fascicles, was written intermittently between 1808 and 1826, a period that saw several other literary memoirs: Coleridge's Biographia Literaria, De Quincey's Confessions of an English Opium-Eater, Byron's never-published Memoirs, and the semi-autobiographical essays of Charles Lamb. Scott began composing it, as the manuscript itself records, on 26 April 1808 at Ashestiel, his home near Selkirk, and continued until he had filled the first fascicle, ending with the account of his stay in Bath. He returned to the project in late 1810 or early 1811 and seems to have completed the second and third fascicles without any further breaks. He then abandoned his memoirs until 1826 when he wrote a number of new passages, some of which were intended to be interpolated into the text and some to appear as footnotes. Despite this revision the text was still not in a finished state. Among other faults it contained inconsistencies arising from the fact that it had been written over such a long stretch of time, but Scott gave the work no final polishing to remove them. The manuscript shows that it was written fluently, with the lack of punctuation typical of Scott's final drafts. Scott's "Memoirs" have often been considered a fragment, though the literary scholar David Hewitt has argued that it is a complete work, only ever intended to show how the author came to man's estate.

== Publication history ==
The "Memoirs" were never published in Scott's lifetime, but after his death Scott's son-in-law J. G. Lockhart, according to his own claim, discovered the manuscript in an old cabinet at Abbotsford while writing the first volume of his Life of Sir Walter Scott, Bart., and decided to publish the "Memoirs" as the first chapter of his own work, "illustrating" them with his own researches into Scott's early life in the next five chapters. He edited the "Memoirs" more faithfully than was always his practice, though he did print many of the 1826 passages as footnotes even when Scott had certainly intended that they appear in the main text. He also added punctuation and dates.

The Ashestiel fragment was displayed at the Scott Centenary Exhibition in 1871, but thereafter was unavailable to scholars for almost a hundred years until, in 1970, it was acquired by the National Library of Scotland. It is now designated NLS MS Acc 4991. It was edited from the original manuscript, for the first time since Lockhart's 1837 volume, by David Hewitt in 1981. This edition presents Scott's memoir more accurately than Lockhart did, differentiating the 1808–1811 text more clearly from the 1826 revisions.

== Criticism ==
Reviews of the first volume of Lockhart's biography had much to say in praise of the Ashestiel fragment. The Literary Gazette thought it "decidedly the most interesting portion of the work", The Monthly Review called it "the most engaging and diversified [memoir] that we have ever perused regarding the early life of any man", and Tait's Edinburgh Magazine said that it "bears many characteristics of Scott's mingled sagacity, modesty, and amiability". Yet the last reviewer also thought it "meagre...and unsatisfactory", while The Dublin Review, which found it to possess "very considerable interest", also thought it had "an appearance of premeditation and carefulness, that rather take away from the pleasure its perusal would otherwise give". Lord Cockburn, a former Solicitor General for Scotland, noted in his diary that the "Memoirs" were admirable; "no man ever traced the sources of his own mental peculiarities more satisfactorily". Later in the 19th century Scott's editor Andrew Lang regretted that Scott had not in 1826 extended the fragment to form a complete autobiography, since it would have been "more valuable, in all senses, than his later novels". The modern critic David Hewitt has written of Scott's "Memoirs" that

His self-description is intelligent, discriminating and well-proportioned. His manner is relaxed...He varies the pace and tone of the narrative with anecdotes. He does not take himself too seriously and there is much amused self-observation. [It is] unquestionably a delightful work, and much the best description of his youth.

He nevertheless finds "a lack of intimacy and no self-revelation". He sees it as an exercise in teleological self-construction, examining his past life, and especially his early reading, for an explanation of his present success as a poet and ballad-collector. In this respect he compares it unfavourably with Wordsworth's The Prelude, which, unlike the "Memoirs", "both describes his past experiences...and analyses their influence upon his mind as he creates". The interplay between the two time schemes of The Prelude, that covering the action and that covering the process of writing, "uncovers the fresh and immediate experience of the process of creation".

== Modern edition ==
- Hewitt, David, ed. (1981). Scott on Himself: A Selection of the Autobiographical Writings of Sir Walter Scott. Edinburgh: Scottish Academic Press. pp. 1–44, 262–268. ISBN 0707302838.
