= The Door in the Wall (novel) =

1949 book by Marguerite De Angeli

- First edition
- Author: Marguerite de Angeli
- Language: English
- Genre: Children's literature Historical fiction
- Publisher: Doubleday
- Publication date: 1949
- Publication place: United States
- Media type: Hardback, Paperback & Ebook
- Pages: 128 pages (first edition, and hardback)
- ISBN: 0440402832

The Door in the Wall is a 1949 novel by Marguerite de Angeli that received the Newbery Medal for excellence in American children's literature in 1950.

== Plot summary ==
The story, illustrated by the author, is set in England during the Middle Ages, as the Black Death (bubonic plague) is sweeping across the country. Ten-year-old Robin is to be sent away to become a knight like his father, but his dreams are endangered when he loses the use of his legs. A doctor reassures Robin that the weakness in his legs is not caused by the plague. His parents are away, his father joins the king and his mother goes to work for the queen, and the servants abandon the house, fearing the plague. Robin is saved by Brother Luke, a friar, who finds him and takes him to St. Mark's, the monastery where Brother Luke lives, and cares for him.

Brother Luke teaches Robin how to read using the Bible, how to swim as exercise, whittling and wood carving and how to use crutches he assists in crafting, to be independent and build strength and self-confidence, but Robin also learns patience and strength from the friar. The friar tells him that before overcoming a challenge you must first find "the door in the wall".

Robin's parents had planned for him to stay with Sir Peter de Lindsay to be a page, the first step in becoming a knight. John Go-in-the-Wynd, a minstrel, gives him a letter from Robin's father telling him and John Go-in-the-Wynd and Brother Luke to go to Lindsay. They get there after traveling for long hours for several days, almost being robbed, and going on the wrong road for a time. Arriving safely, he is welcomed warmly by de Lindsay and his family. During his stay, he fulfills his page duties as far as he is capable, continues his literary lessons, and swimming in the autumn-chilled river. Inspired by Go-in-the-Wynd's playing, he also learns to play the harp, and utilizes his growing woodworking skills to start crafting his own.

Some time later, Lindsay Castle is besieged by the Welsh. Due to a lean harvest that year, food and water begin to run low. With Brother Luke's support and blessing, Robin hatches a secret plan to save the castle without de Lindsay's knowledge. Robin swims the chilly river, hobbles through enemy lines with his crutches, disguised as a simple-minded young shepherd, and alerts Go-in-the-Wynd, who at the time was staying with his elderly mother. John sends word to de Lindsay's cousin Sir Hugh, whose forces have the element of surprise and a blanket of fog to defeat the Welsh invaders.

Later that winter, the King and Queen with their forces and Robin's parents arrive just in time for Christmas Eve. Robin is reunited with his parents, and after he accompanies himself in a Christmas carol with his completed harp for the royal couple, he is rewarded for his service to the crown in saving Lindsay Castle. His parents assure him that they love him more for his brave spirit than for his physical prowess.

== Reviews ==
- "An enthralling and inspiring tale of triumph over handicap. Unusually beautiful illustrations, full of authentic detail, combine with the text to make life in England during the Middle Ages come alive." - The New York Times
- "One has the feeling of the authenticity of the pageantry and atmosphere if medieval England... the illustrations are beautifully handled." - Kirkus Reviews
- "A poignant story, full of action, and a strongly painted canvas of the times as well." - The New Yorker

Awards
Preceded by King of the Wind	Newbery Medal recipient 1950	Succeeded by Amos Fortune, Free Man
