= Thud Ridge (book) =

- Author: Jack Broughton
- Language: English
- Subject: Vietnam air war
- Genre: War memoir
- Publisher: J. B. Lippincott Company; Crécy Publishing (paperback)
- Publication date: January 1, 1969; 2006 (paperback)
- Media type: Hardcover; Paperback
- Pages: 230
- ISBN: 978-0-85979-116-8
- OCLC: 67872357
- Followed by: Going Downtown: the War Against Hanoi and Washington

Thud Ridge is a 1969 memoir by Jack Broughton about flying the F-105 "Thud" for the United States Air Force in the Vietnam War during Operation Rolling Thunder. The title Thud Ridge derives from the nickname given by F-105 pilots to the Tam Dao range, which was both a waypoint during air attacks in the vicinity of Hanoi, North Vietnam, and a terrain masking feature for ingressing fighters.

The book set a style that was followed over the next several decades by a spate of gritty memoirs by air veterans of the Vietnam War. Broughton's book is unique to the extent that it was described as "history in the making" by Hanson W. Baldwin of the New York Times.

== Inspiration and publication ==
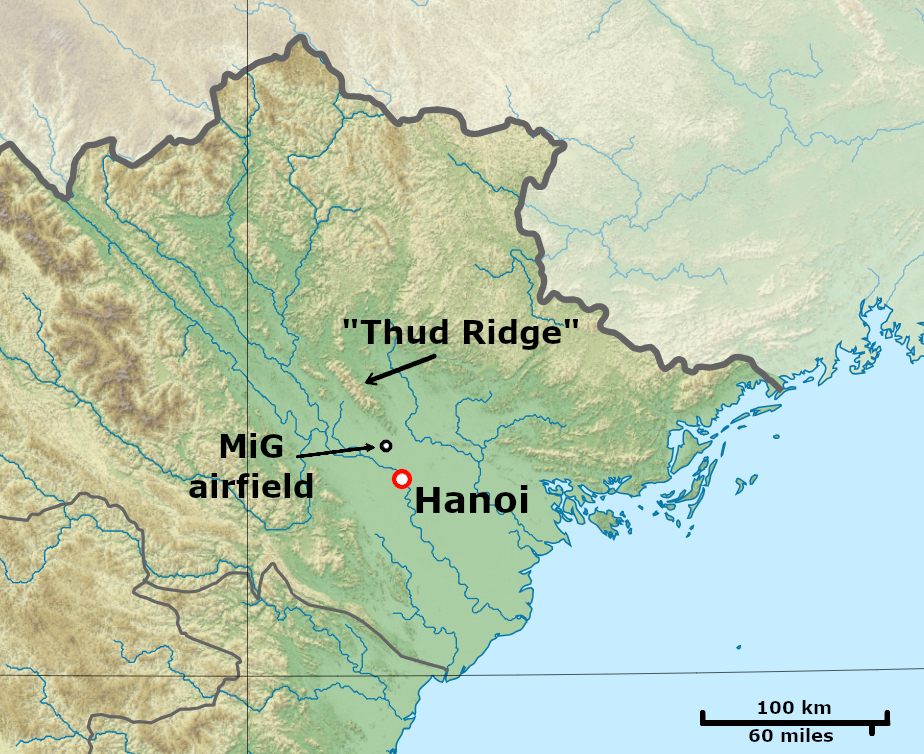
Location of Thud Ridge

The book is based on Broughton's tour of duty between September 1966 and June 1967 as vice commander of the 355th Tactical Fighter Wing, based at Takhli Royal Thai Air Force Base, Thailand. The narrative is anecdotal in nature, a commentary of his observations of persons, aircraft, and events during his tour, more or less chronologically, but without dated references. Few individuals are identified by other than first or nicknames, but Broughton develops most as characters through descriptions of their career backgrounds. Broughton's accounts of missions "up north" were enhanced in both accuracy and verisimilitude by verbatim transcriptions of radio transmissions he recorded using a small tape recorder mounted in the cockpit of his aircraft.

In Thud Ridge Broughton is highly critical of the U.S. command structure directing air operations against North Vietnam. He blames micromanagement by the highest levels in Washington down to the Thirteenth Air Force, a command echelon based in the Philippines, for losses of men and aircraft that he characterizes as "astronomical" and "worthless." He is particularly critical, however, of the "bomber mentality" management by generals who came up through the Strategic Air Command and then occupied key command slots in the war, which was being fought by pilots of the Tactical Air Command.

The book came about when, at the completion of his tour of duty, Broughton and two of his pilots were court martialed by the USAF for allegedly conspiring to violate the rules of engagement regarding U.S. air operations. Although acquitted of the most serious charges, Broughton, who had been personally relieved of duty by Pacific Air Forces commander Gen. John D. Ryan, was subsequently transferred to an obscure post in the Pentagon, allegedly as a vendetta because his punishment was so slight. Required by office protocol to work only two or three days a month, he used both his extra time and his bitterness at the Air Force to compose Thud Ridge while he awaited approval of an application to appeal of his conviction to the Air Force Board for Correction of Military Records.

After his conviction was overturned and expunged from his record because of "undue command influence," Broughton retired from the Air Force in August 1968 and had the memoir published by J. B. Lippincott. The book appeared soon after as a Bantam paperback, with reprint editions in 1985, 2002, and 2006.

== Legacy ==
Broughton's book brought him into immediate disfavor with the Air Force hierarchy. However, thirty years after the incident resulting in the court martial, U.S. Air Force Chief of Staff General Ronald R. Fogleman added Thud Ridge to the CSAF Professional Reading Program he instituted in 1996 and directed the Air Force to purchase 10,000 copies. Along with 12 other books on the reading list, Thud Ridge was provided at no expense to all Air Force officers upon their promotion to captain.
