= Jacksel M. Broughton =

US Air Force fighter pilot (1925–2014)

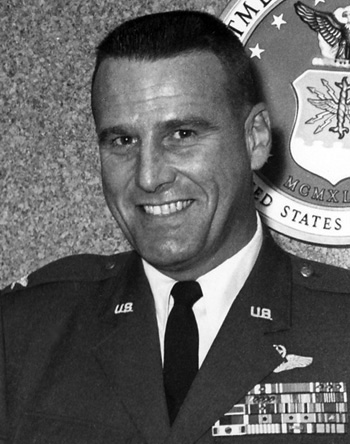
- Born: January 4, 1925; Utica, New York, U.S.
- Died: October 24, 2014 (aged 89); Lake Forest, California, U.S.
- Burial place: Miramar National Cemetery
- Military career
- Allegiance: United States of America
- Branch: United States Air Force
- Service years: 1942–1968
- Rank: Colonel
- Nickname: Jack
- Commands: USAF Air Demonstration Squadron; 5th Fighter-Interceptor Squadron
- Conflicts: World War II; Korean War; Vietnam War
- Awards: Air Force Cross; Silver Star (2); Legion of Merit; Distinguished Flying Cross (4); Air Medal (10)

Jacksel Markham "Jack" Broughton (January 4, 1925 – October 24, 2014) was a career officer and fighter pilot in the United States Air Force (USAF). He retired in the rank of colonel on August 31, 1968, with 43 separate awards and decorations, including four Distinguished Flying Crosses, two Silver Stars and the highest Air Force service decoration for heroism, the presidentially-awarded Air Force Cross. Broughton avowed that his proudest accomplishment was being combat-qualified in every air force fighter from the P-47 Thunderbolt to the F-106 Delta Dart. He authored two personal memoirs of the Vietnam War that were highly critical of the direction of the air war there and the rules of engagement.

== Biography ==
Broughton was born January 4, 1925, in Utica, New York. He was a 1942 graduate of Brighton High School in Rochester, New York. He was an Episcopalian. Broughton entered the United States Military Academy on July 15, 1942, appointed from New York's 38th congressional district, in the wartime three-year curriculum that consolidated the cadet second (junior) and first class (senior) years into a single 12-month period. He graduated 839th in general merit among the 852 members of the Class of 1945, completing his flight training while still a cadet at Garner Field, Texas, and Stewart Field, New York. He was commissioned into the United States Army Air Forces on June 5, 1945. Broughton married on December 25, 1951, to Alice Joy ("AJ") Owen, and produced a son and three daughters. (Note: Markham (Mark, 1952), Sheila (1960), Maureen (1961), and Kathleen (1965).)

Following his retirement from the USAF in 1968, Broughton worked as a pilot for Antilles Air Boats in Fajardo, Puerto Rico, for Conroy Aircraft managing a contract for aerial resupply of Mobil Oil operations on the Alaska North Slope, and as a manager in the flight test program and a technical planning advisor for the Space Shuttle Endeavour for Rockwell International. He also formed a corporation seeking to develop a practical bus-sized air cushion vehicle.

He died in Lake Forest, California on October 24, 2014, at the age of 89.

== Air Force career ==
World War II ended before Broughton could participate in combat missions. He initially combat-qualified as a pilot in North American B-25 Mitchell medium bombers at Enid Army Air Field, Oklahoma, and was in training to become a Boeing B-17 Flying Fortress pilot at Hendricks Army Air Field, Florida, when he received orders in December 1945 transferring him to Europe as a fighter pilot.

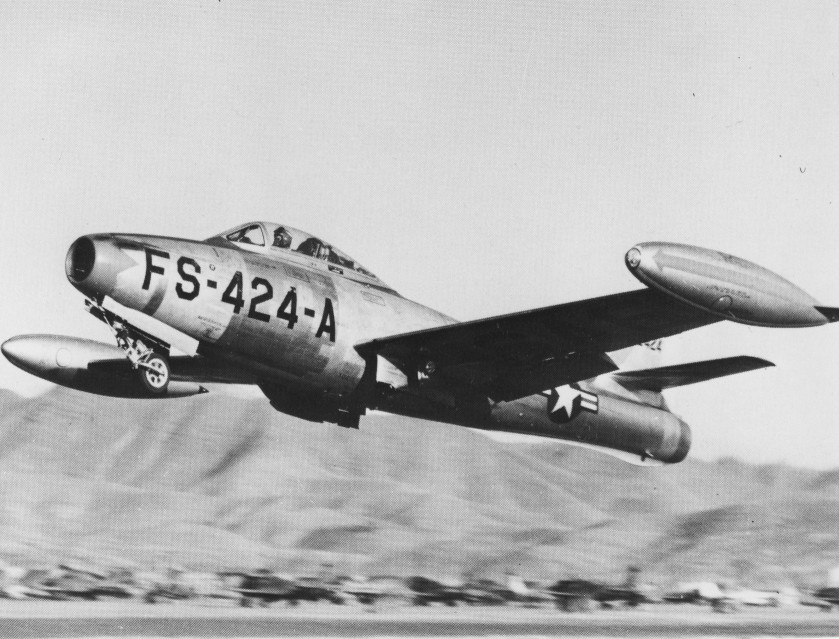
F-84 Thunderjet

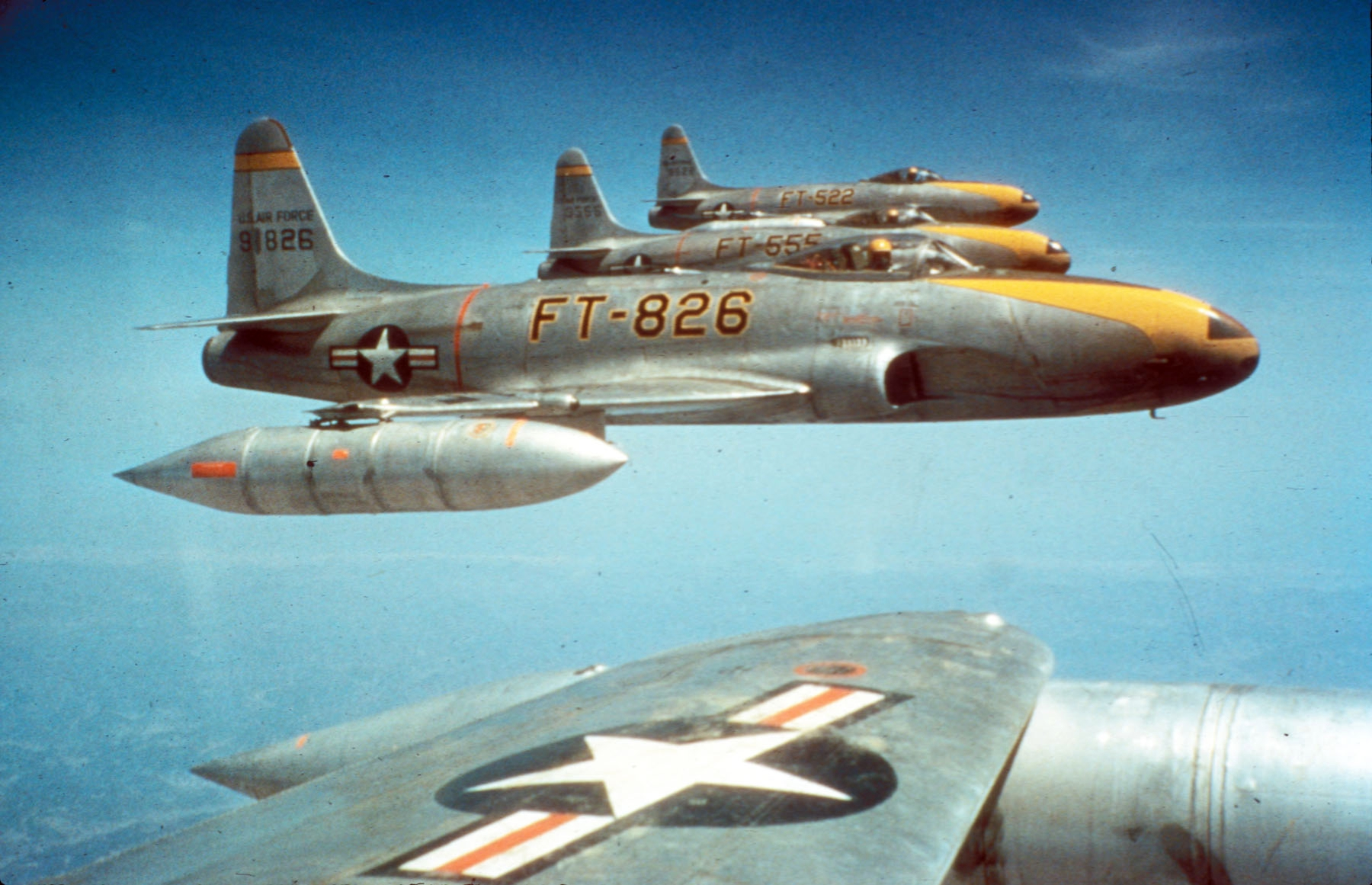
8th FBS F-80Cs over Korea, 1950

His first operational assignment in March 1946 was as a Republic P-47 Thunderbolt pilot in the 389th Fighter Squadron, 366th Fighter Group, at Fritzlar Air Base, Germany, followed by a transfer in June 1947 to the 525th Fighter Squadron, 86th Fighter Group at Neubiberg Air Base, where he was stationed in September 1947 when the United States Air Force became a separate service. He returned to the U.S. in 1948, and after two brief instructor assignments he described as "unattractive", joined the newly created Fighter Weapons Squadron at Las Vegas Air Force Base, Nevada.

Between January and November 1951 Broughton flew two combat tours of duty in the Korean War, in F-80C Shooting Stars with the 8th Fighter-Bomber Squadron, 49th Fighter-Bomber Group, at Taegu Air Base, and as flight leader for Project Swatrock, a combat field test of the Swiss-manufactured Oerlikon anti-tank rocket using the Republic F-84 Thunderjet as a test bed. (Note: The USAF did not adopt the rocket, but Broughton alleged that one of the USAF generals reviewing the program went to work for Oerlikon after retirement and oversaw the sale of the weapon to the Soviet Union. (Going Downtown, p. 34; Rupert Red Two, p. 173).) After Korea, Broughton became Crew Training Air Force (CREWTAF) operations officer at Del Rio Air Force Base, Texas, directing training in F-84s. He transferred in 1953 to Luke Air Force Base, Arizona, to command one of the first F-84F Thunderstreak squadrons, a firepower demonstration team, leading the team to win the 1954 Bendix Trophy Race.

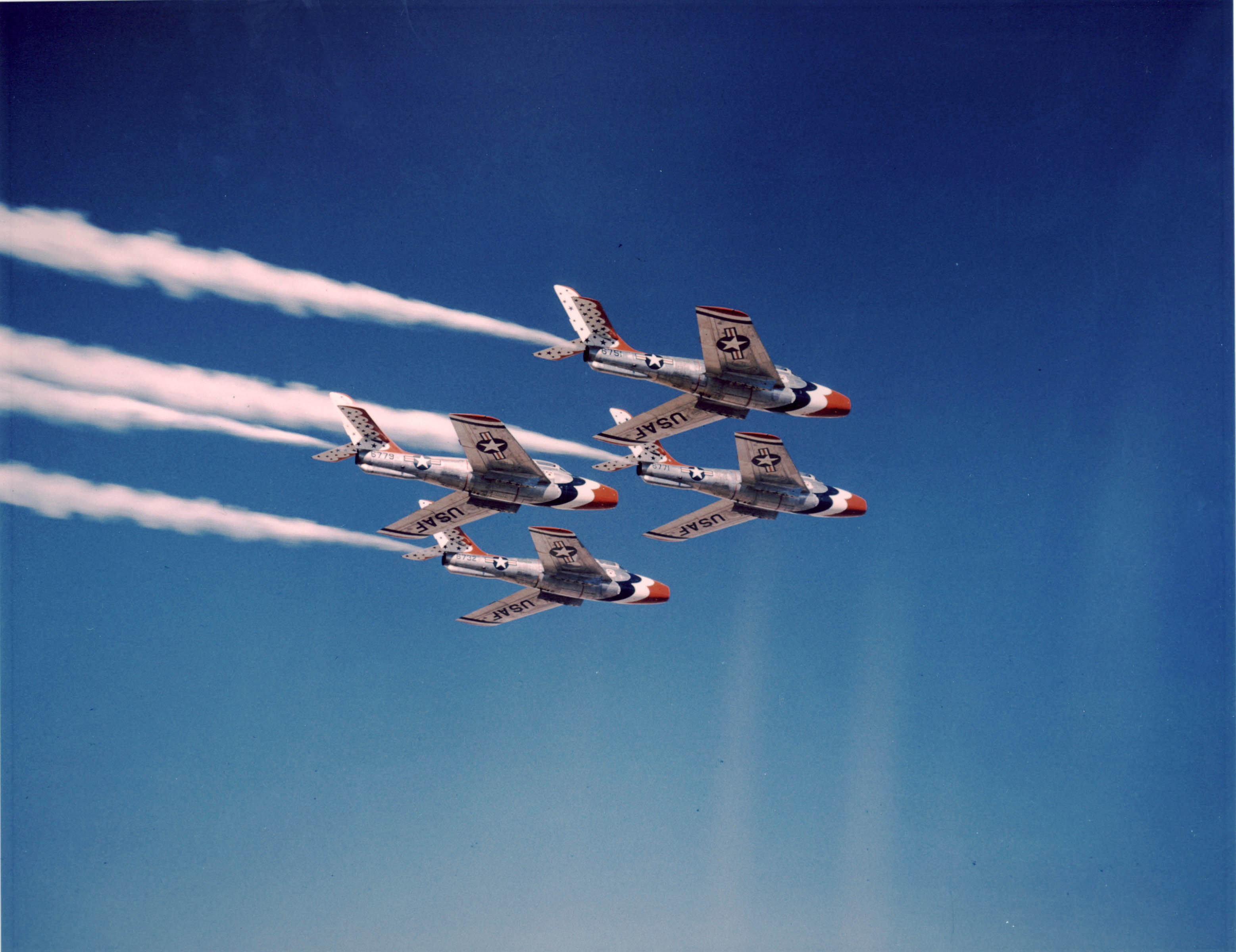
Broughton leading the Thunderbirds in F-84F Thunderstreaks.

From October 1954 to February 1957 Broughton commanded the Thunderbirds, the USAF aerial demonstration team, leading them through the transition from the straight-wing F-84G to the swept-wing F-84F, and then to become the world's first supersonic acrobatic team in the F-100C Super Sabre. After assignments at Vincent Air Force Base, Arizona, and Tyndall Air Force Base, Florida, commanding a fighter weapons systems training squadron, Broughton spent a year in Ankara, Turkey, as a member of the U.S. Military Assistance Group there. His tour was cut short by a medical emergency involving his son, and he transferred in 1961 to the staff of the 78th Air Defense Wing at Hamilton Air Force Base, California.

From September 1962 to June 1964, when he was promoted to colonel, Broughton commanded the 5th Fighter-Interceptor Squadron, an Air Defense Command squadron of Convair F-106 Delta Darts at Minot Air Force Base, North Dakota, and was instrumental in getting the aircraft's deadly ejection seat replaced. He graduated from two professional military education schools, the Air Command and Staff College in 1958, and the National War College in 1965. He was then assigned as deputy commander for operations (DCS/Ops) of the 6441st Tactical Fighter Wing at Yokota Air Base, Japan. The 6441st TFW had been activated in 1964 to control both the nuclear strike mission and rotational combat duties in Thailand of three squadrons of Republic F-105 Thunderchiefs.

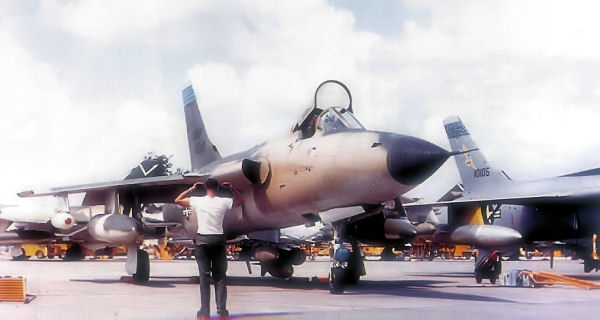
F-105s at Takhli RTAFB in 1966

His final assignment was as vice commander of the 355th Tactical Fighter Wing at Takhli Royal Thai Air Force Base between September 1966 and June 1967, leading 102 missions against targets in North Vietnam in the F-105.

== Author ==
Broughton authored two books, Thud Ridge (1968) and Going Downtown: The War Against Hanoi and Washington (1988), in which he discussed his perceptions and history of the air war over Southeast Asia. The latter book was based largely upon his subsequent court martial resulting from an attack on a Soviet ship in Haiphong Harbor (the "Turkestan incident"). In 2007 he published Rupert Red Two: A Fighter Pilot's Life from Thunderbolts to Thunderchiefs, an autobiography of his USAF career. (Note: "Rupert Red Two" was Broughton's call sign when he flew wing for group commander Colonel Clarence T. "Curly" Edwinson.)

Thud Ridge was a contemporary wartime memoir of his tour in Southeast Asia. Broughton was highly critical of the U.S. command structure then directing air operations against North Vietnam. The book resulted from the court-martial of Broughton and two of his pilots for allegedly conspiring to violate the rules of engagement regarding U.S. air operations. Although acquitted of the most serious charges at his court martial, presided over by then-Colonel Chuck Yeager, Broughton was subsequently transferred to an obscure post in The Pentagon, (Note: Project "leader" of a one-man vertical takeoff and landing study, Weapons Systems Evaluation Group (WSEG), DARPA.) allegedly as a vendetta because his punishment was so slight.

Required by office protocol to work only two or three days a month, he used both his extra time and his bitterness at the Air Force senior bureaucracy and civilian political appointees in the Department of Defense and Department of the Air Force to compose Thud Ridge while he awaited approval of an application to appeal of his conviction to the Air Force Board for Correction of Military Records. After his conviction was overturned and expunged from his record because of "undue command influence", Broughton retired from the Air Force in August 1968 and had the memoir published by J.B. Lippincott.

Broughton continued to be active as a writer, having his first article "Pain and Gain in the Century Series" published by Air Force Magazine in September 2012.

== Awards and decorations ==

US Air Force Command Pilot Badge
Air Force Cross
| Silver Star w/ 1 bronze oak leaf cluster | Legion of Merit | Distinguished Flying Cross w/ Valor device and 3 bronze oak leaf clusters |
| Air Medal w/ 1 silver and 3 bronze oak leaf clusters | Air Medal (second ribbon required for accoutrement spacing) | Air Force Commendation Medal |
| Army Commendation Medal | Air Force Presidential Unit Citation | Air Force Outstanding Unit Award w/ 1 bronze oak leaf cluster |
| American Campaign Medal | World War II Victory Medal | Army of Occupation Medal 'Germany' clasp |
| National Defense Service Medal w/ 1 bronze service star | Korean Service Medal w/ 3 bronze campaign stars | Vietnam Service Medal w/ 2 bronze campaign stars |
| Air Force Longevity Service Award w/ 1 silver oak leaf cluster | Republic of Korea Presidential Unit Citation | Republic of Vietnam Gallantry Cross |
| United Nations Service Medal for Korea | Vietnam Campaign Medal | Korean War Service Medal |

=== Air Force Cross citation ===

Service: Air Force

Rank: Colonel

Department of the Air Force, Special Order GB-188 (June 1, 1967)

The President of the United States of America, authorized by Title 10, Section 8742, United States Code, takes pleasure in presenting the Air Force Cross to Colonel Jacksel M. Broughton (AFSN: 0-17035), United States Air Force, for extraordinary heroism in connection with military operations against an opposing armed force in Southeast Asia while serving as Pilot of an F-105 Thunderchief of the 355th Tactical Fighter Wing, Takhli Royal Thai Air Base, in action over North Vietnam on 5 February 1967. On that date, Colonel Broughton was Mission Commander of a flight of a two wing F-105 Thunderchief strike force which attacked a heavily defended target in North Vietnam. Despite serious aircraft malfunctions, marginal weather, and grave damage to his aircraft from an exploding surface-to-air missile, he placed his armament directly on target, scattering fire and debris which illuminated the target for easy acquisition by the following strike force. Disregarding the crippled condition of his aircraft, which minimized his chances for recovery to friendly territory, Colonel Broughton then willfully acted as a decoy to divert hostile aircraft approaching the strike force. Through his extraordinary heroism, superb airmanship, and aggressiveness in the face of the enemy, Colonel Broughton reflected the highest credit upon himself and the United States Air Force.

=== Silver Star citations ===
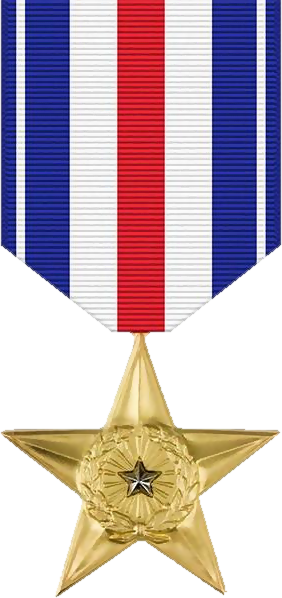

Silver Star for Actions of 4 December 1966

The President of the United States of America, authorized by Act of Congress July 9, 1918 (amended by an act of July 25, 1963), takes pleasure in presenting the Silver Star to Colonel Jacksel M. Broughton (AFSN: 0-17035), United States Air Force, for gallantry in connection with military operations against an opposing armed force while serving as Pilot of an F-105 Thunderchief of the 355th Tactical Fighter Wing, Takhli Royal Thai Air Base, in action in Southeast Asia, on 4 December 1966. On that date, Colonel Broughton was element leader in the lead flight and Deputy Mission Commander of the strike force executed against a petroleum products storage area that is the principle [sic] source of supply for the airfield from which a large force of hostile interceptor operate. Despite extremely marginal weather conditions en route and in the target area, the threat of surface-to-air missiles and hostile interceptors and intense and accurate anti-aircraft artillery fire, Colonel Broughton completed an attack that destroyed a significant portion of the target defenses and greatly contributed to the success of the mission. By his gallantry and devotion to duty, Colonel Broughton has reflected great credit upon himself and the United States Air Force.

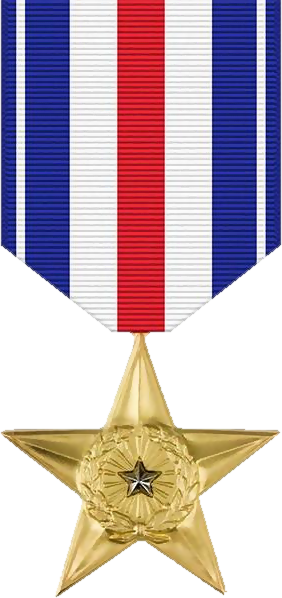

Silver Star for Actions of 13 May 1967

The President of the United States of America, authorized by Act of Congress July 9, 1918 (amended by an act of July 25, 1963), takes pleasure in presenting a Bronze Oak Leaf Cluster in lieu of a Second Award of the Silver Star to Colonel Jacksel M. Broughton (AFSN: 0-17035), United States Air Force, for gallantry in connection with military operations against an opposing armed force while serving as Pilot of an F-105 Thunderchief of the 355th Tactical Fighter Wing, Takhli Royal Thai Air Base, in action in Southeast Asia, on 13 May 1967. On that date, Colonel Broughton was the Force Commander of a mission assigned to destroy a key rail junction and classification yard. Colonel Broughton led the forces precisely to the target in spite of adverse weather conditions, heavy flak barrages and surface-to-air missile attack. He completely silenced several anti-aircraft artillery sites in the immediate proximity of the target thereby greatly enabling the remainder of the forces to strike the target very effectively. As he led his flight from the target area, he observed a flight of MiG interceptors attacking another strike force in the area and with complete disregard for his personal welfare engaged the hostile aircraft. Even though he was below bingo fuel, Colonel Broughton continued his attack until his flight had damaged two of the interceptors and driven them from the other forces. By his gallantry and devotion to duty, Colonel Broughton has reflected great credit upon himself and the United States Air Force.

== Notes ==
Footnotes

Citations
