= Republic F-105 Thunderchief =

US Air Force supersonic fighter-bomber

F-105 Thunderchief
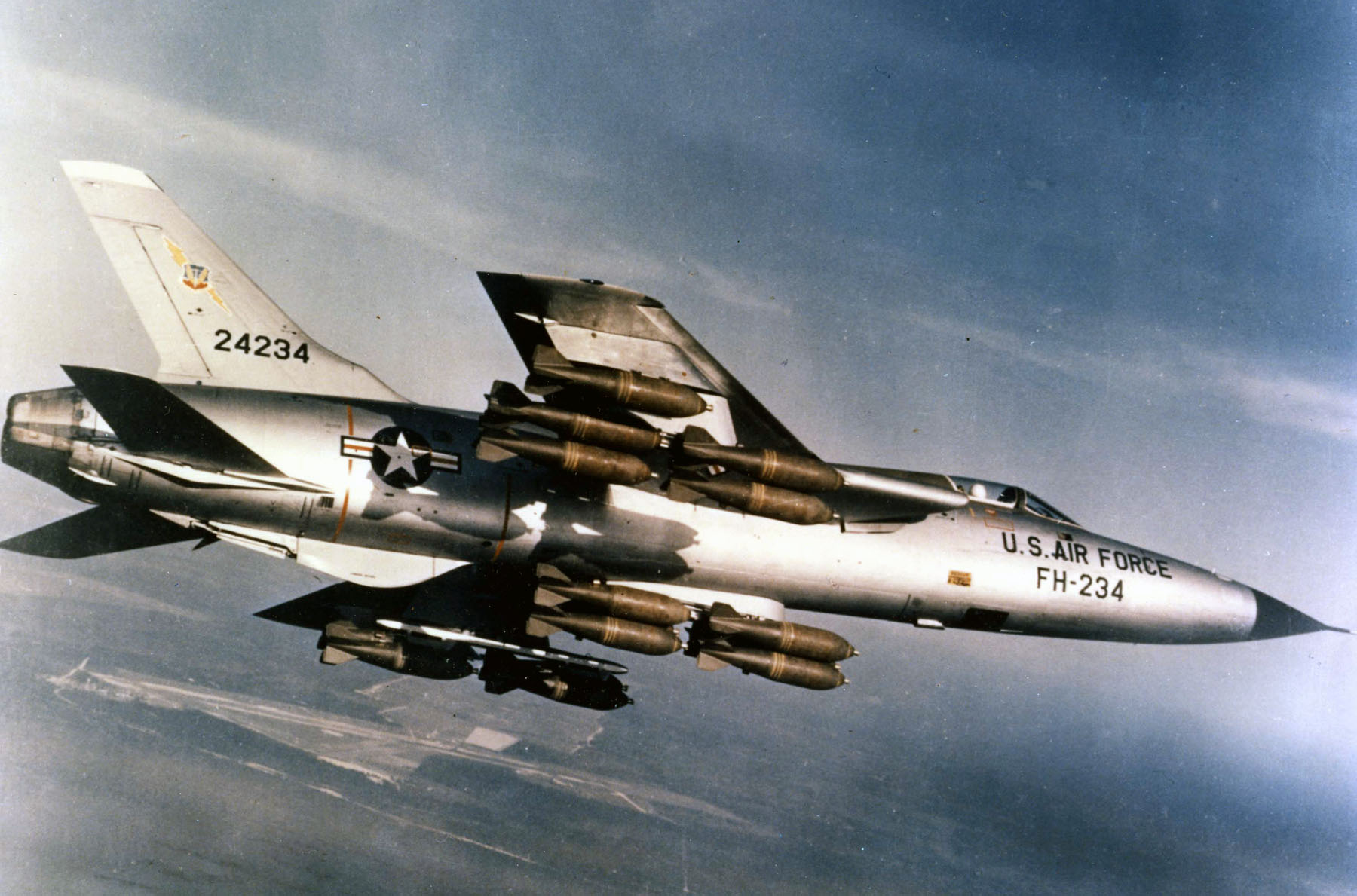
- An F-105D Thunderchief flying with a full load of sixteen 750 lb (340 kg) bombs on its five hardpoints

General information
- Type: Fighter-bomber
- National origin: United States
- Manufacturer: Republic Aviation
- Primary user: United States Air Force
- Number built: 833

History
- Manufactured: 1955–1964
- Introduction date: 27 May 1958
- First flight: 22 October 1955
- Retired: 25 February 1984

The Republic F-105 Thunderchief is an American fighter-bomber that served with the United States Air Force from 1958 to 1984. Capable of Mach 2, it conducted the majority of strike bombing missions during the early years of the Vietnam War. It was originally designed as a single-seat, nuclear-attack aircraft; a two-seat Wild Weasel version was later developed for the specialized suppression of enemy air defenses (SEAD) role against surface-to-air missile sites. The F-105 was commonly known as the "Thud" by its crews. It is the only American aircraft to have been removed from combat due to high loss rates.

As a follow-on to the Mach 1 capable North American F-100 Super Sabre, the F-105 was also armed with missiles and a rotary cannon; however, its design was tailored to high-speed low-altitude penetration carrying a single nuclear weapon internally. First flown in 1955, the Thunderchief entered service in 1958. The single-engine F-105 could deliver a bomb load greater than some American heavy bombers of World War II such as the Boeing B-17 Flying Fortress and Consolidated B-24 Liberator. The F-105 was one of the primary attack aircraft of the Vietnam War, with over 20,000 Thunderchief sorties flown. Out of the 833 produced, 382 aircraft were lost, including 62 operational (non-combat) losses. Although less agile than smaller MiG fighters, USAF F-105s were credited with 27.5 kills.

During the conflict, the single-seat F-105D was the primary aircraft delivering heavy bomb loads against the various military targets. Meanwhile, the two-seat F-105F and F-105G Wild Weasel variants became the first dedicated SEAD platforms, fighting against the Soviet-built S-75 Dvina (NATO reporting name: SA-2 Guideline) surface-to-air missiles. Two Wild Weasel pilots were awarded the Medal of Honor for attacking North Vietnamese surface-to-air missile sites, with one shooting down two MiG-17s the same day. The dangerous missions often required them to be the "first in, last out", suppressing enemy air defenses while strike aircraft accomplished their missions and then left the area.

When the Thunderchief entered service it was the largest single-seat, single-engine combat aircraft in history, weighing approximately 50,000 pounds (23,000 kg). It could exceed the speed of sound at sea level and reach Mach 2 at high altitude. The F-105 could carry up to 14,000 lb (6,400 kg) of bombs and missiles. The Thunderchief was later replaced as a strike aircraft over North Vietnam by both the McDonnell Douglas F-4 Phantom II and the swing-wing General Dynamics F-111 Aardvark. However, the "Wild Weasel" variants of the F-105 remained in service until early 1984, at which point they were replaced by the specialized F-4G "Wild Weasel V".

== Development ==
=== Design phase ===
Republic Aviation started work on what would become the Thunderchief during 1951. It was conceived of as an internal project to produce a replacement for the RF-84F Thunderflash, which first used the characteristic wing-root air intakes to make room for cameras in the nose section. The design team led by Alexander Kartveli examined some 108 configurations before settling on a large, single-engine AP-63FBX (Advanced Project 63 Fighter Bomber, Experimental), specifically AP-63-31. The new aircraft was intended primarily for supersonic, low altitude penetration to deliver a single, internally carried nuclear bomb. The emphasis was placed on low-altitude speed and flight characteristics, range, and payload. The aircraft would be fitted with a large engine, and a relatively small wing with a high wing loading for a stable ride at low altitudes, and less drag at supersonic speeds. Traditional fighter attributes such as maneuverability were a secondary consideration.

During April 1952, Republic made its contractor proposal, which contained many of the features that the United States Air Force (USAF) would have liked the RF-84F to have been outfitted with had it been technically possible; one month later, the Air Staff endorsed its development over that of further developing the RF-84F. The USAF promptly issued Republic with an initial contract covering preproduction engineering, tooling, as well as the production of 199 aircraft, the first of which was to be operationally ready by 1955. However, by March 1953, the USAF had reduced the order to 37 fighter-bombers and nine tactical reconnaissance aircraft, citing the approaching end of the Korean War. In October 1953, the F-105 mock-up was inspected; no major changes were recommended. By this point, the aircraft had grown so large that the Allison J71 turbojet intended for it was abandoned in favor of the more powerful Pratt & Whitney J75. Anticipating a protracted development of the engine, it was expected that the first aircraft would use the smaller Pratt & Whitney J57. Near the end of 1953, the entire program was suspended by the USAF due to a number of delays and uncertainties regarding the aircraft. However, on 28 June 1954, the USAF officially ordered 15 F-105s (two YF-105As, four YF-105Bs, six F-105Bs, and three RF-105Bs) under the Weapon System designation WS-306A.

=== Initial flights ===
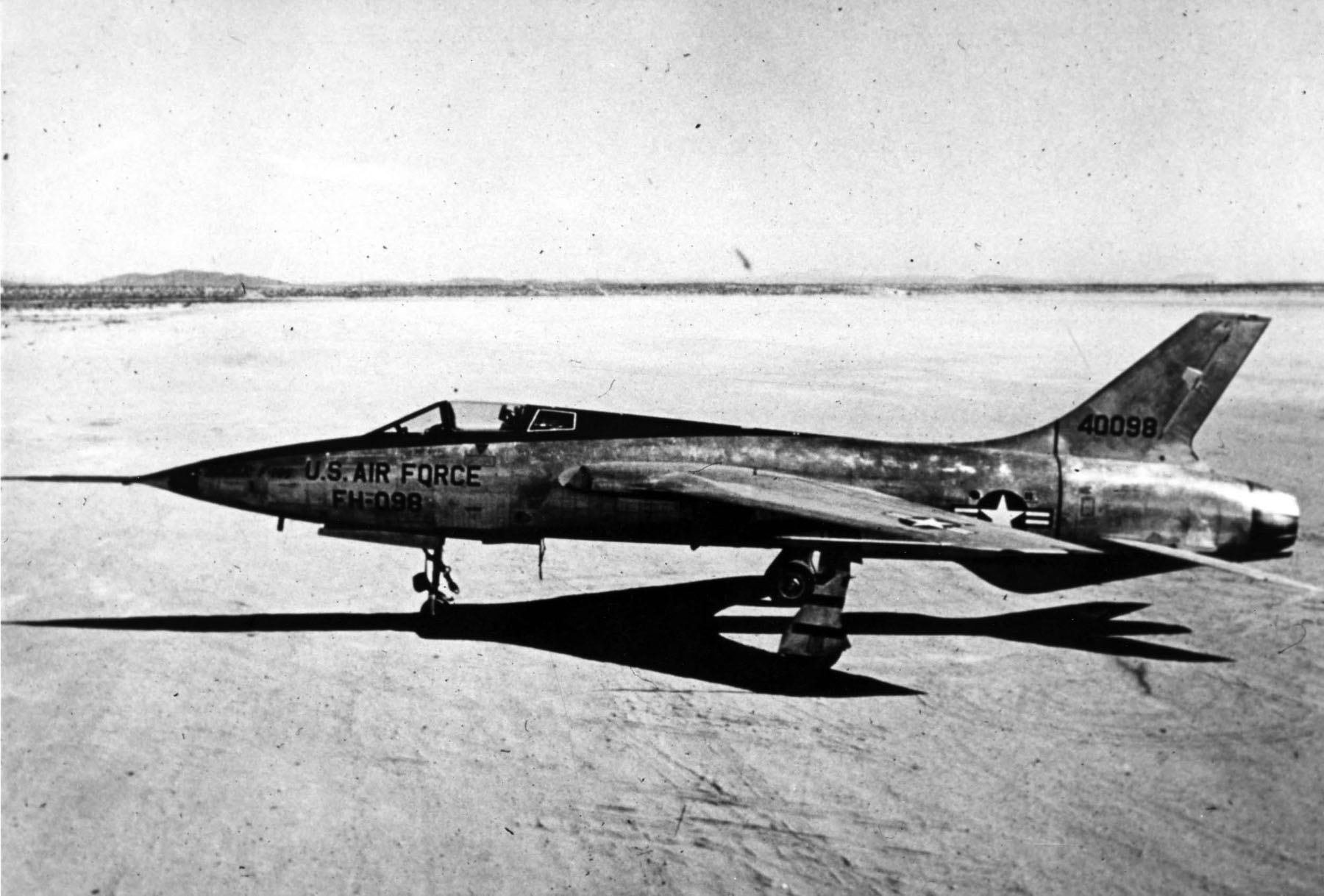
Republic YF-105A, AF Ser. No. 54-0098, the first of two prototypes

On 22 October 1955, the YF-105A prototype made its maiden flight. After 22 hours of flight time, the prototype was returned to the factory for repairs after sustaining major damage. The second YF-105A made its first flight on 28 January 1956. Despite being powered by a less potent J57-P-25 engine with 15,000 pounds-force (67 kN) of afterburning thrust, the first prototype attained the speed of Mach 1.2 on its maiden flight. (The J75 was expected to generate 24,500 lbf (109 kN) with afterburner.) Both aircraft featured conventional wing root air intakes and slab-sided fuselages typical of the early jets; Republic viewed the prototypes as not being representative of the true capability of the aircraft due to numerous changes that were enacted prior to production. Specifically, insufficient power and aerodynamic problems with transonic drag, as well as Convair's experience with their F-102, had led to a redesign of the fuselage to conform to the area rule, giving it a characteristic "wasp waist". The F-105's reworked air intake was designed with a unique forward-swept shape, which was derived from Antonio Ferri's work on the proposed Republic XF-103 ramjet-powered interceptor. In combination with the distinctive forward-swept variable-geometry air intakes, which regulated airflow to the engine at supersonic speeds, and the J75 engine, this redesign enabled the F-105B to attain Mach 2.15.

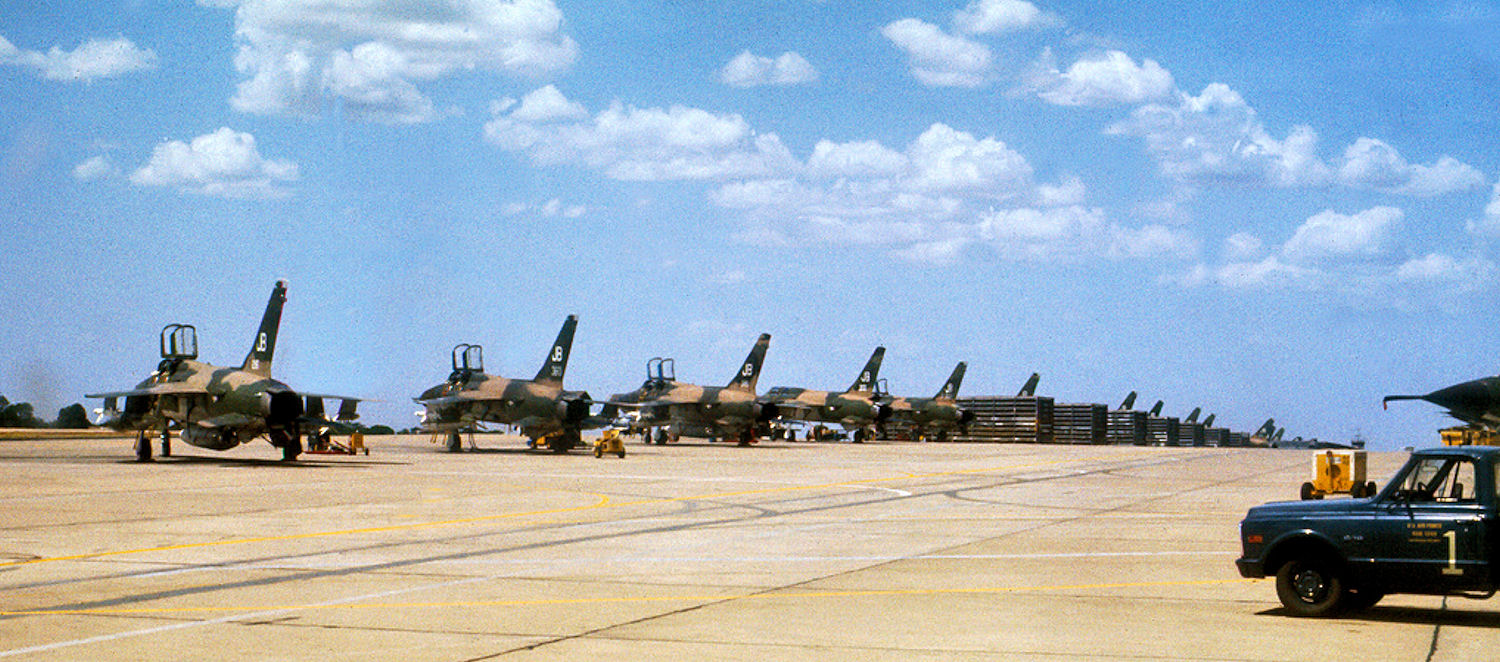
The 17th Wild Weasel squadron with a F-105 flightline. The F-105 was also used for "Wild Weasel" anti-radar missions carrying AGMs.

During March 1956, the USAF placed a further order for 65 F-105Bs and 17 RF-105Bs. In order to conduct the nuclear mission, an MA-8 fire control system, AN/APG-31 ranging radar, and K-19 gunsight to allow for toss bombing were integrated. On 26 May 1956, the first pre-production YF-105B made its maiden flight. Five of the F-105C trainer variant were added to the procurement plan in June 1956, before being canceled during 1957. The RF-105 reconnaissance variant was canceled in July 1956. The first production F-105B was accepted by the USAF on 27 May 1957. In June 1957, Republic Aviation requested that the F-105 be named Thunderchief, continuing the sequence of the company's Thunder-named aircraft: P-47 Thunderbolt, F-84 Thunderjet, and F-84F Thunderstreak. The USAF made this name official one month later.

=== Later development ===
To fulfill the USAF's requirement for an all-weather attack aircraft, Republic proposed the F-105D variant during 1957. This version featured an enlarged nose and radome housing the AN/ASG-19 Thunderstick bombing/navigation system. The AN/ASG-19 was designed around the Autonetics R-14A radar, which operated in both air-to-air and air-to-ground modes, and the AN/APN-131 Doppler navigation radar. In the cockpit, the F-105D featured vertical-tape instrument displays for adverse weather operation. The ability to carry the TX-43 nuclear weapon was also added. On account of these myriad changes, Republic noted the difficulty of using the same production line as had been used for the F-105B; production times would also be extended from 144 days to 214 days.

Development of the RF-105 reconnaissance model was restarted during the late 1950s, for a time based on the F-105D, before work on the model was cancelled for the final time on 23 December 1960. On 18 March 1959, the planned F-105E twin-seater was also cancelled due to its high cost; it was replaced on a one-to-one basis by additional F-105Ds. On 9 June 1959, the first F-105D took its maiden flight. Flight testing of the F-105D was somewhat less troubled than the less advanced F-105B, to the point where the D-model was ready for operational service ahead of its predecessor. Category II flight testing in late 1959 identified various key deficiencies on the F-105B, particularly with the MA-8 fire control system and autopilot of this variant. While eventually rectified successfully, it took time to develop and deploy appropriate modifications, putting the production programme further behind. By the start of 1960, none of the 56 F-105Bs that had been delivered were considered to be operationally ready.

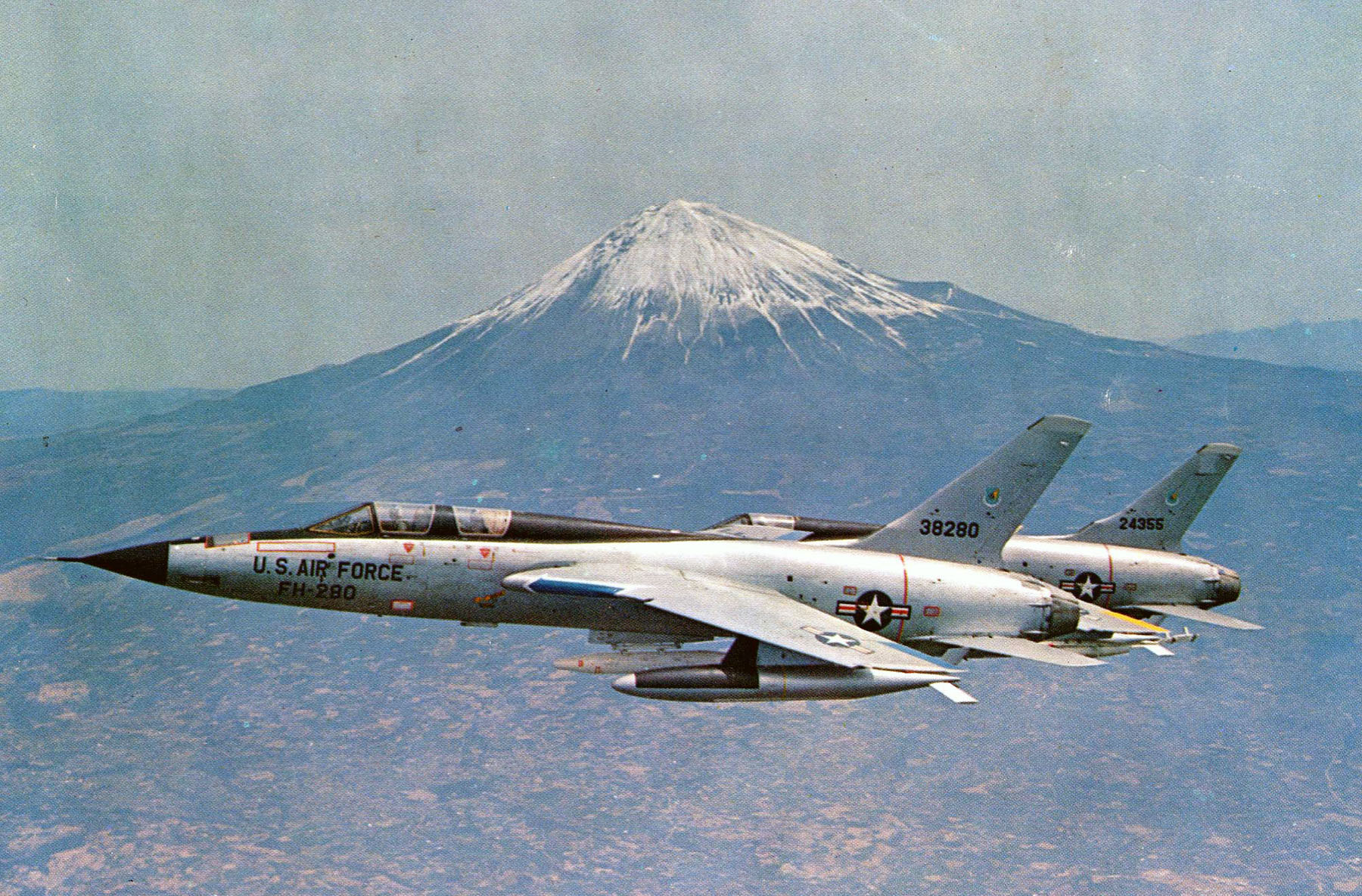
A USAF F-105F trainer and a F-105D with Mount Fuji in the background

At one point, there were plans in progress to procure in excess of 1,500 F-105Ds; however, production schedules continued to be missed, in part due to strikes by Republic's workforce, that impacted the USAF's plans for the type. Production of the F-105 was heavily impacted by the decision taken by Secretary of Defense Robert McNamara to equip no more than seven combat wings with the type. During November 1961, production of the type was cut in favor of the USAF adopting the Navy's F-4 Phantom II, and in the longer term, the General Dynamics F-111 Aardvark of the TFX program. While considerations towards reopening production of the F-105 were discussed in 1967, this interest did not ultimately see any such revival.

The final 143 Thunderchiefs built were of the two-seat F-105F trainer variant. Based on the F-105D, this model was 31 inches (79 cm) longer to provide room for the rear cockpit; otherwise, the aircraft had similar flight performance to the preceding F-105D. A total of 833 F-105s were completed before production ended in 1964. The F-105 had been designed for a short nuclear campaign, leading to shortcomings that became evident in a lengthy conventional war, such as a poor hydraulics layout and fuel tanks that were not self-sealing. Subsequent upgrades improved the reliability and weapons capacity of the existing F-105Ds. In response to the surface-to-air missile threat experienced in the skies above Vietnam, dozens of F-105Fs were converted into anti-radar "Wild Weasel" aircraft, culminating with the F-105G.

== Design ==
=== Overview ===
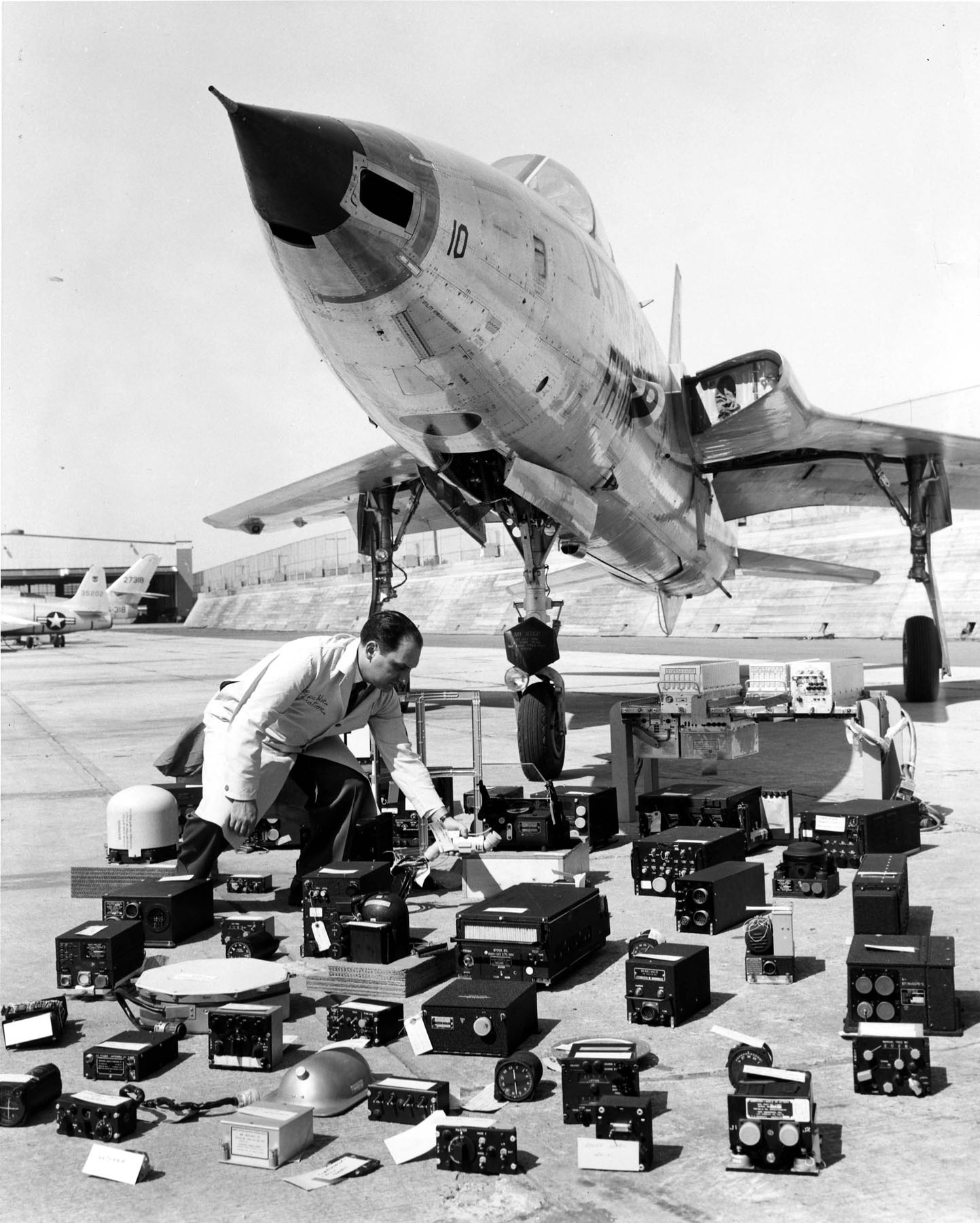
Front view of Republic F-105B with avionics layout

The F-105 was a mid-wing monoplane with a 45° swept wing and tail surfaces. The single engine was fed by two intakes in the wing roots, leaving the nose free for a radome housing the multi-mode radar. Its fuselage provided room for 1,184 US gallons (4,480 L) of fuel and an internal bomb bay. The bomb bay measured 15 feet 10 inches (4.83 m) by 32 in (0.81 m) by 32 in (0.81 m); it was originally designed to carry a single nuclear weapon but typically held an additional 350 US gal (1,300 L) fuel tank. It featured four under-wing and one centerline pylon; the two inner wing and centerline pylons were capable of accepting fuel from 450 and 650 US gal (1,700 and 2,500 L) drop tanks. Two outer dry stations were wired for missiles or bombs. One M61 Vulcan (initially designated T-171E3) 20 mm 6-barrel Gatling-style cannon was installed in the left side of the nose. A pair of short-range AIM-9 Sidewinder air-to-air missile could be carried on each of the outer wing pylons.

The F-105 was designed primarily for low-level interdiction and its low-altitude speed was its greatest asset when dealing with enemy fighters such as the MiG-17/J-5s and MiG-21. The F-105 managed 27.5 air-to-air victories. Based on combat experience, the F-105D was updated with a better ejection seat, additional armor, improved gun sights, and Electronic Counter Measures (ECM) pods on the wings.

=== Flight characteristics ===
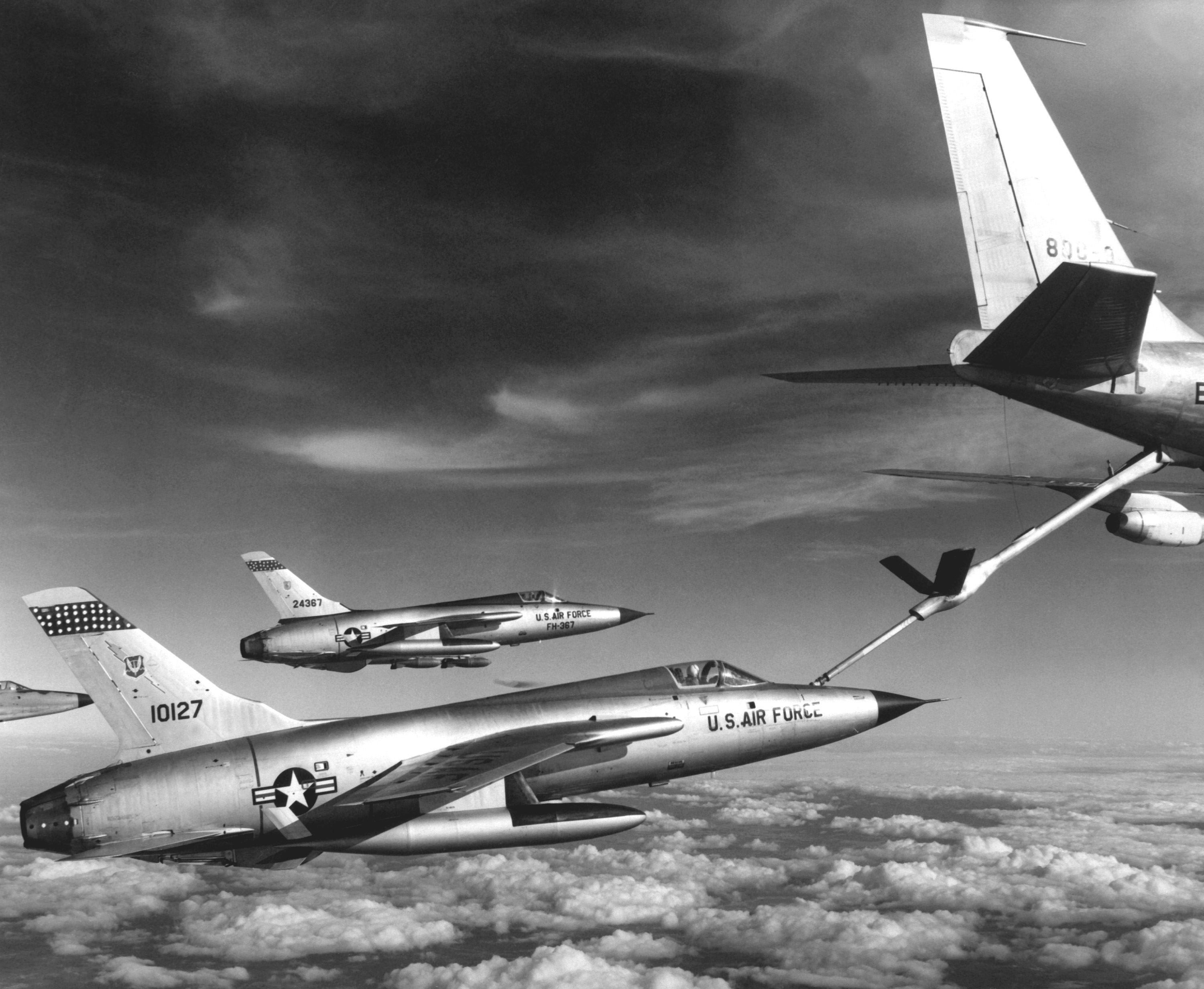
F-105D Thunderchiefs refueling from a Boeing KC-135 tanker

Former North American F-86 Sabre pilot Jerry Noel Hoblit recalled being in awe of the F-105's size after seeing it for the first time; he could not manage to reach the air intake lip even with a running jump. The F-105 had a spacious cockpit with good visibility and layout (particularly after the introduction of "tape" instruments); the advanced electronics were easy to learn and operate. Takeoffs and landings were often performed in the 230 mph (370 km/h) range. The spoilers provided good roll control at all speeds and the distinctive four-petal airbrakes (which also opened slightly when the afterburner was engaged to allow for the larger flow of exhaust gases) were highly effective even at supersonic speeds. Loss of control due to a spin or complications of adverse yaw required deliberate effort from the pilot and spontaneous spin recovery was rapid.

The initial reaction of the fighter pilot community to their new aircraft was lukewarm. Between its massive dimensions and troubled early service life, the F-105 had garnered a number of uncomplimentary nicknames. In addition to the aforementioned "Thud", nicknames included the "Squat Bomber", "Lead Sled", and the "Hyper Hog" and/or "Ultra Hog". The latter two names arose from the F-105's predecessors, the Republic F-84 Thunderjet and F-84F Thunderstreak, nicknamed "Hog" and "Super Hog", respectively. According to F-105 pilots and crews, the "Thud" nickname was inspired by the character "Chief Thunderthud" from the Howdy Doody television series.

20mm M61 Vulcan firing test aboard an F-105D Thunderchief.

The aircraft's offensive capabilities were sarcastically referred to as a "Triple Threat"—it could bomb you, strafe you, or fall on you. Positive aspects, such as the F-105's responsive controls, strong performance at high speed and low altitude, and its outfit of electronics won over some pilots. For some, "Thud" was a term of endearment; retroactively the RF-84F Thunderflash became known as "Thud's Mother". F-105 pilot Colonel Jack Broughton said of the nickname: "The Thud has justified herself, and the name that was originally spoken with a sneer has become one of utmost respect through the air fraternity".

=== Special modifications ===
==== Commando Nail ====
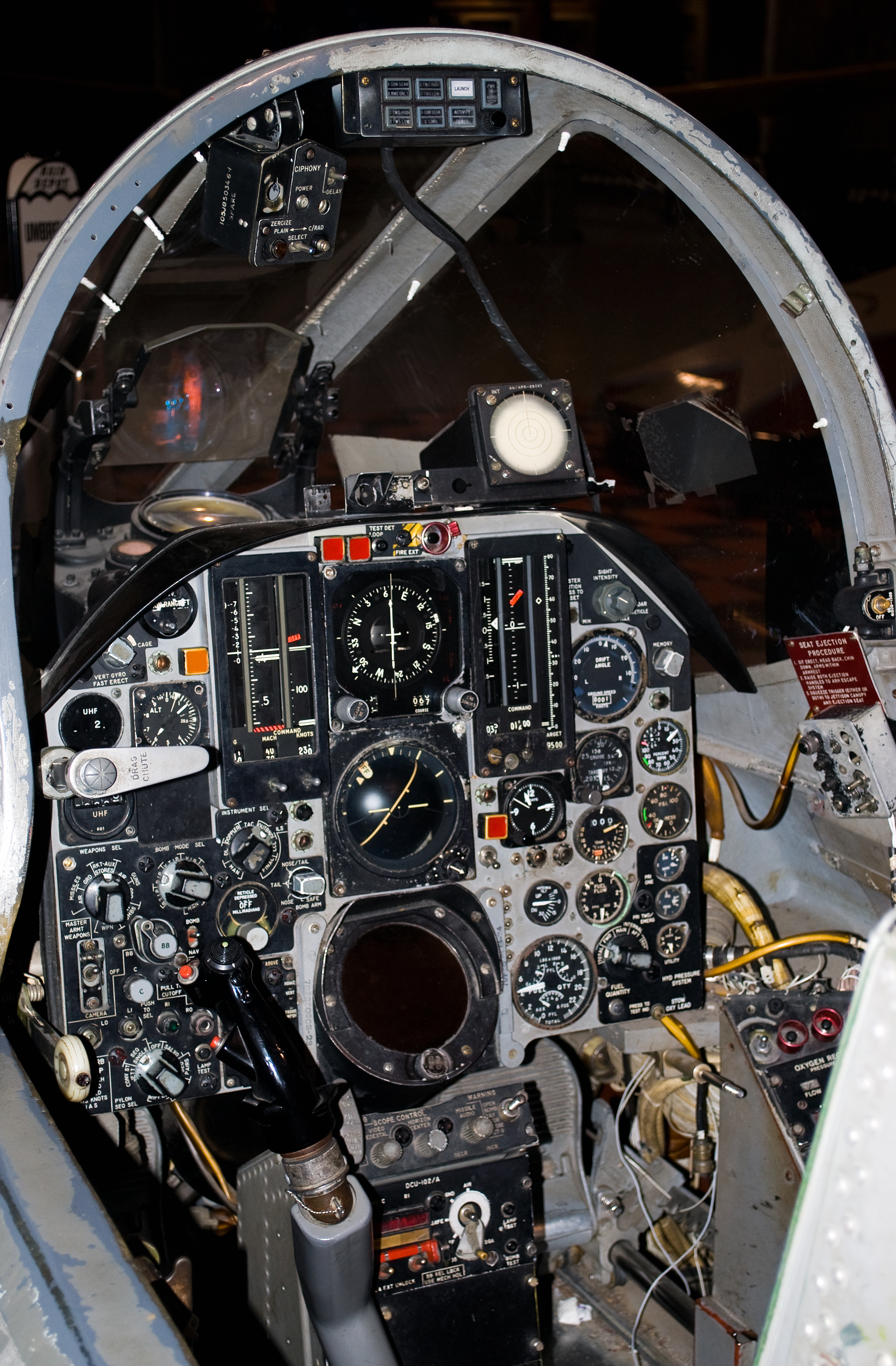
The cockpit of an F-105 Thunderchief

The rear cockpits of several two-seat F-105Fs were modified under project Commando Nail with an R-14A radar and a radar scope that offered high resolution. These aircraft were used for all-weather and night low-level strikes against especially dangerous targets by a unit from the 13th Tactical Fighter Squadron (1966–1975) dubbed "Ryan's Raiders" starting in April 1967. Some of these aircraft were later converted to the Wild Weasel III standard.

In an effort to thwart MiG attacks, several F-105Fs were also fitted with Hallicrafters QRC-128 communication jamming system under project Combat Martin. The North Vietnamese interceptor force followed Soviet air-defense doctrine, with pilots under rigid direction of ground controllers over radio links. The QRC-128, nicknamed "Colonel Computer", filled up the rear cockpit of the F-105F. It bounced voice communications over the radio channel back out after a delay, resulting in an obnoxious garble. However, the first time the Combat Martin was used, the US National Security Agency (NSA), in charge of US strategic signals intelligence, ordered the Air Force to cease and desist immediately, since the NSA believed that the intelligence obtained by monitoring the channels outweighed the benefits of jamming them.

==== Thunderstick II ====
Experience in Vietnam demonstrated the need for a better visual and blind bombing capability. In March 1968, the Air Force ordered development of an upgraded bombing/navigation system, incorporating a Singer-General Precision inertial navigation system, improvements to the AN/APN-131 navigation radar, and solid-state circuitry for the R-14A radar, which was redesignated R-14K. Furthermore, the digital AN/ARN-92 long-range navigation receiver replaced the problematic AN/ARN-85 receiver. The additional avionics were housed in a long, raised dorsal spine. The modified bombing/navigation system was known as Thunderstick II. F-105s with this system could achieve a bombing circular error of probability (CEP) of 50 feet (15 m) from an altitude of 15,000 ft (4,600 m). Although the first Thunderstick II aircraft flew in 1969, they were not used in Vietnam. A total of 30 F-105Ds received this modification. They were initially assigned to the 563TFS/23TFW at McConnell AFB. In the summer 1972, they were all transferred to the newly reactivated 457TFS (AFRES) at Carswell AFB. This remained the only unit to fly the Thunderstick II until its retirement in 1981–82.

=== Wild Weasel ===
In 1965, the USAF began operating two-seat North American F-100F Super Sabres specially equipped for Suppression of Enemy Air Defenses (SEAD) missions in Vietnam. Nicknamed the Wild Weasel, these aircraft achieved a number of victories against North Vietnamese surface-to-air missile radars. The second crew member was a Navigator trained as an Electronic Warfare Officer (EWO) to decipher sensor information and guide the pilot towards the targets. However, the F-100F was an interim solution, since its limited payload often required multiple aircraft to conduct a successful strike; it also lacked the speed and endurance to effectively protect the F-105.

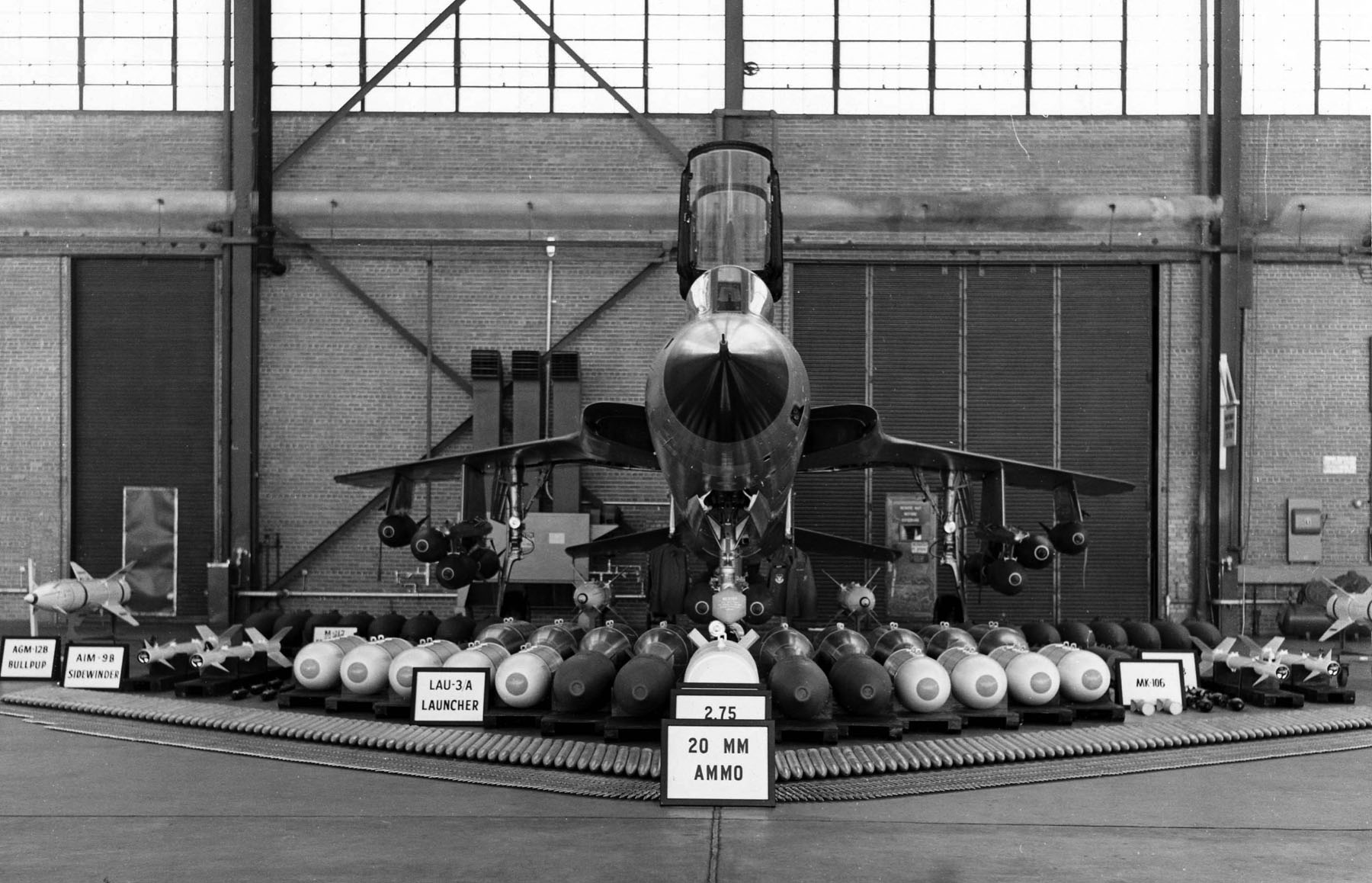
F-105F with armament layout in August 1964; including 20 mm (0.79 in) cannon rounds, 2.75 in (70 mm) rockets, Bullpup and Sidewinder missiles, general-purpose bomb, cluster bombs, LAU-3A Launchers, flare and chaff dispensers and drop tanks.

The resulting EF-105F Wild Weasel III (Note: The Wild Weasel IA and II designations referred to experimental conversions of F-105Ds and F-105Fs respectively which were used to evaluate various sensor and Electronic countermeasure (ECM) equipment. The Wild Weasel III used similar avionics to the Wild Weasel I F-100s.) (the EF designation was popularly used but unofficial) supplemented its sensors and electronic jamming equipment with AGM-45 Shrike anti-radiation missiles and conventional bombs, giving it an offensive capability lacking in the F-100F. The first of these aircraft flew on 15 January 1966 and they began arriving in Southeast Asia in May, flying their first mission on 6 June 1966, with five assigned to the 13th TFS at Korat RTAFB and six more to the 354th TFS at Takhli RTAFB.

In a typical early mission, a single EF-105F would accompany one or two flights of F-105Ds to provide protection from enemy ground fire. While this strategy was effective in reducing F-105D losses, the Weasel aircraft suffered heavy casualties with five of the first 11 lost in July and August 1966. Attacks into high-risk environments saw the Weasels operating in "Iron Hand" hunter-killer flights of mixed single-seat and two-seat Thunderchiefs, suppressing sites during attacks by the strike force and attacking others en route. In the fall of 1967, EF-105Fs began to be upgraded to the definitive Wild Weasel Thunderchief, the F-105G.

The F-105G incorporated a considerable amount of new SEAD-specific avionics, including an upgraded Radar Homing and Warning (RHAW) system which required a redesign of the wingtips. To free outboard hardpoints for additional weapons, the Westinghouse AN/ALQ-105 electronic countermeasures were permanently installed in two long blisters on the underside of the fuselage. Thirty aircraft were fitted with pylons to carry the AGM-78 Standard anti-radiation missile. On a typical mission, the F-105G carried two Shrikes on outboard pylons, a single Standard on an inboard pylon balanced by a 450 US gal (1,700 L) fuel tank on the other side, and a 650 US gal (2,500 L) centerline fuel tank.

=== Costs ===
	F-105B	F-105D	F-105F/G
Unit R&D cost	2,716 prorated per aircraft		
Airframe	4,914,016	1,472,145	1,524,000
Engine	328,797	244,412	290,000
Electronics	141,796	19,346	251,000
Armament	232,913	167,621	154,000
Ordnance	32,021	19,346	21,000
Flyaway cost	5,649,543	2,140,000	2,200,000
Modification costs by 1973	261,793	282,687	701,645 plus 1,803 for F-105G conversion
Cost per flying hour		1,020	1,020
Maintenance cost per flying hour	718	809	808
Notes: The costs above are in approximately 1960 United States dollars and have not been adjusted for inflation.

== Operational history ==
=== Introduction ===
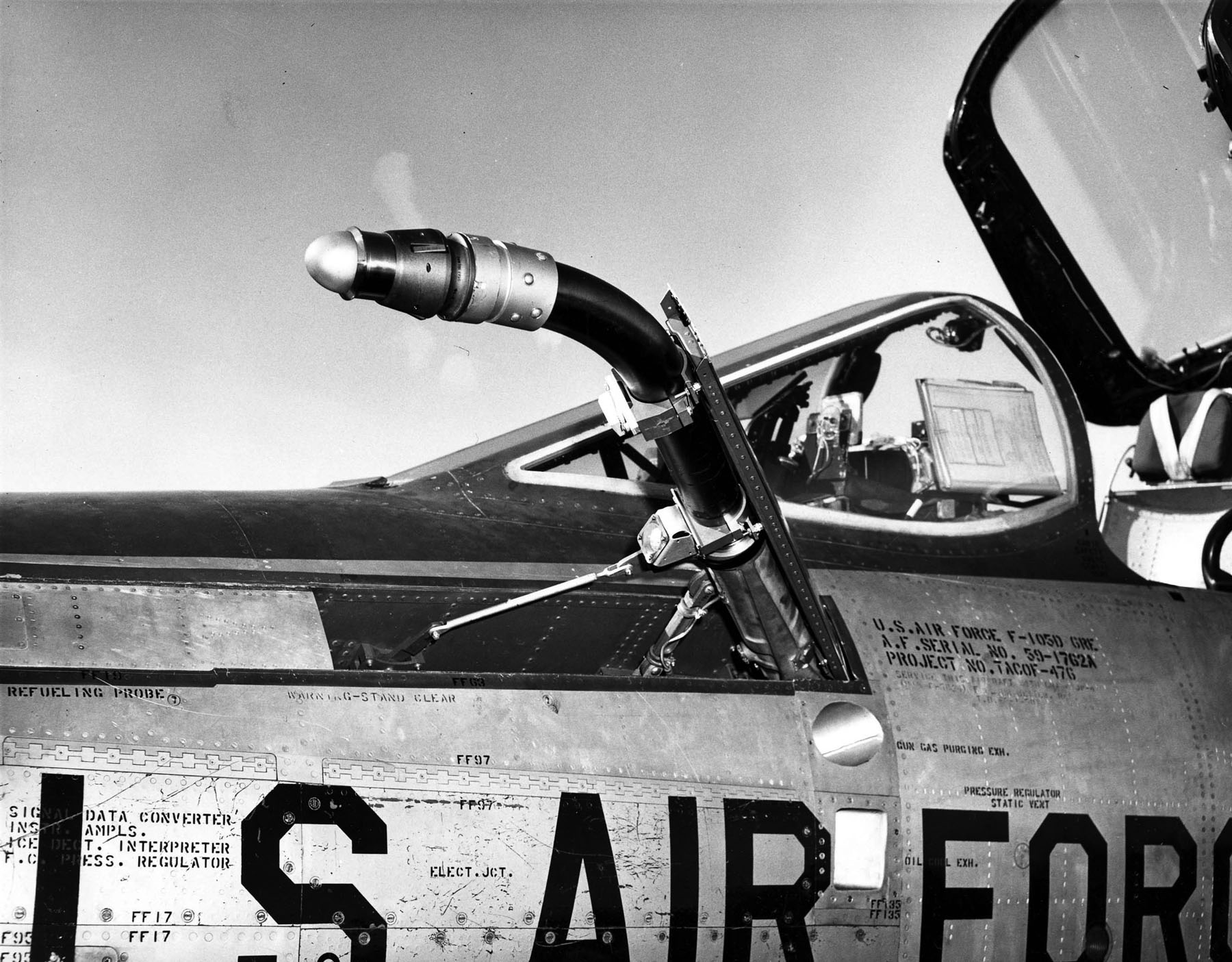
F-105D refueling probe detail. The -D model had two types of in-flight refueling equipment: a probe (for the drogue) and a receptacle (for the boom).

The F-105B entered USAF service with the Tactical Air Command's 335th Tactical Fighter Squadron of the 4th Tactical Fighter Wing in August 1958, although the squadron did not become fully operational until 1959. On 11 December 1959, an F-105B piloted by Brig Gen Joseph Moore (commander of the 4th Tactical Fighter Wing) set a world record of 1,216.48 miles per hour (1,958 km/h) over a 62 miles (100 km) circuit. Difficulties with its avionics and the MA-8 fire-control system were experienced early on; typically the F-105 required 150 hours of maintenance for each flying hour. Most of these problems were addressed under Project Optimize. The lack of spares resulted in the entire F-105B fleet being briefly grounded in 1960. In 1964, modified F-105Bs with ballast replacing the cannon, fuselage and wing reinforcement for aerobatics, and the addition of a smoke generator, briefly flew with the United States Air Force Thunderbirds demonstration team. After only six shows, a fatal accident from overstressing the airframe led to the reintroduction of the F-100 Super Sabre.

By 1964, the F-105B was relegated to USAF Air National Guard (ANG) squadrons. It was replaced in frontline service by the definitive F-105D whose advanced NASARR R-14A radar and AN/ASG-19 Thunderstick fire-control system gave it all-weather capability. The R-14A radar also added a terrain-avoidance radar capability, while a completely new instrument panel was fitted, replacing dial-type instrument with vertical tape instruments which were easier to read in combat. In order to accommodate the new radar, with a much larger radar dish, the forward fuselage was redesigned, increasing overall length by 16 inches (41 cm).

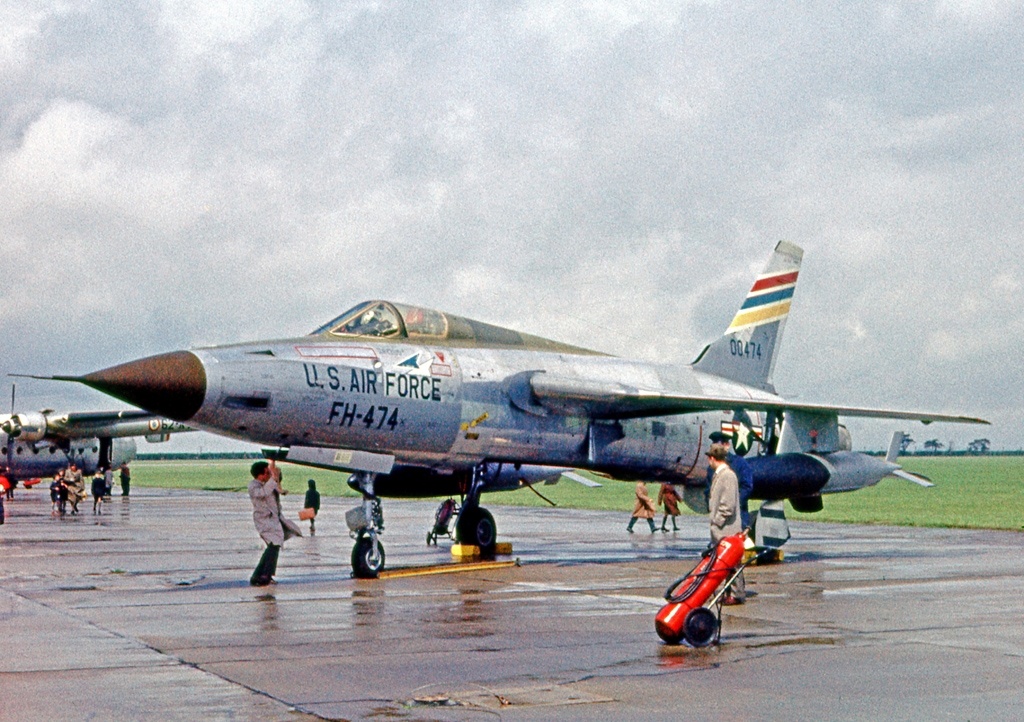
Republic F-105D of 36 Tactical Fighter Wing based at Bitburg, West Germany, in 1962

The F-105D entered service with the 335th TFS in September 1960, although it was not fully operational on the F-105D until early 1961. The first overseas F-105 units formed in West Germany in 1961, with the 36th Tactical Fighter Wing at Bitburg Air Base in May and the 49th Tactical Fighter Wing at Spangdahlem Air Base in October. Both wings had a primary tactical nuclear strike role for NATO. The F-105D was also deployed to the Pacific, with the 18th Tactical Fighter Wing at Kadena in Okinawa converting in 1962 and the 8th Tactical Fighter Wing converting from 1963.

Like the F-105B, the F-105D's early career was plagued with maintenance problems and in-flight failures. The origins of the nickname "Thud" were obscure; some claim that it stood for the sound of an F-105 crashing into the ground. The entire F-105D fleet was grounded in December 1961 and then again in June 1962. Many of the issues were worked out during the production run and by 1964, early F-105Ds were upgraded with these fixes under Project Look Alike, although engine failures and fuel system problems persisted until 1967.

Declassified tactical weapons effects tests of the U.S. Air Force century series aircraft

Meanwhile, the USAF was gradually changing the anticipated F-105 mission from nuclear interdiction to conventional bombing. The Look Alike upgrades increased the aircraft's capacity from four to 16 conventional 750 lb (340 kg) bombs on underwing and fuselage centerline hardpoints and added the equipment to launch AGM-12 Bullpup air-to-ground missiles. In June 1961, an F-105D delivered 15,430 lb (7,000 kg) of conventional bombs during a USAF test—at the time, a record for a single-engine aircraft with a payload three times heavier than American four-engine heavy bombers of World War II, such as the Boeing B-17 Flying Fortress and the Consolidated B-24 Liberator, though aerial refueling would be required for long missions. One of the F-105Ds was named Memphis Belle II after the famed World War II B-17.

=== Vietnam War ===
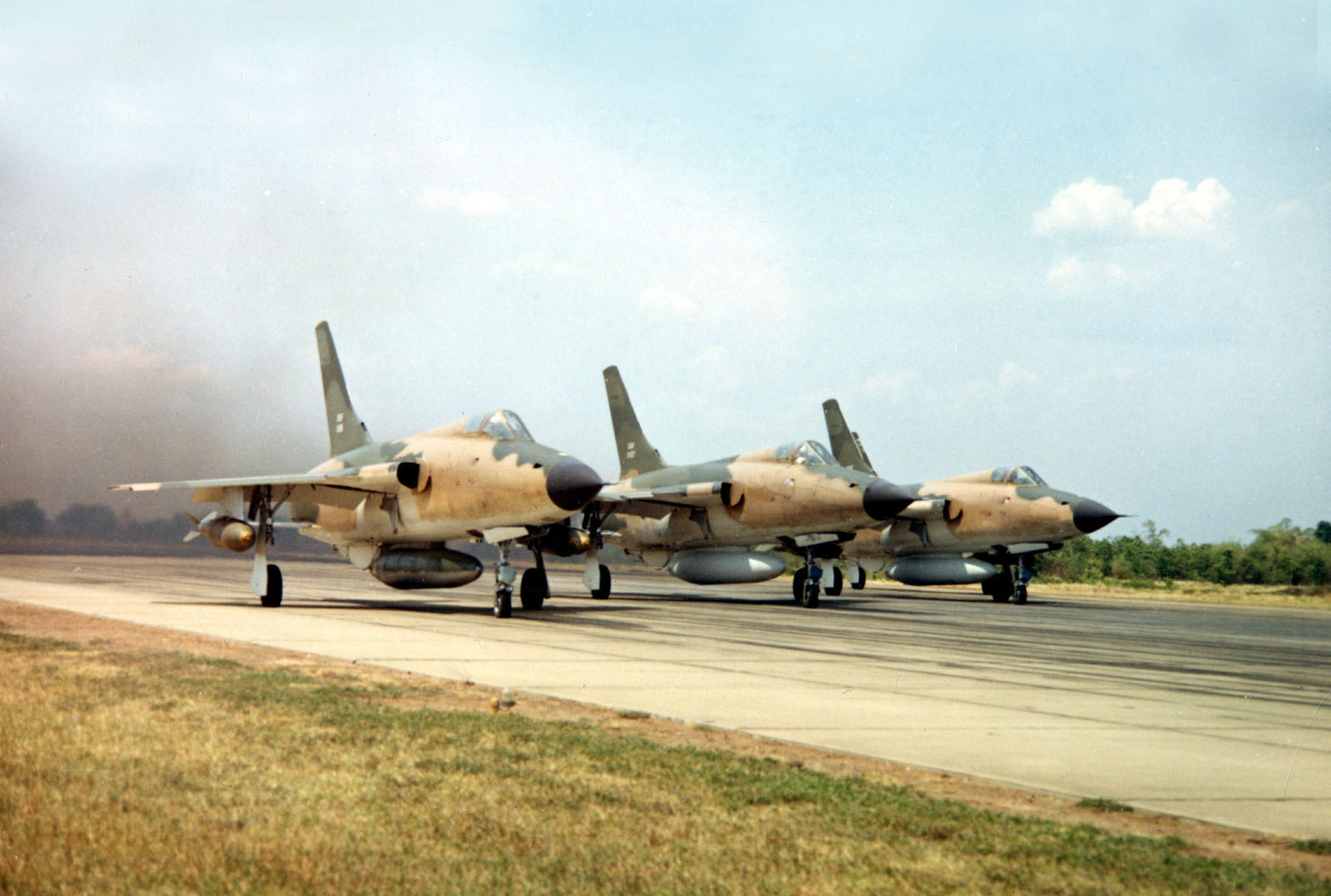
F-105s take off on a mission to bomb North Vietnam, 1966

In spite of a troubled early service life, the F-105 became the dominant attack aircraft early in the Vietnam War. The F-105 could carry more than twice the bomb load farther and faster than the F-100, which was used mostly in South Vietnam. In a foreshadowing of its Wild Weasel role, the first F-105D combat mission of the war involved an attack on 14 August 1964 against an anti-aircraft artillery site on Plaine des Jarres. This mission was carried out by aircraft of the 36th TFS, 6441st Tactical Fighter Wing deployed from Yokota Air Base, Japan to Korat Royal Thai Air Force Base, Thailand. The first Thunderchief lost in the war also occurred during this mission, although the pilot managed to return the aircraft to Korat. The first strike mission took place on 13 January 1965 with the destruction of the Ban Ken bridge in Laos. In early 1965 additional F-105 squadrons were deployed to Korat and Takhli air bases in Thailand. At the start of Operation Rolling Thunder in March 1965, large numbers of F-105Ds were shipped to these bases to participate in intense bombing missions.

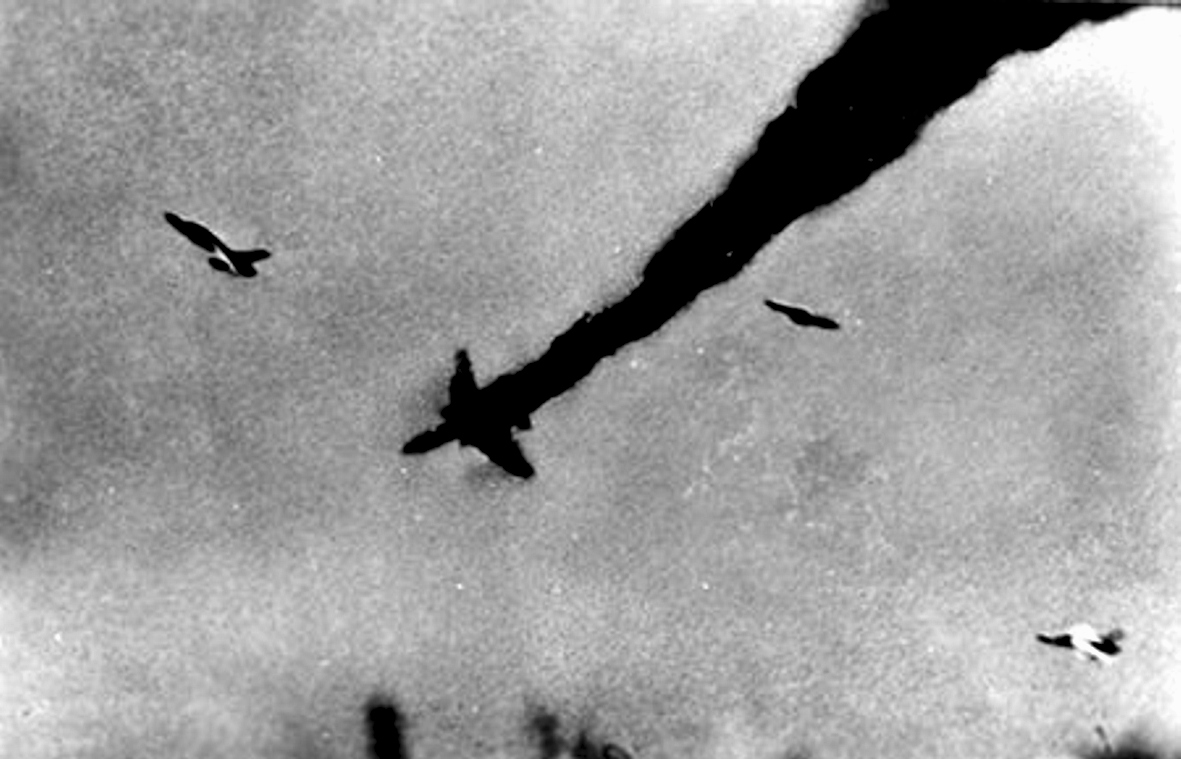
A U.S. Air Force F-105D Thunderchief shot down over North Vietnam.

On 3 April 1965, a total of 79 aircraft, including 45 F-105 Thunderchiefs, were sent against the Thanh Hoa Bridge, nicknamed "Dragon's Jaw". The next day, enemy MiGs were encountered during a second run upon the bridge; a total of eight MiG-17s faced 46 F-105s escorted by a MiGCAP flight of 21 F-100 Super Sabres. The MiG-17s evaded the escorts using altitude and cloud cover, instead focusing upon the bomb-laden Thunderchiefs. Two Thunderchiefs were lost to the MiG-17s; a third, thought to be lost to ground fire, was later claimed by the North as downed by a MiG-17. One F-105 piloted narrowly escaped. USAF Chief of Staff General John P. McConnell was "hopping mad" to hear that two F-105s had been shot down by Korean War-era subsonic North Vietnamese MiGs. The Thanh Hoa Bridge proved resistant to aerial bombing; multiple missions were flown to damage the bridge both by F-105s and U.S. Navy aircraft.

On 24 July 1965, four U.S. Air Force McDonnell F-4C Phantoms took part in an airstrike against the Dien Ben Phu munitions storage depot and the Lang Chi munitions factory west of Hanoi. One was shot down and three were damaged by SA-2 missiles. After two days, President Johnson gave the order to attack all known SA-2 positions which had been discovered outside the 30-mile exclusion zone. On the morning of 27 July, 48 F-105s participated in the Operation Spring High attack. But the Vietnamese knew U.S. aircraft were coming and set up many 23mm and 37mm anti-aircraft guns at the site. These anti-aircraft guns were lethal at close range and the Vietnamese shot down six aircraft, while more than half of the remaining U.S. aircraft suffered damage from ground fire. Both surface-to-air missile sites were devoid of missiles and equipment, and the Vietnamese had substituted white-painted bundles of bamboo for the real SA-2s. Operation Spring High destroyed two worthless targets at the cost of six aircraft and five pilots.

In December 1966, the Vietnam People's Air Force (VPAF)'s MiG-21 pilots of the 921st Regiment claimed to have downed 14 F-105s without any losses.

On a typical combat mission into North Vietnam, the F-105D carried two 450 US gal (1,700 L) wing-mounted fuel tanks, a 390 US gal (1,500 L) fuel tank in the bomb bay, and five 1,000 lb (450 kg) or six 750 lb (340 kg) bombs, and required inflight refueling going to and sometimes returning from Hanoi 700 mi (1,100 km) distant. F-105s flying in the vicinity of Hanoi would routinely travel around mountainous terrain nicknamed Thud Ridge to evade the air defenses surrounding the city. Colonel Jack Broughton, an F-105 pilot in Vietnam, noted the demands of flying close to Hanoi gave "simply no room for error".

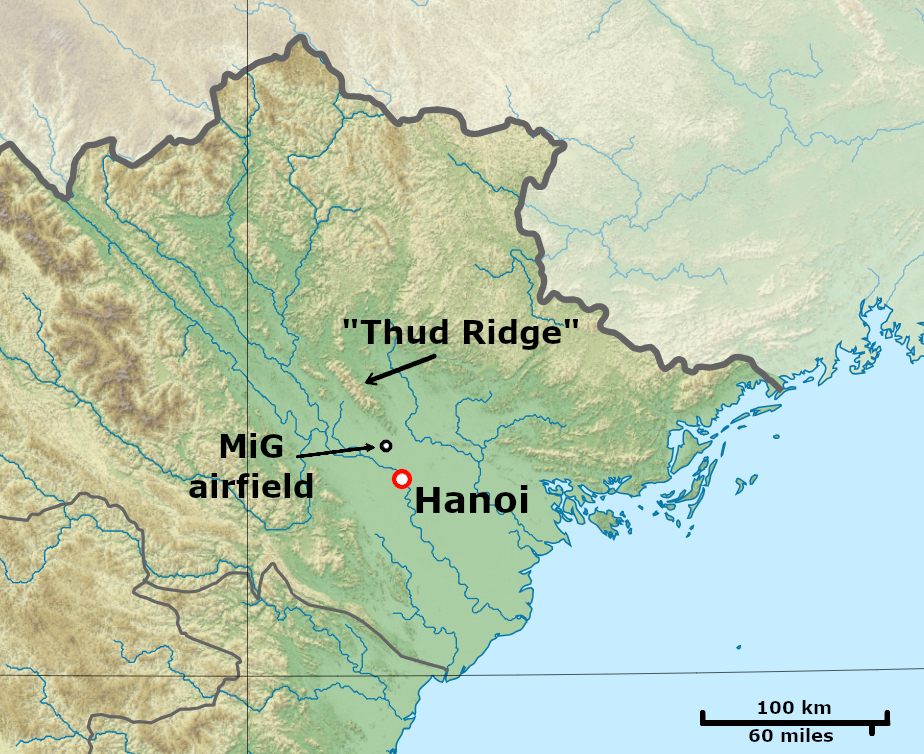
Location of the Thud Ridge (21°16′47″N 105°49′37″E) and the MiG airfield on its southern tip

On 11 August 1967, F-105Ds from 335th Tactical Fighter Squadron with support from F-105 Wild Weasels from 338th Tactical Fighter Squadron made the first of many successful attacks on the Paul Doumer bridge over the Red River. Flying low-altitude missions and conducting dive bombings forced the F-105s into range of North Vietnamese anti-aircraft guns, sometimes coming under heavy fire.

USAF F-105s were escorted by F-4s to protect them against enemy fighters. However, the Thunderchief was officially credited with 27.5 air-to-air victories against VPAF aircraft at the cost of 17 aircraft lost to enemy fighters (North Vietnamese pilots claimed to have shot down an additional 23 F-105s but none have been confirmed by USAF). All victories were against MiG-17s. Of these 24.5 were shot down with cannon fire (one victory was shared with an F-4), and three with AIM-9 Sidewinder missiles. One F-105F is unofficially credited with downing three MiGs—one by air-to-air missile, the second by cannon fire and the third by jettisoning the centerline rack full of bombs directly into the path of a surprised MiG.

On 31 May 1968, a dedication ceremony took place at the United States Air Force Academy to honor graduates who had served in Vietnam. An F-105, which had been assembled using parts from ten different F-105s that had seen service in Vietnam, was placed on permanent static display. The ceremony included the entire cadet wing, the superintendent and commandant of cadets of the USAFA, a representative of Republic Aircraft, members of the press, among others. To conclude the ceremony, a flight of four F-105s from McConnell AFB were to fly over in formation at 1,000 feet above the ground and then fly over singly at 250 feet. The formation portion happened as planned. But the flight leader, Lt Col James "Black Matt" Matthews, came back for the single-file pass and exceeded the speed of sound at less than 100 feet. The ensuing sonic boom broke hundreds of windows and fifteen people sustained cuts.

==== Medal of Honor recipients ====
Two Wild Weasel pilots received the Medal of Honor:

- USAF Captain Merlyn H. Dethlefsen was awarded the Medal of Honor and Capt Kevin "Mike" Gilroy the Air Force Cross for an F-105F Wild Weasel mission on 10 March 1967, flying F-105F, serial number 63-8352. After their aircraft was damaged by ground fire, Dethlefsen and Gilroy elected to stay in the skies above the steel works at Thai Nguyen until the surface-to-air missile site was found and destroyed.
- USAF Captain Leo K. Thorsness was awarded the Medal of Honor and Capt Harold Johnson the Air Force Cross for an F-105F Wild Weasel mission on 19 April 1967, flying F-105F, serial number 63-8301. Thorsness and Johnson protected an attempted rescue of another Wild Weasel crew that had been shot down, in the process destroying two MiG-17s. After running out of ammunition, Thorsness and Johnson continued to act as decoys to draw the MiGs away from the rescue aircraft.

=== Phase-out and retirement ===
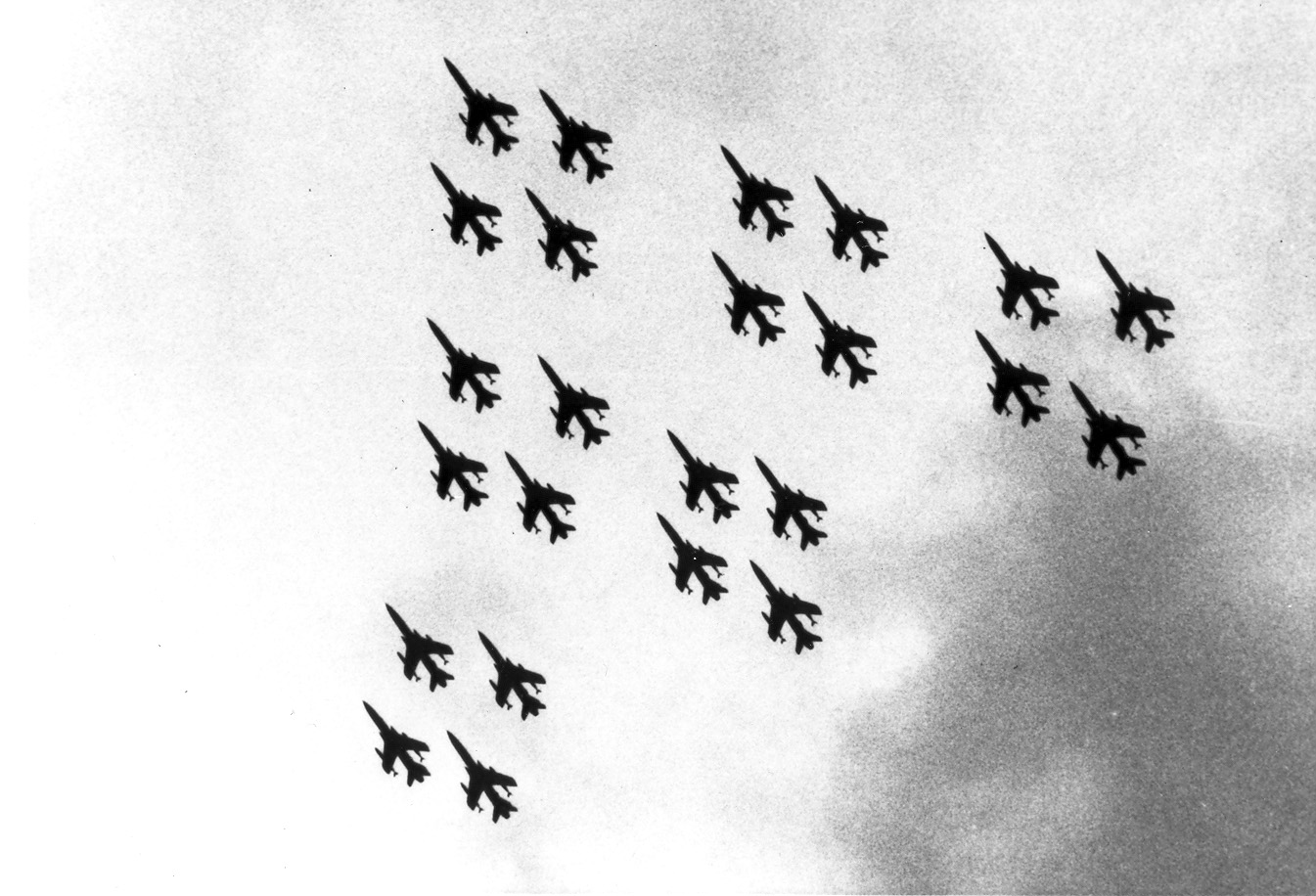
The 24-ship flyover formation, Diamonds on Diamonds, flew at the F-105 retirement at Hill Air Force Base, Utah on 4 June 1983

As production of F-105s had ended, the type was replaced in the Vietnam War by other aircraft, primarily the F-4 Phantom II. In October 1970, the 355th Tactical Fighter Wing, which was based at Takhli RTAFB, Thailand, and was the last F-105D unit in Southeast Asia, began to return to the U.S. The F-105G Wild Weasel versions soldiered on until the end of the war. They were gradually replaced by F-4G Wild Weasel IVs.

The Thunderchief was rapidly withdrawn from USAF service after the end of the Vietnam War. Of the 833 F-105s built, a combined 395 F-105s were lost in Southeast Asia, including 334 (296 F-105Ds and 38 two-seaters) lost to enemy action and 61 lost in operational accidents. Following the war the USAF began transferring the remaining aircraft to Air Force Reserve (AFRES) and Air National Guard (ANG) units. By the late 1970s, these aging Thunderchiefs were becoming difficult to maintain. The last F-105Gs with the 128th Tactical Fighter Squadron of the Georgia ANG were retired on 25 May 1983. The last flight of the F-105 Thunderchief was by the AFRES 466th Tactical Fighter Squadron with F-105Ds on 25 February 1984.

== Variants ==
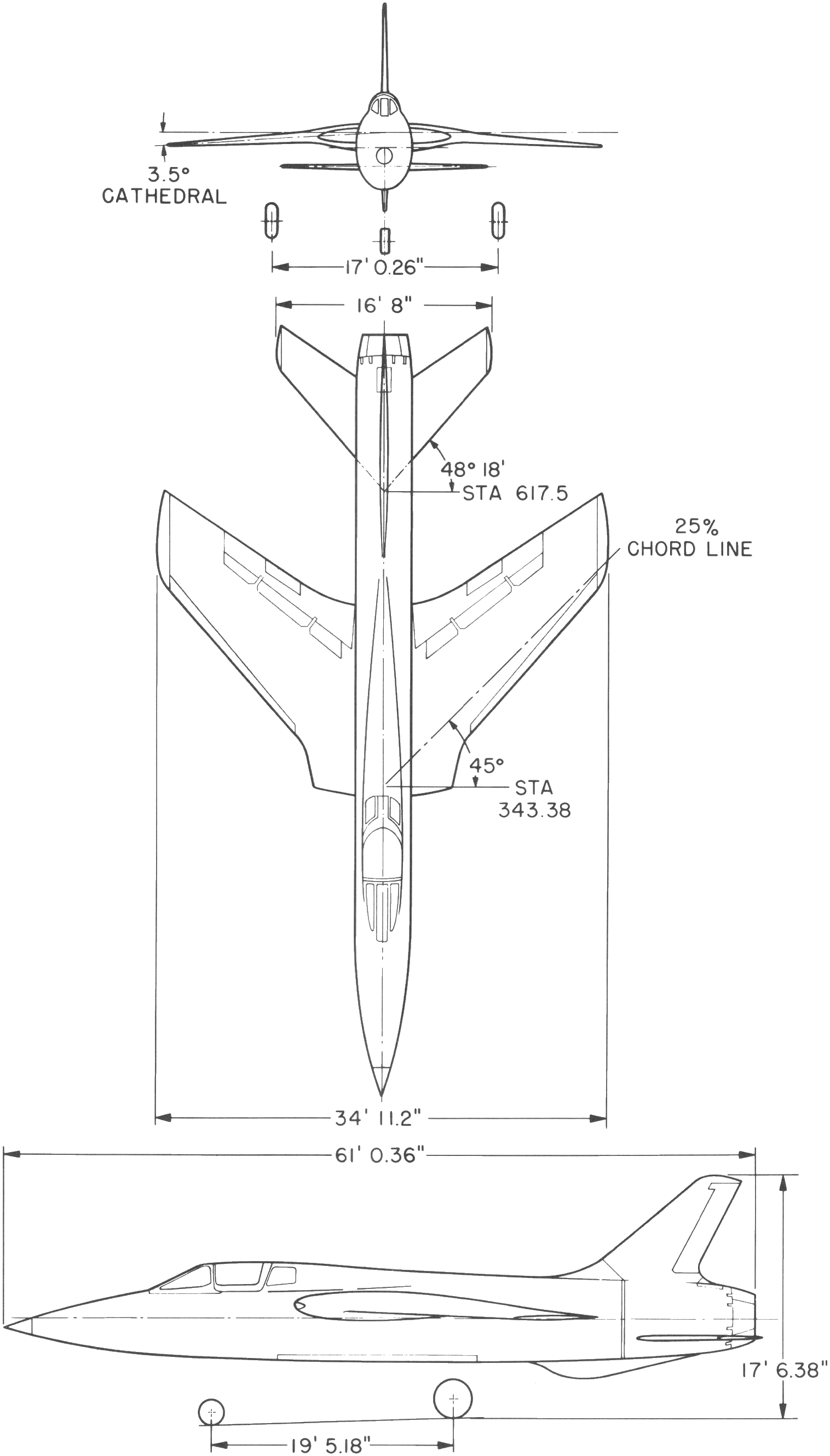
A 3-view line drawing of the YF-105A

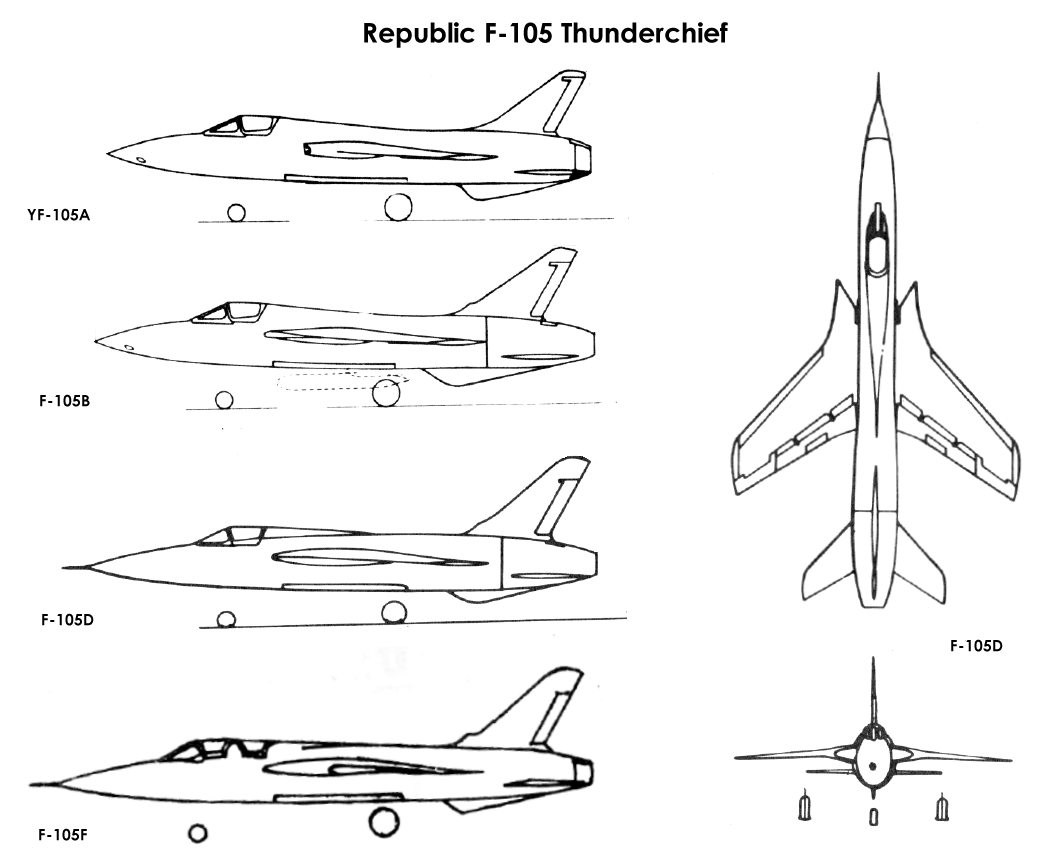
drawings of F-105 variants

YF-105A
Two pre-production prototypes with P&W J57 engine model.
YF-105B
Four pre-production aircraft with P&W J75 engine.
F-105B
Initial production model with AN/APN-105 navigational radar, 71 built.
JF-105B
Test aircraft built from re-allocated RF-105B airframes; three built.
RF-105B
Proposed reconnaissance version of the F-105B; none built. Three were ordered but completed as JF-105Bs.
F-105C
Proposed dual-control trainer; canceled in 1957, none built.
F-105D
The definitive production model, all-weather capability because of advanced avionics, including AN/APN-131 navigational radar; 610 built.
RF-105D
Proposed reconnaissance version of the F-105D; none built.
F-105E
Proposed trainer version of F-105D; cancelled in 1959, none completed.
F-105F
Two-seat trainer version of F-105D with lengthened forward fuselage. It was fully combat-capable and had dual controls, taller fin, and increased takeoff weight; its first flight took place on 11 June 1963. A total of 143 were built.
EF-105F
Initial designation for a Wild Weasel/Defense suppression version, 54 converted from F-105Fs.
F-105G
Two-seat Wild Weasel, improved version of the EF-105F.
F-105H
Proposed upgraded two-seat variant based on the F-105F with a larger wing with folding wing tips, nose, larger vertical tail, larger stabiliator, and modified landing gear. Never built.

== Operators ==
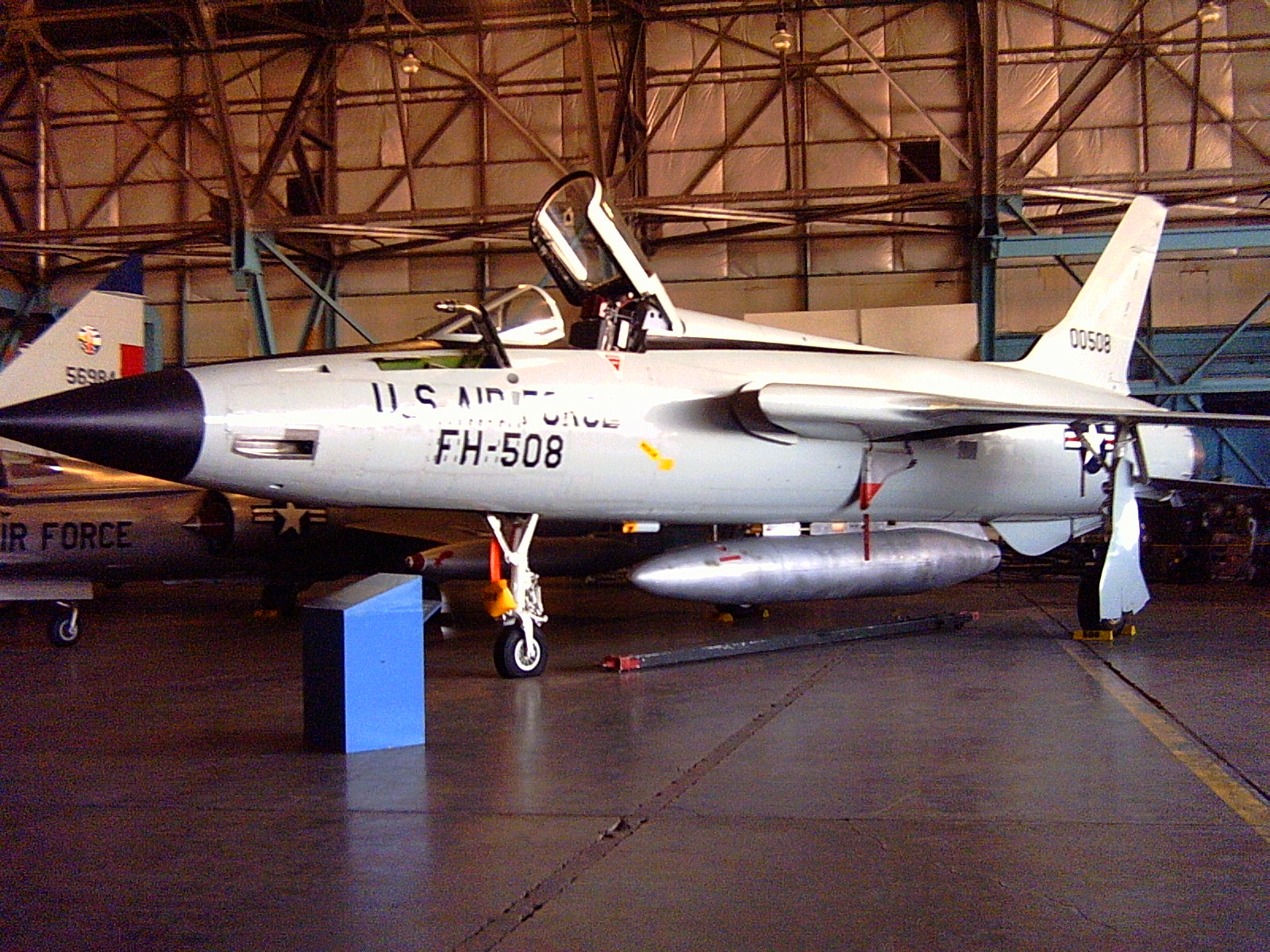
F-105D 60-0508, formerly with 49th TFW, at Wings Over the Rockies Museum, Denver, Colorado

United States

- United States Air Force
- United States Air Force Thunderbirds
- Air Force Reserve
- Air National Guard

== Specifications (F-105D) ==
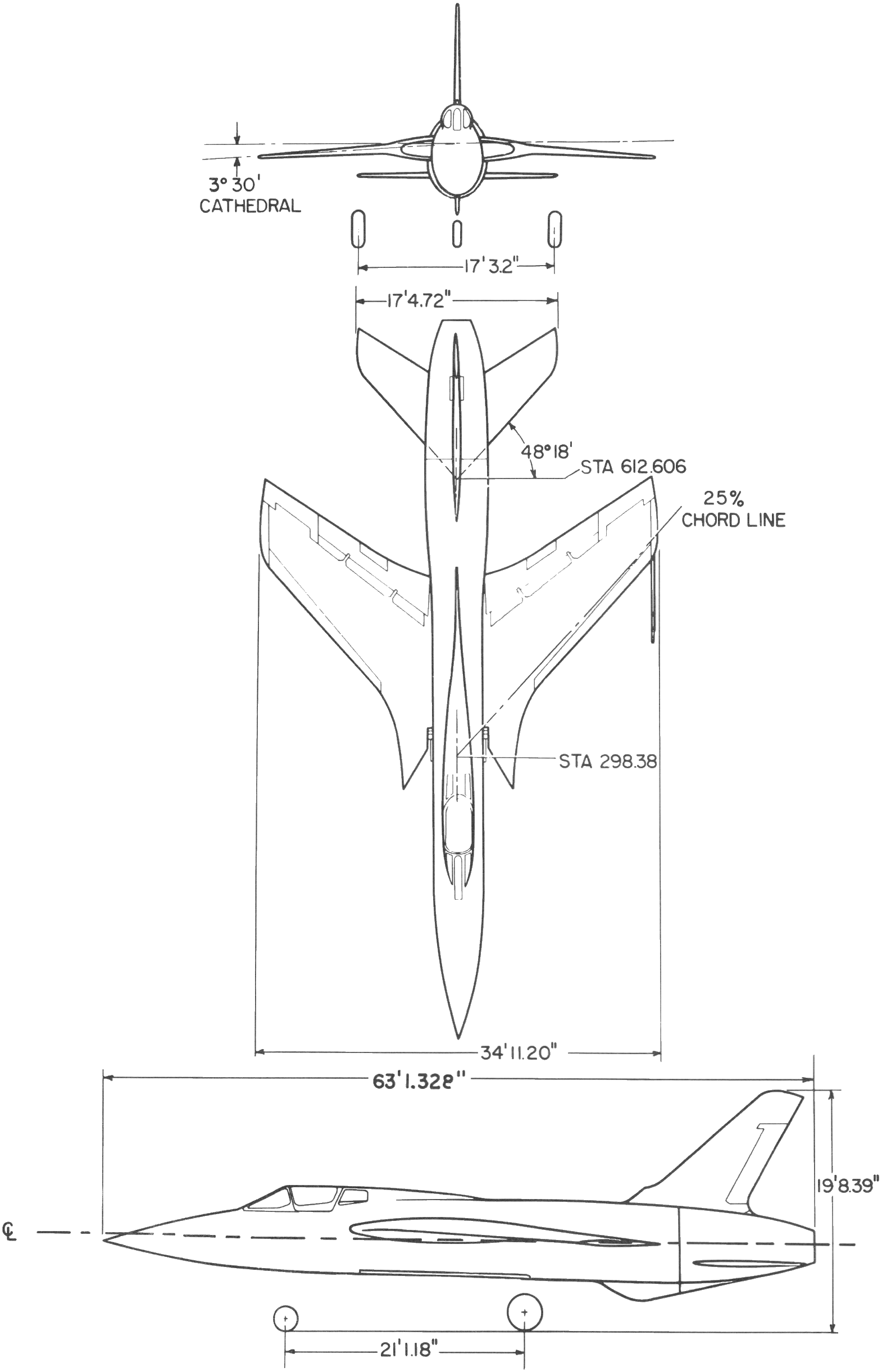
3-view line drawing of the Republic F-105B Thunderchief

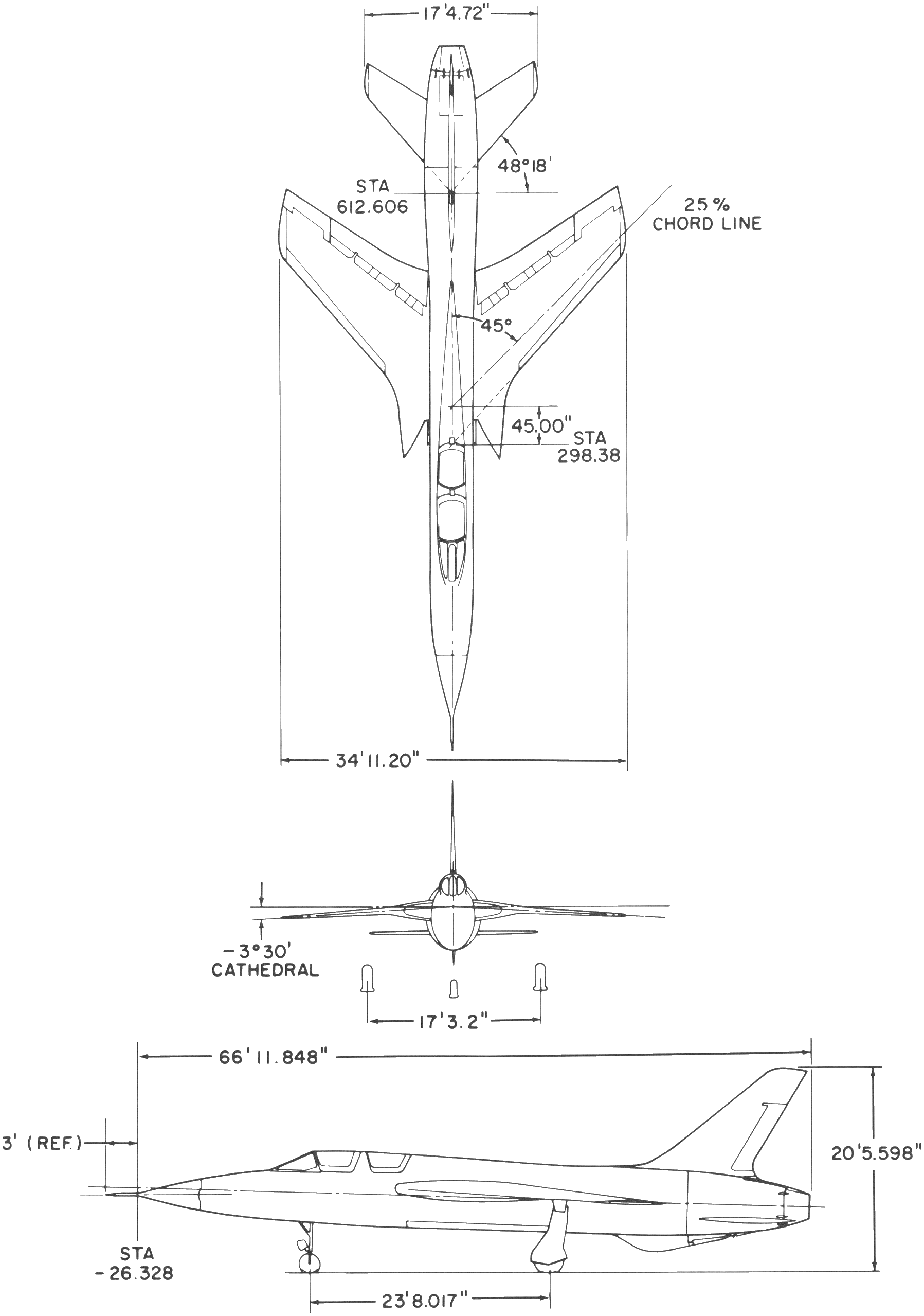
3-view line drawing of the Republic F-105F Thunderchief

Data from The Great Book of Fighters, Quest for Performance, U.S. Standard Aircraft Characteristics: F-105D-31, Jane's All the World's Aircraft 1969-70

General characteristics

- Crew: 1 (F-105F: 2)
- Length: 64 ft 4 3/4 in (19.628 m)
- Wingspan: 34 ft 11 1/4 in (10.649 m)
- Height: 19 ft 8 in (5.99 m)
- Wing area: 385 sq ft (35.8 m^{2})
- Aspect ratio: 3.18
- Airfoil: root: NACA 65A005.5; tip: NACA 65A003.7
- Empty weight: 26,855 lb (12,181 kg)
- Gross weight: 35,637 lb (16,165 kg)
- Max takeoff weight: 52,838 lb (23,967 kg)
- Fuel capacity: 770 US gal (640 imp gal; 2,900 L) in three flexible fuselage tanks + 390 US gal (320 imp gal; 1,500 L) weapon-bay tank, with provision for 1 × 650 US gal (540 imp gal; 2,500 L) or 750 US gal (620 imp gal; 2,800 L) centerline drop tank and 2 × 450 US gal (370 imp gal; 1,700 L) underwing drop tanks; Total maximum fuel 2,810 US gal (2,340 imp gal; 10,600 L)
- Zero-lift drag coefficient: C_{D} 0.0173
- Drag area: 6.65 sq ft (0.6 m^{2})
- Powerplant: 1 × Pratt & Whitney J75-P-19W afterburning turbojet engine, 14,300 lbf (64 kN) thrust 26,500 lbf (117.88 kN) with afterburning and water injection

Performance

- Maximum speed: 1,210 kn (1,390 mph, 2,240 km/h) / Mach 2.1 at 35,000 ft (11,000 m)
- Combat range: 676 nmi (778 mi, 1,252 km)
- Ferry range: 1,917 nmi (2,206 mi, 3,550 km)
- Service ceiling: 48,500 ft (14,800 m)
- Rate of climb: 38,500 ft/min (196 m/s)
- Time to altitude: 35,000 ft (11,000 m) in one minute and 42 seconds
- Lift-to-drag: 10.4
- Wing loading: 93 lb/sq ft (450 kg/m^{2})
- Thrust/weight: 0.74

Armament

- Guns: 1 × 20 mm (0.787 in) M61A1 Vulcan 6-barreled Gatling cannon, 1,028 rounds
- Hardpoints: 5 total: 4 × under-wing, 1 × centerline pylon stations plus an internal bomb bay with a capacity of up to 14,000 lb (6,400 kg) of ordnance, with provisions to carry combinations of:
  - Rockets:
    - LAU-32/LAU-59 rocket pods with 7 × FFARs each
  - Missiles:
    - AIM-9 Sidewinder air-to-air missiles
    - AGM-12 Bullpup air-to-surface missiles
    - AGM-45 Shrike anti-radiation missiles
  - Bombs:
    - M117 and Mark 80 series of general-purpose bombs
    - M118 demolition bombs
    - Nuclear weapons B28, B43 stored internally and B57, B61
    - Cluster munitions of various types, including CBU-24

Avionics

- NASARR R-14A radar
- AN/ASG-19 Thunderstick fire control system
- AN/ARN-85 LORAN (AN/ARN-92 in Thunderstick II-modified aircraft)

== Video resources ==
"Mach of the Thunderchief" Republic Aircraft Corporation promotional film.

"There Is A Way"' Official USAF promotional film reel.

F-105 Foreign-Object Damage (FOD) management USAF informational film reel

"F-105 Armament Capability and Spin Tests" Republic Aircraft Corporation promotional film.

"The Bombing of Hanoi" (1966). USAF information film reel.

Air-strikes & dogfights in Vietnam - USAF silent film reel.

== See also ==
- Century Series
- Thud Ridge
- León Ferrari § "Western and Christian Civilization" - Argentine artist who depicted Christ crucified on an F-105

Related development

- Republic F-84F Thunderstreak

Aircraft of comparable role, configuration, and era

- Blackburn Buccaneer
- Nanchang Q-5
- Sukhoi Su-7
- Sukhoi Su-17

Related lists

- List of fighter aircraft
- List of military aircraft of the United States
