= Thud Ridge =

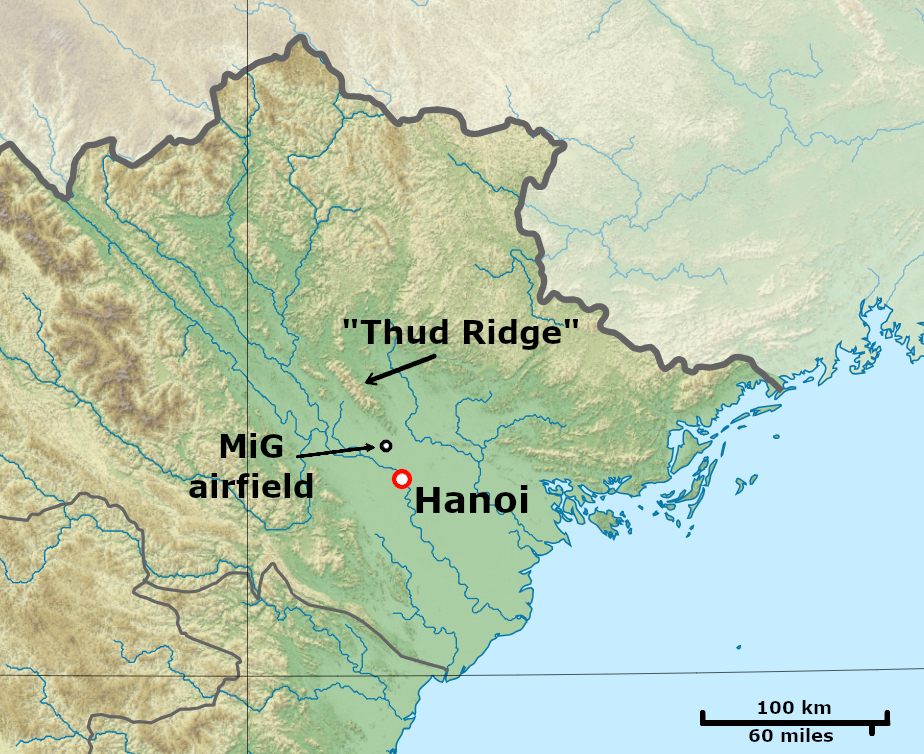
- Location of Thud Ridge
- Interactive map of Thud Ridge
- Elevation: 5,000 feet (1,500 m)

Third Approach
- Location: Vietnam
- Range: Tam Dao range
- Coordinates: 21°30′22.2″N 105°36′31.02″E

Thud Ridge was the nickname given by United States Air Force F-105 Thunderchief pilots (the aircraft being nicknamed "Thud") during the Vietnam War to the Tam Dao range a 24 km, 5,000 feet (1,500 m) high ridge that ran parallel to the Red River approximately 32 km northwest of Hanoi, which was both a waypoint during air attacks and a terrain masking feature for ingressing fighters in the vicinity of Hanoi, North Vietnam.

The North Vietnamese eventually installed anti-aircraft artillery on the ridge using heavy-lift helicopters.

Phúc Yên Air Base is located at the base of the ridge, while Kép Air Base is located east of the ridge.

The ridge features heavily in the book Thud Ridge.
