= Air Force Review Boards Agency =

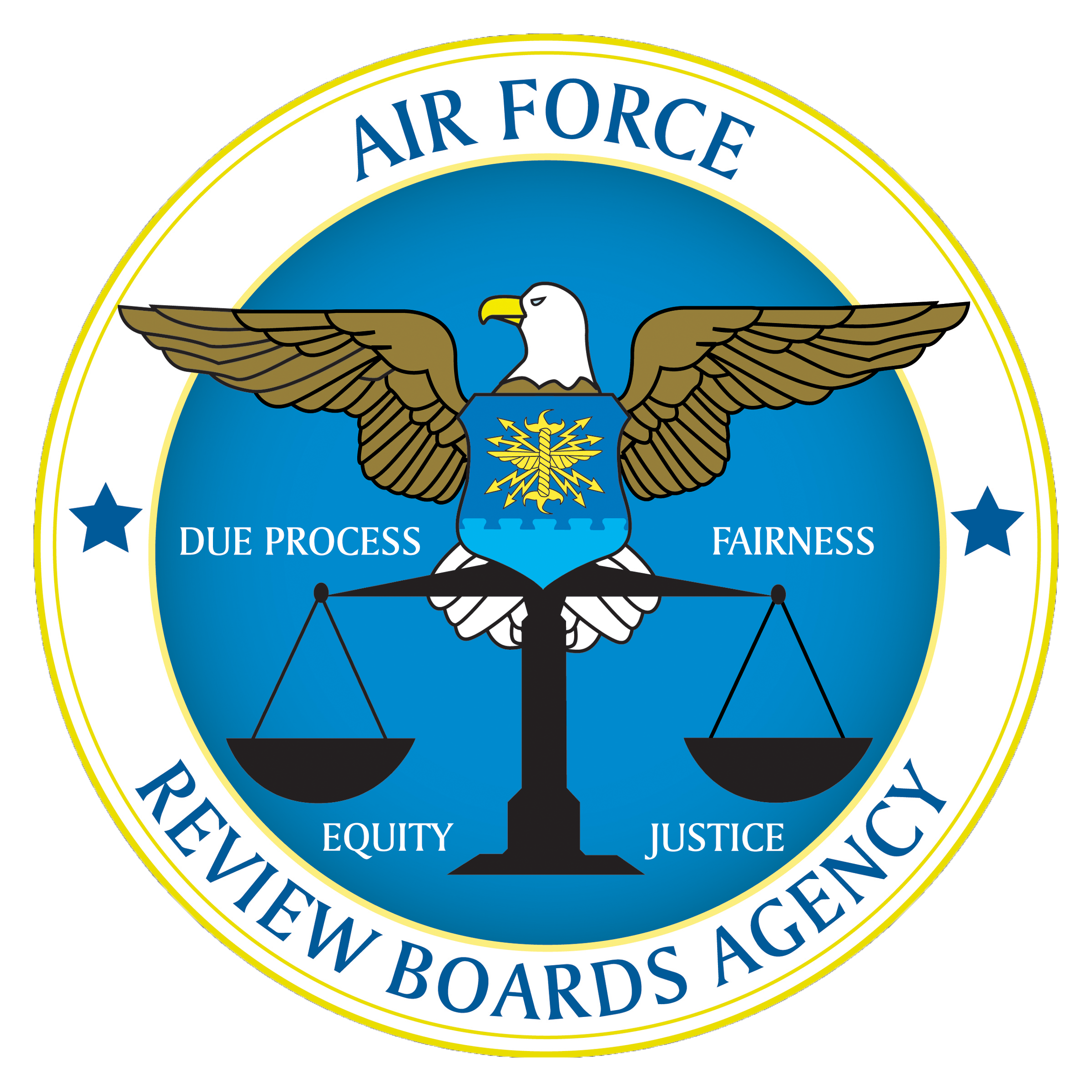
- Active: 1 September 1982 – present
- Country: United States
- Branch: United States Air Force
- Garrison/HQ: Joint Base Andrews

The Air Force Review Boards Agency (AFRBA) provides management of various military and civilian appellate processes for the secretary of the Air Force. It decides individual cases before the agency's five component directorates:

- Air Force Civilian Appellate Review Office (AFCARO)
- Air Force Board for Correction of Military Records (BCMR)
- DoD Physical Disability Board of Review (PDBR)
- Personnel Security Appeals Board (PSAB)
- Secretary of the Air Force Personnel Council (SAFPC)

The AFRBA falls under Manpower and Reserve Affairs with the office symbol SAF/MRB.

It renders final decisions for the secretary of the Air Force to correct errors or injustices in military and civilian records and ensures due process, equity and fair and impartial treatment for the Air Force military and civilian force.
