= Luna Sea discography =

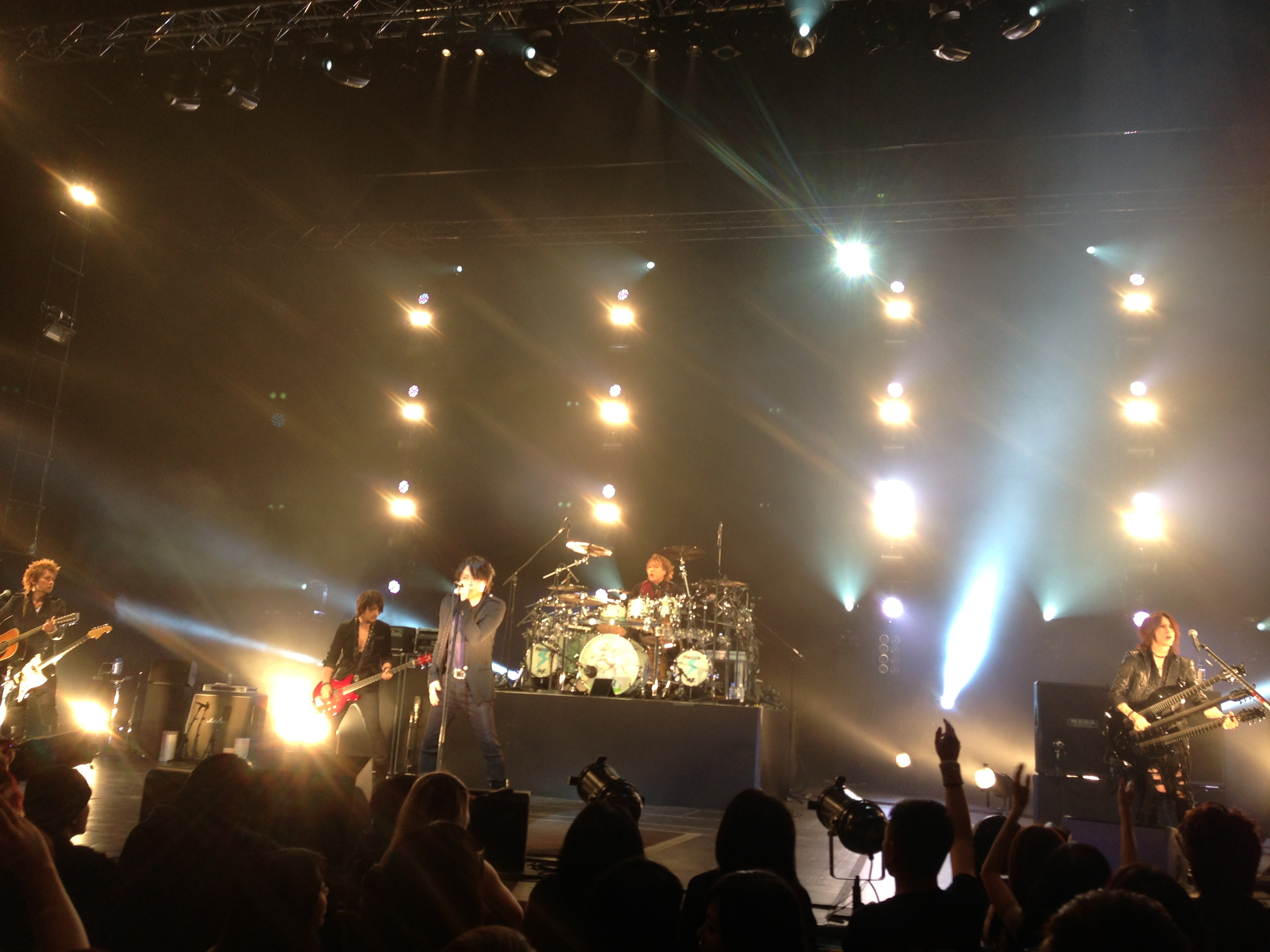
- Luna Sea in Singapore in 2013
- Studio albums: 10
- Live albums: 3
- Compilation albums: 9
- Tribute albums: 1
- Singles: 22
- Video albums: 48
- Remix: 10
- Self cover albums: 3
- Demos: 3
- Various artists compilations: 5

The discography of the Japanese rock band Luna Sea consists of 10 studio albums, 3 live albums, 3 self cover albums, 9 compilations (including 3 box sets), 10 instrumental remix albums, 22 singles, and 48 home videos.

The band was founded in 1986 by bassist J and rhythm guitarist Inoran, when they were in high school. In 1989 they recruited lead guitarist Sugizo, drummer Shinya and vocalist Ryuichi, a lineup that remained the same until Shinya's death from cancer in February 2026. Originally called Lunacy, the band changed their name to Luna Sea upon their first album release in 1991.

Due to their early use of make-up and costumes and their widespread popularity, Luna Sea are considered one of the most successful and influential bands in the visual kei movement. Throughout the mid '90s they used significantly less make-up, and after a one-year break in 1998, came back with a more mainstream alternative rock style and toned down their on-stage attire. When they disbanded in 2000, they left a big mark on the Japanese rock scene. In 2003, HMV ranked Luna Sea at number 90 on their list of the 100 most important Japanese pop acts. Luna Sea have sold over 10 million certified records in Japan.

Luna Sea achieved their breakthrough success with a sold-out tour in 1991, which helped them get a contract with MCA Victor, and with the release of their second album Image (1992), which peaked at number 9 on the Oricon chart. Following critically acclaimed albums Eden in 1993 (No. 5), Mother in 1994 (No. 2) and Style in 1996 (No. 1), the band switched to Universal in 1998 and released their best-selling studio album, the number one Shine. In late 2000, after their seventh studio album Lunacy (No. 3), Luna Sea disbanded. In 2007 and 2008 they reunited for one-date shows, and in 2010 officially restarted activities. Their first new studio album in thirteen years, A Will (No.3), was released in 2013. Their ninth album, Luv (No. 4), followed four years later in 2017. At the end of 2019, Cross peaked at number 3 on the Oricon, but became their first to top Billboard Japan.

== Albums ==
=== Studio albums ===
Year	Title (information)	Peak Position			Sales (Japan)	RIAJ certification (sales thresholds)
Year	Title (information)	Oricon	Billboard Japan	TWN	Sales (Japan)	RIAJ certification (sales thresholds)
1991	Luna Sea: Released: April 21, 1991; Label: Extasy	－	－	－	30,000+	－
1992	Image: Released: May 21, 1992; Label: MCA Victor	9	－	－	400,000	Platinum
1993	Eden: Released: April 21, 1993; Label: MCA Victor	5	－	－	400,000	Platinum
1994	Mother: Released: October 26, 1994; Label: MCA Victor	2	－	－	712,000	Platinum
1996	Style: Released: April 22, 1996; Label: MCA Victor	1	－	－	725,000	Platinum
1998	Shine: Released: July 23, 1998; Label: Universal	1	－	－	1,125,000	Million
2000	Lunacy: Released: July 12, 2000; Label: Universal	3	－	－	284,000	－
2013	A Will: Released: December 11, 2013; Label: Universal	3	3	－	－	－
2017	Luv: Released: December 20, 2017; Label: Universal	4	4	－	－	－
2019	Cross: Released: December 18, 2019; Label: Universal	3	1	1	－	－

=== Self cover albums ===
Year	Title (information)	Peak Position		Sales (Japan)	RIAJ certification (sales thresholds)
Year	Title (information)	Oricon	Billboard Japan	Sales (Japan)	RIAJ certification (sales thresholds)
2011	Luna Sea: Released: March 16, 2011; Label: HPQ/Avex	6	7	35,000	－
2023	Mother: Released: November 29, 2023; Label: Avex Trax	4	5	15,293	－
2023	Style: Released: November 29, 2023; Label: Avex Trax	6	6	14,942	－

=== Live albums ===
Year	Title (information)	Oricon		Sales (Japan)	RIAJ certification (sales thresholds)
Year	Title (information)	Weekly	Yearly	Sales (Japan)	RIAJ certification (sales thresholds)
1999	Never Sold Out: Released: May 29, 1999; Label: Universal	5	80	288,000	Gold
2011	Luna Sea 3D in Los Angeles: Released: December 4, 2010; Label: HPQ/Avex	15	－	6,000	－
2014	Never Sold Out 2: Released: May 28, 2014; Label: Universal	14	－	－	－

=== Compilation albums ===
Year	Title (information)	Oricon		Sales (Japan)	RIAJ certification (sales thresholds)
Year	Title (information)	Weekly	Yearly	Sales (Japan)	RIAJ certification (sales thresholds)
1997	Singles: Released: December 17, 1997; Label: Universal	1	20	1,236,000	Triple Platinum
2000	Period -the Best Selection-: Released: December 23, 2000; Label: Universal	1	53 (2001)	400,000	Platinum
2002	Another Side of Singles II: Released: March 6, 2002; Label: Universal	30	－	17,000	－
2003	Complete Single Box: Released: December 23, 2003; Label: Universal	－	－	－	－
2004	Complete Album Box: Released: May 29, 2004; Label: Universal	212	－	－	－
2005	Slow: Released: March 23, 2005; Label: Universal	63	－	8,000	－
2008	Complete Best: Released: March 26, 2008; Label: Universal	11	－	20,000	－
2013	Complete Best -Asia Limited Edition-: Released: March 27, 2013; Label: Avex Trax	47	－	－	－
2014	25th Anniversary Ultimate Best -The One-: Released: May 28, 2014; Label: Universal	17	－	－	－

=== Tribute album ===
Year	Title (information)	Oricon		Sales (Japan)	RIAJ certification (sales thresholds)
Year	Title (information)	Weekly	Yearly	Sales (Japan)	RIAJ certification (sales thresholds)
2007	Luna Sea Memorial Cover Album -Re:birth-: Released: December 19, 2007; Label: Avex Trax	33	－	－	－

=== Remix albums ===
Title	Release date	Label
Symphonic Luna Sea	June 22, 1994	Victor
Symphonic Luna Sea II	September 21, 1995	Victor
Guitar Solo Instruments 1	December 19, 2001	Universal
Guitar Solo Instruments 2	December 19, 2001	Universal
Piano Solo Instruments 1	December 19, 2001	Universal
Piano Solo Instruments 2	December 19, 2001	Universal
Piano Solo Instruments 3	December 19, 2001	Universal
Piano Solo Instruments 4	December 19, 2001	Universal
Symphonic Luna Sea -Reboot-	November 26, 2014	Nippon Columbia
Piano Anthology ~Melody of Luna Sea~	August 31, 2016	Being Inc.

== Singles ==
Year	Title (information)	Oricon		Billboard Japan Hot 100	Sales (Japan)	RIAJ certification (sales thresholds)	Album
Year	Title (information)	Weekly	Yearly	Billboard Japan Hot 100	Sales (Japan)	RIAJ certification (sales thresholds)	Album
1993	"Believe": Release: February 24, 1993; Label: MCA Victor	11	—	—	200,000	Gold	Eden
1993	"In My Dream (With Shiver)": Release: July 21, 1993; Label: MCA Victor	9	—	—	102,920	—	Eden
1994	"Rosier": Release: July 21, 1994; Label: MCA Victor	3	80	—	400,000	Platinum	Mother
1994	"True Blue": Release: September 21, 1994; Label: MCA Victor	1	65	—	420,490	Platinum	Mother
1995	"Mother": Release: February 22, 1995; Label: MCA Victor	5	—	—	243,290	—	Mother
1995	"Desire": Release: November 13, 1995; Label: MCA Victor	1	—	—	588,370	—	Style
1996	"End of Sorrow": Release: March 25, 1996; Label: MCA Victor	1	70	—	419,360	Platinum	Style
1996	"In Silence": Release: July 15, 1996; Label: MCA Victor	2	—	—	285,510	Gold	Style
1998	"Storm": Release: April 15, 1998; Label: Universal	1	29	—	720,370	Platinum	Shine
1998	"Shine": Release: June 3, 1998; Label: Universal	1	59	—	415,820	Platinum	Shine
1998	"I for You": Release: July 1, 1998; Label: Universal	2	49	—	481,390	Platinum	Shine
2000	"Gravity": Release: March 29, 2000; Label: Universal	1	—	—	282,720	Gold	Lunacy
2000	"Tonight": Release: May 17, 2000; Label: Universal	4	—	—	211,460	—	Lunacy
2000	"Love Song": Release: November 8, 2000; Label: Universal	4	—	—	178,980	—	
2012	"The One -Crash to Create-": Release: March 21, 2012; Label: HPQ/Avex	5	—	23	30,000	—	
2012	"The End of the Dream/Rouge": Release: December 12, 2012; Label: Universal	6	—	7	22,500	—	A Will
2013	"Thoughts": Release: August 28, 2013; Label: Universal	7	—	14	16,682	—	A Will
2013	"Ran" (乱; alternately "Run"): Release: November 13, 2013; Label: Universal	17	—	24	—	—	A Will
2016	"Limit": Release: June 22, 2016; Label: Universal	14	—	19	—	—	Luv
2019	"Sora no Uta ~Higher and Higher~/Hisōbi" (宇宙の詩 ～Higher and Higher～/悲壮美): Release: May 29, 2019; Label: Universal	7	—	20	14,754	—	Cross
2020	"The Beyond": Release: April 29, 2020 (limited); Label: Universal	1	—	—	6,000	—	Cross
2026	"Forever": Release: May 29, 2026; Label: Avex Trax	4	—	78	10,317	—	TBA

== Various artists compilations ==
Title	Song	Release date	Label
Nuclear Fusion Tour	"Precious"	March 10, 1991	Extasy
Mulan	"Breathe (Special Version)"	June 2, 1998	Walt Disney
Tribute Spirits	"Scanner"	May 1, 1999	Pony Canyon
The World Is Not Enough	"Sweetest Coma Again"	January 19, 2000	Radioactive/MCA
Another Heaven Complex - Score	"Gravity on the Edge of the World"	April 28, 2000	Universal

== Videos ==
Title	VHS release date	LD release date	DVD release date	Blu-ray release date	Label	Oricon DVD	Oricon Blu-ray
Image or Real	July 22, 1992	July 22, 1992	May 29, 2002	May 28, 2025	MCA Victor, Universal	46	－
Sin After Sin	December 16, 1993	December 16, 1993	May 29, 2002	May 28, 2025	MCA Victor, Universal	50	－
Eclipse I	May 24, 1995	May 24, 1995	－	－	MCA Victor	－	－
Lunatic Tokyo 1995.12.23 Tokyo Dome	July 15, 1996	July 15, 1996	May 29, 2002	May 28, 2025	MCA Victor, Universal	39	－
Rew	May 21, 1997	May 21, 1997	May 29, 2002	May 28, 2025	MCA Victor, Universal	44	－
10th Anniversary Gig [Never Sold Out] Capacity ∞ Live!	September 29, 1999	－	－	－	Universal	－	－
10th Anniversary Gig [Never Sold Out] Capacity ∞ Document!	September 29, 1999	－	－	－	Universal	－	－
Slave Gentei Gig 2000 (SLAVE限定GIG 2000)	August 2000 (fan club-exclusive)	－	October 12, 2005 (fan club-exclusive)	－	Sweet Child	－	－
The Final Act Tokyo Dome	April 2001 (fan club-exclusive)	－	May 29, 2001	－	Universal	5	－
Eclipse II	November 28, 2001	－	－	－	Universal	－	－
Eclipse I+II	－	－	November 28, 2001	－	Universal	11	－
Mafuyu no Yagai (真冬の野外) (Note: Previously released exclusively to fan club members on DVD in February 2004 as Un Ending Style Tour Final Christmas Stadium Mafuyu no Yagai (UN ENDING STYLE TOUR FINAL Christmas STADIUM 真冬の野外).)	－	－	January 16, 2008	－	Nayutawave	10	－
Manatsu no Yagai (真夏の野外) (Note: Previously released exclusively to fan club members on VHS and DVD in January 2003 as 1998 Revive Manatsu no Yagai (1998 REVIVE 真夏の野外).)	－	－	January 16, 2008	－	Nayutawave	13	－
God Bless You ~One Night Dejavu~ Tokyo Dome 2007.12.24	－	－	March 26, 2008	December 24, 2008	Avex Trax	3	－
10th Anniversary Gig [Never Sold Out] Capacity ∞ (Note: Contains both 1999 releases; Live! and Document!.)	－	－	May 30, 2010	－	Nayutawave	19	－
Mafuyu no Yagai/Manatsu no Yagai (真冬の野外/真夏の野外)	－	－	May 30, 2010	－	Nayutawave	90	－
First Asian Tour 1999 in Hong Kong	－	－	December 15, 2010	－	Sweet Child	36	－
Concert Tour 2000 Brand New Chaos Act II in Taipei	－	－	December 15, 2010	－	Sweet Child	32	－
A Documentary Film of 20th Anniversary World Tour Reboot -to the New Moon-	－	－	April 13, 2011	－	Avex Trax	10	－
20th Anniversary World Tour Reboot -to the New Moon- 24th December, 2010 at Tokyo Dome	－	－	April 13, 2011	April 13, 2011	Avex Trax	8	－
Lunacy Kurofuku Gentei Gig ~the Holy Night~ (LUNACY 黒服限定GIG 〜the Holy Night〜)	－	－	April 13, 2011	April 13, 2011	Avex Trax	9	－
God Bless You Document Ichiya Kagiri no Fukkatsu Live Luna Sea Chinmoku no 7 Nen wo Koete (GOD BLESS YOU DOCUMENT 一夜限りの復活ライブ LUNA SEA沈黙の7年を超えて)	－	－	October 19, 2011	June 20, 2012	Avex Trax	13	85
Luna Sea 3D in Los Angeles	－	－	February 22, 2012	February 22, 2012	Avex Trax	67	48
Luna Sea For Japan A Promise to the Brave	－	－	March 28, 2012	March 28, 2012	Avex Trax	24	12
First Asian Tour 1999 in Hong Kong/Concert Tour 2000 Brand New Chaos Act II in Taipei	－	－	May 30, 2012	－	Universal	－	－
Concert Tour 2000 Brand New Chaos ~20000803 Osaka-jō Hall~ (CONCERT TOUR 2000 BRAND NEW CHAOS 〜20000803 大阪城ホール〜)	－	－	December 19, 2012	－	Sweet Child	62	－
The End of the Dream -Prologue-	－	－	March 27, 2013	March 27, 2013	Avex Trax	77	51
The End of the Dream Zepp Tour 2012 "Kourin" (The End of the Dream ZEPP TOUR 2012 「降臨」)	－	－	March 27, 2013	April 24, 2013	Avex Trax	26	45
Live Tour 2012–2013 The End of the Dream at Nippon Budokan (LIVE TOUR 2012-2013 The End of the Dream at 日本武道館)	－	－	May 29, 2013	June 26, 2013	Universal	10	41
Slave Gentei Gig 2013 Ryōgoku Kokugikan (SLAVE限定GIG 2013 両国国技館)	－	－	May 2, 2014 (fan club-exclusive)	－	Luna Sea Inc.	－	－
Live on A Will	－	－	June 24, 2015	July 22, 2015	Universal	11	64
The Anniversary 2018 The Luv -World Left Behind- Final	－	－	February 27, 2019 (fan club-exclusive)	February 27, 2019 (fan club-exclusive)	Luna Sea Inc.	－	－
Lunatic X'mas 2018 -Introduction to the 30th Anniversary-	－	－	December 23, 2020 (fan club-exclusive)	December 23, 2020 (fan club-exclusive)	Luna Sea Inc.	－	－
Reload 2021.3.28 Saitama Super Arena	－	－	－	January 8, 2022 (venue-exclusive)	Luna Sea Inc.	－	－
Fukkatsusai -A New Voice- Nippon Budokan 2022.8.26 Day 1 [Silky Voice] (復活祭 -A NEW VOICE- 日本武道館 2022.8.26 Day1 [Silky Voice])	－	－	－	March 14, 2023	Universal	－	16
Fukkatsusai -A New Voice- Nippon Budokan 2022.8.27 Day 2 [Naked Voice] (復活祭 -A NEW VOICE- 日本武道館 2022.8.27 Day2 [Naked Voice])	－	－	－	March 14, 2023	Universal	－	18
Dual Arena Tour 2023 Mother of Love, Mother of Hate	－	－	－	February 26, 2025	Avex Trax	－	－
Dual Arena Tour 2023 Un Ending Style	－	－	－	February 26, 2025	Avex Trax	－	－
Dual Arena Tour 2023 Mother of Love, Mother of Hate Un Ending Style	－	－	－	February 26, 2025	Avex Trax	－	7
35th Anniversary Tour 2024 Era to Era Image or Real	－	－	－	March 12, 2025	Avex Trax	－	－
35th Anniversary Tour 2024 Era to Era Search for My Eden	－	－	－	March 12, 2025	Avex Trax	－	－
35th Anniversary Tour 2024 Era to Era Image or Real Search for My Eden	－	－	－	March 12, 2025	Avex Trax	－	9
35th Anniversary Tour 2024 Era to Era Shining Brightly	－	－	－	March 26, 2025	Avex Trax	－	－
35th Anniversary Tour 2024 Era to Era Brand New Chaos	－	－	－	March 26, 2025	Avex Trax	－	－
35th Anniversary Tour 2024 Era to Era Shining Brightly Brand New Chaos	－	－	－	March 26, 2025	Avex Trax	－	－
35th Anniversary Live Blu-ray 1992–1996 Special Box	－	－	－	May 28, 2025	Universal	－	－
35th Anniversary Tour Era to Era -The Final Episode- Lunatic Tokyo 2025 -Kurofuku Gentei Gig- (35th ANNIVERSARY TOUR ERA TO ERA -THE FINAL EPISODE- LUNATIC TOKYO 2025 -黒服限定GIG-)	－	－	February 25, 2026	February 25, 2026	Avex Trax	3	8
The Millennium Eve 2025	－	－	May 27, 2026	May 27, 2026	Millennium	3	3

== Demos ==
Title	Release date	Notes
"Lunacy"	August 9, 1989	Songs: "Kill Me", "Sexual Parvarsion" and "Nightmare". Track 2 was reworked and retitled "Time is Dead" for their debut album, Luna Sea.
"Shade"	December 8, 1989, March 16, 2011	Songs: "Shade", "Search for Reason" and "Suspicious". Track 1 was re-recorded for their first album, and track 2 for their second, Image. The whole demo was re-released in the premium edition of the self cover of their debut album.
"Lastly"	June 10, 1990	Composed only of the title track, which was re-recorded for their 1993 album Eden.

== Other ==
- Aionism – Aion (October 8, 1991)

Luna Sea members provide backing vocals on several songs.

- Unrivaled is Extasy ~ Extasy Summit '91 at Nippon Budokan (February 21, 1992)

Live recordings of a 1991 Extasy Summit, held by Extasy Records. Also features Tokyo Yankees, Virus, X Japan and several others.

- Minna ga Mumei-Datta, Dakedo... Muteki-Datta ~ Extasy Summit 1992, May 10, 1993, Extasy

Live recordings of the October 31, 1992 Extasy Summit, held by Extasy Records. Also features Deep, Media Youth, The Zolge, Tokyo Yankees, Screaming Mad George and Psychosis, Gilles de Rais, Zi:Kill and several others.

- Out – Nav Katze (March 24, 1994)

All Luna Sea members play on "Arabia no Yoru" (アラビアの夜).

- "Rosier (Live Version)" (1994)

Won through a magazine contest.

- "Promise" (April 9, 2011)

A digital download song recorded and released specifically for the proceeds to be donated for recovery and relief from the 2011 Tōhoku earthquake and tsunami. Later included on the 2014 compilation album 25th Anniversary Ultimate Best -The One-.

- "Holy Knight" (December 23, 2016)

Limited Christmas song CD sold only at The Holy Night -Beyond the Limit- concerts at Saitama Super Arena on December 23 and 24, 2016.

- "Beyond the Time ~Moebius no Sora o Koete~" (BEYOND THE TIME ～メビウスの宇宙を超えて～; "Beyond the Time (Over the Moebius Skies)", September 6, 2019)

Cover of the TM Network song for use as the third opening theme of the 2019 Mobile Suit Gundam: The Origin - Advent of the Red Comet anime. Released digitally on September 6, 2019, it peaked at number 79 on the Japan Hot 100, but reached number 15 on the Hot Animation chart, which tracks anime and video game music. The song was later included in the limited edition B version of their album Cross.

- "Make a Vow" (April 28, 2020)

A song created remotely within two weeks as an answer to the COVID-19 pandemic in Japan. Released digitally for free alongside a music video also created remotely, although fan club members received the song earlier.

- Extasy Visual Shock (March 31, 2022)

Visual kei-themed rhythm game for iOS and Android. Featured Luna Sea songs and video footage. Also featured X Japan and Glay. Service ended on October 31, 2022, after only seven months.
