= Luna Sea 3D in Los Angeles =

Live album by Luna Sea
- Released: June 1, 2011
- Recorded: December 4, 2010
- Venues: Hollywood Palladium, Hollywood, California
- Genres: Progressive rock, alternative rock
- Label: HPQ/Avex
- Producer: Luna Sea

Luna Sea 3D in Los Angeles
- Directed by: Sojiro Otsubo
- Produced by: Sony
- Starring: Ryuichi; Sugizo; Inoran; J Shinya
- Cinematography: Peter Anderson
- Music by: Luna Sea
- Distributed by: Sony PLC
- Release date: May 29, 2011 (premiere)
- Running time: 104 minutes
- Country: Japan

Luna Sea 3D in Los Angeles

Video by Luna Sea
- Released: February 22, 2012
- Recorded: December 4, 2010
- Venues: Hollywood Palladium, Hollywood, California
- Genres: Progressive rock, alternative rock
- Label: Avex
- Director: Sojiro Otsubo

Luna Sea chronology
| Ichiya Kagiri no Fukkatsu Live Luna Sea Chinmoku no 7 Nen wo Koete (2011) | Luna Sea 3D in Los Angeles (2012) | Luna Sea For Japan A Promise to the Brave (2012) |

Luna Sea 3D in Los Angeles is a live album, 3D concert film and home video by Japanese rock band Luna Sea. It was recorded and filmed at the Hollywood Palladium in the United States on December 4, 2010, as part of their 20th Anniversary World Tour Reboot -to the New Moon-. The live album was released on June 1, 2011, while the film began showing in theaters nationwide on June 4, 2011 and was released on home video on February 22, 2012. The album reached number 15 on the Oricon Albums Chart, the Blu-ray reached number 48 on Oricon's Blu-ray chart, and the DVD version peaked at number 67.

== Recording and release ==
Luna Sea 3D in Los Angeles was filmed in 3-D at the Hollywood Palladium in Hollywood, California on December 4, 2010. The concert was the second date of the band's first world tour, 20th Anniversary World Tour Reboot -to the New Moon-, and marked their first ever concert in the United States. Having reunited earlier that year after disbanding in 2000, the tour was also their first in ten years.

The film had its premiere at Toho Cinemas Roppongi Hills on May 29, 2011 and entered Japanese theaters nationwide on June 4. The live album, their first since Never Sold Out 12 years earlier, was released on June 1, 2011. The album reached number 15 on the Oricon Albums Chart and charted for three weeks. The film was later released on DVD, Blu-ray and 3D Blu-ray on February 22, 2012. The Blu-ray version reached number 48 on Oricon's Blu-ray chart, while the DVD version peaked at number 67 on Oricon's DVD chart.

The songs "Face to Face", "Fate" and "In My Dream (With Shiver)" and the bass and drum solos performed at the concert are not included on any release. The performance of "Gravity" is included on the album, but not in the film.

== Live album track listing ==
All tracks are written by Luna Sea.

Disc 1
| No. | Title | Length |
|---|---|---|
| 1. | "Gekkou -Opening SE-" (月光-Opening SE) | 1:59 |
| 2. | "Loveless" | 5:53 |
| 3. | "Déjàvu" | 5:18 |
| 4. | "Slave" | 3:40 |
| 5. | "End of Sorrow" | 4:28 |
| 6. | "True Blue" | 3:53 |
| 7. | "Gravity" (bonus track not included in the film) | 5:48 |
| 8. | "Ra-Se-N" | 7:16 |
| 9. | "Providence" | 6:17 |
| 10. | "Genesis of Mind ~Yume no Kanata e~" (GENESIS OF MIND〜夢の彼方へ〜) | 9:07 |

Disc 2
| No. | Title | Length |
|---|---|---|
| 1. | "Storm" | 5:02 |
| 2. | "Desire" | 4:26 |
| 3. | "Time is Dead" | 5:30 |
| 4. | "Rosier" | 5:59 |
| 5. | "Tonight" | 5:09 |
| 6. | "I for You" | 6:25 |
| 7. | "Wish" | 6:57 |
