= Period -the Best Selection- =

Compilation album by Luna Sea
- Released: December 23, 2000
- Genre: Rock
- Length: 75:19
- Label: Universal
- Producer: Luna Sea

Luna Sea chronology
Never Sold Out (1999)	Period -the Best Selection- (2000)	Guitar Solo Instruments 1 (2001)

Period -the Best Selection- is a compilation album by Japanese rock band Luna Sea, released on December 23, 2000, prior to their "Final Act" concerts. All tracks were remastered from their original versions, and tracks 11–13 and 15 were re-recorded just for this release. The album became the band's fourth number one on the Oricon Albums Chart, and charted for nine weeks. In 2001, it was certified Platinum by the RIAJ for sales over 400,000.

== Track listing ==
All music is composed by Luna Sea.

No.	Title	Length
1.	"Love Song" (2000)	7:14
2.	"Storm" (1998)	5:10
3.	"Gravity" (2000)	5:38
4.	"Tonight" (2000)	3:05
5.	"End of Sorrow" (1996)	4:23
6.	"Rosier" (1994)	5:25
7.	"True Blue" (1994)	3:46
8.	"Shine" (1998)	4:44
9.	"I for You" (1998)	5:33
10.	"Loveless" (1994, from Mother)	5:38
11.	"Believe" (1993)	4:08
12.	"Déjàvu" (1992, from Image)	4:38
13.	"Precious..." (1991, from Luna Sea)	4:25
14.	"In Silence" (1996)	5:38
15.	"Wish" (1992, from Image)	5:53
