= Rosier (song) =

Single by Luna Sea

from the album Mother
- B-side: "Rain"
- Released: July 21, 1994
- Genre: Hard rock, alternative rock
- Length: 10:58
- Label: MCA Victor
- Songwriter: Luna Sea
- Producer: Luna Sea

Luna Sea singles chronology
| "In My Dream (With Shiver)" (1993) | "Rosier" (1994) | "True Blue" (1994) |

Music video
- "Rosier" on YouTube

"Rosier" is the third single by Japanese rock band Luna Sea, released by MCA Victor on July 21, 1994. It is the first single from their fourth studio album, Mother. The song reached number 3 on the Oricon Singles Chart and was certified Platinum by the RIAJ for sales over 400,000. Its music video won Best Music Video at the 36th Japan Record Awards. It has been called the band's signature song, as well as a song symbolic of the visual kei movement.

== Composition ==
"Rosier" was written by bassist J. During the creation of Luna Sea's 1993 album Eden, he experienced a personal crisis as a musician that took him to the point where suicide entered his mind. He asked the other members for a break and visited a neurologist, where he reflected back on his life. J said he then chose to live as a vagabond in the park near his house, sleeping on a bench, before going to London, where a guitar riff entered his head as he lay in Hyde Park. By the time he returned to Japan, "Rosier" was complete. He said it was the first song he wrote for himself, previously he wrote songs in order to have them praised by others. The lyrics came easily during a training camp for Eden, and J said he decided to make the song a suicide note to the earlier version of himself, so he wrote the English lyrics in the middle of the song. He also performs these fast spoken English words on the recording and in live performances. As a staple of Luna Sea concerts, he throws his mic stand over his head and behind his back after finishing the vocal part.

Guitarist Sugizo cited "Rosier" as one of the songs wherein he tried to replicate the "psychedelic feel" of shoegaze bands by using effects, "like playing fast with a wah-wah pedal, or using tape-echo and harmonizers. I couldn't figure out how they did it, so I just made it into my own thing."

The single version of "Rosier" is slightly different from the one featured on Mother. The former ends with the song fading out, while the album version ends with lead vocalist Ryuichi saying the English phrase "I am the trigger". With the exception of Singles, every compilation album released by the band includes the album version. An 8 cm CD of a live version of "Rosier" was given away to winners of a magazine contest. Live versions also appear on the band's Never Sold Out and Never Sold Out 2 albums.

== Cover artwork ==
Like most of Luna Sea's releases, the artwork to the "Rosier" single was designed by Ken Sakaguchi. He came up with the idea of using a coffin and roses while listening to the song. The packaging was special in that it included a plastic case that housed the mini CD single. Sakaguchi claims this was the first time this had been done with that CD format. Afterwards, Sakaguchi used the coffin as a table in his living room, until it was displayed at the Luna Sea Museum.

== Music video ==
The music video for "Rosier" opens with the camera spiraling down on to a coffin, similar to cover art, with roses on it covering the glass window at its head. The majority shows the band performing the song against a white backdrop with smoke flowing along the ground. Black and white and light blue filters were also used, as was slow motion. A dominant feature is the camera work; a crane takes the viewer over the band 180 degrees from the front of its members, ending upside down at their backs, the opposite is also seen. 360 degree shots around the band are also shown.

Close-ups of the band members against a dark backdrop, separated from the camera by fluorescent lights, which provide the shots' only light, are inter-cut. During J's vocal part, the English lyrics appear flashing over the video in a typed font. The audio fades out while the video climaxes with a shot zooming in to the coffin's supposed glass window and a hand reaches out grabbing the camera. As the single version of the song, the audio does not end with the English phrase "I am the trigger", but the phrase is viewable in the video as it is written in red on the white drumhead of Shinya's snare drum.

== Reception ==
"Rosier" reached number 3 on the Oricon Singles Chart, and charted for 25 weeks. In 1998, it was certified Platinum by the RIAJ for sales over 400,000. The music video for "Rosier" won Best Music Video at the 36th Japan Record Awards. In a 2021 poll conducted by Net Lab of 4,805 people on their favorite Luna Sea song, "Rosier" came in first place with 945 votes. To commemorate the 70th anniversary of Hadano, Kanagawa, the hometown of four of Luna Sea's members, the Odakyu Electric Railway began using "Rosier" as the inbound train melody at Hadano Station in November 2025.

Music journalist Showgun Fuyu called "Rosier" a flawless song that has become a symbol of the visual kei movement. He wrote that with "ephemeral lyrics, a worldview of decadent beauty, and a wailing minor melody", the song also features a thrilling arrangement that brings the band together to create a catchy sound.

== Track listing ==
All tracks written and arranged by Luna Sea.

| No. | Title | Length |
|---|---|---|
| 1. | "Rosier" | 5:25 |
| 2. | "Rain" | 5:32 |

== Personnel ==
Luna Sea

- Ryuichi – vocals
- Sugizo – guitar
- Inoran – guitar
- J – bass
- Shinya – drums

Production

- Hitoshi Hiruma – recording and mixing

== Covers ==
"Rosier" was covered by High and Mighty Color on 2007's Luna Sea Memorial Cover Album -Re:birth-, and later included on their album Rock Pit.

It was also covered by defspiral for Crush! 3 - 90's V-Rock Best Hit Cover Love Songs-, which was released on June 27, 2012 and features current visual kei bands covering love songs by visual kei bands of the 90's.

Pop singer Tomomi Kahala recorded a version for her 2014 Memories 2 -Kahara All Time Covers- album.

Female heavy metal band Show-Ya released a version of the song for their 2014 cover album Glamorous Show ~ Japanese Legendary Rock Covers.

Fantôme Iris, a fictional visual kei band from the multimedia franchise Argonavis from BanG Dream! covered the song in 2021 at their first solo live.
