= Mother (Luna Sea song) =

Single by Luna Sea

from the album Mother
- B-side: "Déjàvu (Live Version)"
- Released: February 22, 1995
- Genre: Gothic rock, progressive rock
- Length: 9:29
- Label: MCA Victor
- Songwriter: Luna Sea
- Producer: Luna Sea

Luna Sea singles chronology
"True Blue" (1994)	"Mother" (1995)	"Desire" (1995)

Music video
- "Mother" on YouTube

"Mother" is the fifth single by Japanese rock band Luna Sea, released by MCA Victor on February 22, 1995. It reached number 5 on the Oricon Singles Chart, and charted for eight weeks.

== Overview ==
This version of the title track is slightly different from the one on the album, Mother. A music video for the song was filmed in Ireland. The B-side is a live version of "Déjàvu" recorded on December 27, 1994, at the Nippon Budokan.

== Track listing ==
All tracks written and arranged by Luna Sea.

No.	Title	Length
1.	"Mother"	5:35
2.	"Déjàvu (Live Version)"	3:54

== Personnel ==
Luna Sea

- Ryuichi – vocals
- Sugizo – guitar, violin
- Inoran – guitar
- J – bass
- Shinya – drums

Production

- Hitoshi Hiruma – recording and mixing on track 1
- Atsuo Akabae– recording and mixing on track 2
