= Mother (Luna Sea album) =

1994 album by Japanese rock band Luna Sea

Studio album by Luna Sea
- Released: October 26, 1994
- Studios: Sound Sky Kawana; Sound Sky Studio; Heart Beat
- Genres: Punk rock; progressive rock
- Length: 48:40
- Label: MCA Victor
- Producer: Luna Sea

Luna Sea chronology
Eden (1993)	Mother (1994)	Style (1996)

Singles from Mother
- 1. "Rosier" Released: July 21, 1994; 2. "True Blue" Released: September 21, 1994; 3. "Mother" Released: February 22, 1995

Mother is the fourth studio album by Japanese rock band Luna Sea, released on October 26, 1994. It reached number two on the Oricon Albums Chart and was certified Platinum by the RIAJ for sales over 400,000. According to J, its success changed everything for the band. Luna Sea re-recorded the entire album and released it on November 29, 2023, through Avex Trax.

== Overview ==
Guitarist Sugizo speaks German on the opening track "Loveless"; he counts "eins zwei drei vier" ("one, two, three, four") at several parts throughout the song, and says "Du bist Lieblos" ("You are loveless") at its end.

Sugizo cited "Rosier" as one of the songs wherein he tried to replicate the "psychedelic feel of shoegaze bands" by using effects, "like playing fast with a wah-wah pedal, or using tape-echo and harmonizers. I couldn’t figure out how they did it, so I just made it into my own thing."

Vocalist Ryuichi wrote the lyrics to "Genesis of Mind ~Yume no Kanata e~" about a close friend who died. Inoran used his father's classical guitar to record the middle part of the song.

The single versions of "Rosier" and "Mother" are slightly different from the album's. The album was remastered and re-released by Universal Music Group on December 5, 2007, it came with a DVD of the promotional videos for "Rosier", "True Blue" and "Mother". This version reached number 195 on the Oricon chart.

Mother and the band's other seven major label studio albums, up to Luv, were released on vinyl record for the first time on May 29, 2019.

== Reception ==
Mother reached number two on the Oricon Albums Chart, and charted for 30 weeks. In 1994, it was certified Platinum by the RIAJ for sales over 400,000. The album was named one of the top albums from 1989 to 1998 in a 2004 issue of the music magazine Band Yarouze and number 49 on Bounce's 2009 list of 54 Standard Japanese Rock Albums. In 2021, Jamie Cansdale of Kerrang! included Mother on a list of 13 essential Japanese rock and metal albums. Calling it Luna Sea's magnum opus, he wrote that it achieved "huge success by blending the gothic romanticism of albums past with radiant vibrancy." AllMusic's Alexey Eremenko called the album one of the band's best, along with 1998's Shine.

Music writer Takuya Ito wrote that, although each song on Mother is unique, they share a mysterious sense of unity that enhances each other's presence, while also containing mass appeal, thereby making the album a treasure not only within the visual kei scene, but within all of Japanese music. Noting it to contain the frenzied tones that were absent from their previous album Eden, Ito said the imagination and creativity that Luna Sea have had since their early days explodes on Mother. He described "Face to Face" as delving into gothic and industrial music, "Aurora" to be bathed in graceful melodies in an extension of Eden, and "In Future" as racing forward with punkish impulse, while incorporating digital effects.

== Covers ==
"Rosier" was covered by High and Mighty Color for the 2007 Luna Sea Memorial Cover Album -Re:birth-. It was later included on their 2008 album Rock Pit. It was also covered by defspiral for Crush! 3 - 90's V-Rock Best Hit Cover Love Songs-, which was released on June 27, 2012, and features current visual kei bands covering love songs by visual kei bands of the 90's. Fantôme Iris, a fictional visual kei band from multimedia franchise Argonavis from BanG Dream! covered the song on their first solo live Fantôme Iris 1st LIVE -C'est la vie!-.

== Track listing ==
All tracks are written by Luna Sea.

No.	Title	Length
1.	"Loveless" (Originally composed by Sugizo.)	5:36
2.	"Rosier" (Originally composed by J.)	5:25
3.	"Face to Face" (Originally composed by Inoran.)	4:45
4.	"Civilize" (Originally composed by Sugizo.)	3:25
5.	"Genesis of Mind ~Yume no Kanata e~ (GENESIS OF MIND ～夢の彼方へ～; 'Genesis of Mind ~Beyond the Dream~')" (Originally composed by Sugizo.)	8:12
6.	"Aurora" (Originally composed by Sugizo.)	4:44
7.	"In Future" (Originally composed by J.)	4:16
8.	"Fake" (Originally composed by Inoran.)	3:12
9.	"True Blue" (Originally composed by J.)	3:47
10.	"Mother" (Originally composed by Inoran.)	5:18
Total length:		48:40

== Personnel ==
Luna Sea

- Ryuichi – vocals
- Sugizo – guitar, violin
- Inoran – guitar
- J – bass
- Shinya – drums, percussion

Other

- Gloria – chorus
- Nadia Gifford – chorus
- Daisuke Kikuchi – programming

== Charts ==
=== Weekly charts ===
Chart (1994)	Peak position
Japanese Albums (Oricon)	2

=== Year-end charts ===
Chart (1994)	Position
Japanese Albums (Oricon)	32
Chart (1995)	Position
Japanese Albums (Oricon)	92

== Certifications ==
Region	Certification	Certified units/sales
Japan (RIAJ)	Platinum	400,000^{^}
^{^} Shipments figures based on certification alone.

== 2023 re-recording ==
Mother

Studio album by Luna Sea
- Released: November 29, 2023
- Studios: Sound Dali; Sound Crew; Kamome; King Sekiguchidai; Art Terror; Dino; The World Is Yours
- Genre: Progressive rock
- Length: 51:08
- Label: Avex Trax
- Producer: Luna Sea

Luna Sea chronology
Cross (2019)	Mother; Style (2023)

In 2023, Luna Sea re-recorded the entirety of Mother and Style (1996) and released them simultaneously on November 29 through Avex Trax. Guitarist Inoran said that after their December 22–23, 2018 concerts, where the band recreated setlists from the tours for Image (1992) and Eden (1993), they wanted to do the same for Mother. Feeling it would be fun to do it as a tour, they decided to make it a dual tour with Style, and then felt it would be even more fun if it was tied to albums. Although there were no major re-arrangements done to the songs, Inoran said it depended on the composer of the original song. In his compositions, he slightly changed the synchronized parts and phrases but noted it might be hard to notice these small details. He also opined that J did not change his songs much, but Sugizo's alterations depended on each song. Singer Denda Mao provides the female chorus on the songs "Face to Face" and "Mother". Pleased with the work he did producing their 2019 album Cross, Luna Sea asked Steve Lillywhite to mix the re-recorded albums.

=== Track listing ===
2023 Re-recording
No.	Title	Length
1.	"Loveless"	5:40
2.	"Rosier"	5:32
3.	"Face to Face"	4:47
4.	"Civilize"	3:25
5.	"Genesis of Mind ~Yume no Kanata e~ (GENESIS OF MIND ～夢の彼方へ～; 'Genesis of Mind ~Beyond the Dream~')"	8:49
6.	"Aurora"	5:13
7.	"In Future"	4:11
8.	"Fake"	3:29
9.	"True Blue"	4:07
10.	"Mother"	5:58
Total length:		51:08

=== Personnel ===
Luna Sea

- Ryuichi – vocals
- Sugizo – guitar, violin
- Inoran – guitar
- J – bass
- Shinya – drums

Other

- Yumi Kawamura – female chorus on "Rosier", "Aurora", "In Future", "Fake", "True Blue" and "Mother"
- Denda Mao – female chorus on "Face to Face" and "Mother"
- Daisuke "d-kiku" Kikuchi – sound effects and programming
- Hiroaki Hayama – string arrangement and copyist on "Mother"
- Yui Strings – strings on "Mother"

Production

- Steve Lillywhite – mixing
- Kelana Halim – additional mixing
- Howie Weinberg – mastering
- Manabu Matsumura – additional mastering

=== Charts ===
Chart (2023)	Peak position
Japanese Albums (Oricon)	4
