= Eden (Luna Sea album) =

1993 studio album by Luna Sea

Studio album by Luna Sea
- Released: April 21, 1993
- Genres: Punk rock; progressive rock
- Length: 47:42
- Label: MCA Victor
- Producer: Luna Sea

Luna Sea chronology
Image (1992)	Eden (1993)	Mother (1994)

Singles from Eden
- 1. "Believe" Released: February 24, 1993; 2. "In My Dream (With Shiver)" Released: July 21, 1993

Eden is the third album by the Japanese rock band Luna Sea, released on April 21, 1993. It reached number 5 on the Oricon Albums Chart, and charted for 19 weeks. In 2000, it was certified Platinum by the RIAJ for sales over 400,000.

== Overview ==
To support the album Luna Sea embarked on the fourteen-date Search For My Eden tour, followed by its four-date encore tour which ended with them headlining the Nippon Budokan.

The album versions of "Believe" and "In My Dream (With Shiver)" are slightly different than the singles. "Believe" was originally called "AI", and is a rewritten version of the earlier song "Conclusion". The song "Providence" was originally titled "Waltz". "Lastly" was re-recorded from their 1990 demo of the same name. In 2000, the band re-recorded "Believe", which was their first single, for the compilation album Period -the Best Selection-.

Eden was remastered and re-released by Universal Music Group on December 5, 2007, it came with a DVD of the promotional videos for "Believe" and "In My Dream (With Shiver)". This version reached number 191 on the Oricon chart.

"In My Dream (With Shiver)" was covered by LM.C for the 2007 Luna Sea Memorial Cover Album -Re:birth-.

Luna Sea's second Lunatic X'Mas 2018 -Introduction to the 30th Anniversary- concert at Saitama Super Arena on December 23, 2018, was subtitled Search for My Eden after the album's 1993 tour. There they performed some songs that had not been played since the original tour.

Eden and the band's seven other major label studio albums, up to Luv, were released on vinyl record for the first time on May 29, 2019.

== Reception ==
Music writer Takuya Ito described Eden as having a sound centered around clean tones that exude a mysterious beauty and sense of floating. He stated that the members skillfully harness the fleeting glimpses of impulse and madness into melancholic harmony. Although noting some people have called the album "pop", Ito described the songs that follow the aggressive opener "Jesus" as having a transience and mysterious atmosphere, thereby setting them apart from simple pop music.

Music journalist Showgun Fuyu called Eden a "hidden masterpiece" that was born during the band's process of evolving from a hard and dark sound, to a "sublime" sound tinged with mystery. He wrote that it, and L'Arc-en-Ciel's Dune, which was released in the same month, injected some "white" into the visual kei scene, much to the surprise of Luna Sea fans. Fuyu also noted that it was with Eden that Sugizo changed from a hard rock and punk rock style of guitar playing, to the sound and style he would continue to use for the rest of his career.

== Track listing ==
All tracks are written by Luna Sea.

No.	Title	Length
1.	"Jesus" (Originally composed by J.)	4:19
2.	"Believe" (Originally composed by Sugizo.)	4:03
3.	"Rejuvenescence" (Originally composed by Inoran.)	3:37
4.	"Recall" (Originally composed by Inoran.)	4:57
5.	"Anubis" (Originally composed by Sugizo.)	4:04
6.	"Lastly" (Originally composed by Inoran.)	6:02
7.	"In My Dream (With Shiver)" (Originally composed by J.)	5:05
8.	"Steal" (Originally composed by J.)	4:16
9.	"Lamentable" (Originally composed by Inoran.)	4:20
10.	"Providence" (Originally composed by Sugizo.)	3:08
11.	"Stay" (Originally composed by J.)	3:51
