= 25th Anniversary Ultimate Best -The One- =

Compilation album by Luna Sea
- Released: May 28, 2014
- Genre: Rock
- Label: Universal J
- Producer: Luna Sea

25th Anniversary Ultimate Best -The One- is a two-disc compilation album released by Luna Sea on May 28, 2014. All tracks were remastered from their original versions. Tracks 1.2, 2.6 and 2.8 are from their 2011 self-cover album, and track 1.14 is the re-recording from 2000's Period -the Best Selection- compilation. The release was also bundled with Never Sold Out 2 as a "2 in 1 Box" set.

== Track listing ==
All tracks are written by Luna Sea.

Disc 1
No.	Title	Length
1.	"Loveless"	5:35
2.	"Precious..." (from Luna Sea 2011 self-cover album)	4:32
3.	"Rosier"	5:25
4.	"Gravity"	5:30
5.	"Believe"	4:17
6.	"I for You"	5:30
7.	"In My Dream (With Shiver)"	5:05
8.	"Desire"	4:27
9.	"Mother"	5:23
10.	"Promise"	3:57
11.	"Breathe"	5:50
12.	"Tonight"	3:03
13.	"Love Song"	7:14
14.	"Wish" (from Period)	5:51

Disc 2
No.	Title	Length
1.	"Storm"	5:04
2.	"Déjàvu"	3:52
3.	"Sweetest Coma Again feat. DJ Krush"	5:06
4.	"End of Sorrow"	4:22
5.	"True Blue"	3:46
6.	"Blue Transparency Kagirinaku Tōmei ni Chikai Burū" (BLUE TRANSPARENCY 限りなく 透明に 近い ブルー, from LUNA SEA 2011 self-cover album)	3:46
7.	"Shine"	4:47
8.	"Moon" (from Luna Sea 2011 self-cover album)	7:55
9.	"In Silence"	5:39
10.	"The One -Crash to Create-"	22:54
