= Another Side of Singles II =

Compilation album by Luna Sea
- Released: March 6, 2002
- Genres: Alternative rock; pop rock
- Length: 46:32
- Label: Universal

Luna Sea chronology
Piano Solo Instruments 4 (2001)	Another Side of Singles II (2002)	Slow (2005)

Another Side of Singles II is a compilation album that contains all the B-sides from singles released by Luna Sea from 1998 to 2000. It was released on March 6, 2002, reached number 30 on the Oricon Albums Chart, and charted for two weeks.

== Track listing ==
No.	Title	Length
1.	"Kono Sekai no Hate de" (この世界の果てで, from "Storm")	5:59
2.	"Looper" (from "Shine")	4:10
3.	"With" (from "I for You")	5:57
4.	"Inside You" (from "Gravity")	4:21
5.	"My Lover" (from "Gravity")	4:16
6.	"Be Gone" (from "Tonight")	5:14
7.	"Be in Agony" (from "Tonight")	4:21
8.	"Into the Sun" (from "Love Song")	7:12
9.	"Until the Day I Die" (from "Love Song")	5:02
