= Another Side =

Another Side may refer to:

- Another Side (Corbin Bleu album), 2007 album
- Another Side (Fingers Inc. album), 1988 album
- Another Side (John Barrowman album), 2007 album
- Another Side of Bob Dylan, 1964 Bob Dylan album
- Another Side of Genesis, 2004 Daryl Stuermer album
- Another Side of Singles II, 2002 Luna Sea compilation album
- Another Side of This Life: The Lost Recordings of Gram Parsons, 2004 Gram Parsons compilation album
- "Another Side", a song by Sawyer Brown from the album Six Days on the Road
