= In My Dream (With Shiver) =

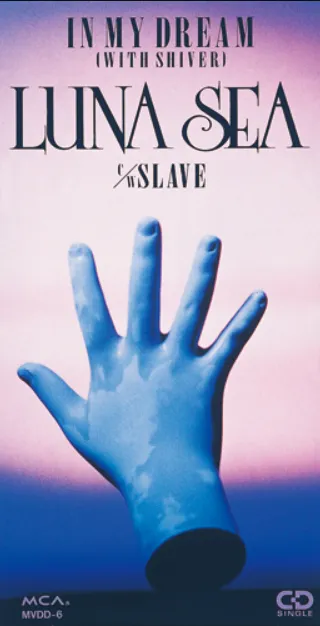

Single by Luna Sea

from the album Eden
- B-side: "Slave"
- Released: July 21, 1993
- Genre: Alternative rock, progressive rock
- Length: 8:48
- Label: MCA Victor
- Songwriter: Luna Sea
- Producer: Luna Sea

Luna Sea singles chronology
"Believe" (1993)	"In My Dream (With Shiver)" (1993)	"Rosier" (1994)

Music video
- "In My Dream (With Shiver)" on YouTube

"In My Dream (With Shiver)" is the second single by Japanese rock band Luna Sea, released by MCA Victor on July 21, 1993. The song reached number 9 on the Oricon Singles Chart, and charted for four weeks.

== Overview ==
This single version of "In My Dream (With Shiver)" is slightly different from the one on the album, Eden. Although it was not released until this single, the band had been performing "Slave" since 1990. The song has since become a staple at Luna Sea concerts despite being a B-side. "Slave" is also the namesake of the band's official fan club, Slave, that was established in January 1992.

"In My Dream (With Shiver)" was covered by the band LM.C for the Luna Sea Memorial Cover Album -Re:birth-.

== Track listing ==
All tracks arranged by Luna Sea.

No.	Title	Lyrics	Music	Length
1.	"In My Dream (With Shiver)"	Luna Sea	Luna Sea	5:14
2.	"Slave"	Ryuichi	J	3:34

== Personnel ==
Luna Sea

- Ryuichi – vocals
- Sugizo – guitar
- Inoran – guitar
- J – bass
- Shinya – drums

Production

- Yugi Sugiyama – co-producer and recording on track 1, synthesizer programming on tracks 1 and 2
- Hitoshi Hiruma – mixing on tracks 1 and 2, recording on track 2
