= Xaa-Xaa =

Japanese rock band

- Origin: Osaka, Japan
- Years active: 2014–present
- Label: Timely
- Members: Kazuki; Haru; Reiya; An
- Past members: Roji
- Website: xaa-xaa.com

Xaa-Xaa (Japanese: ザアザア; alternately written as XaaXaa) is a Japanese visual kei rock band formed in Osaka in 2014. They are signed with Timely Records. Their current lineup consists of Kazuki on vocals, Haru on guitar, Reiya on bass and An on drums.

They were ranked 10th on visual kei artists by JRock News in 2020.

== Career ==
The band was formed with Kazuki, Haru and Reiya, but had Roji on drums. They were mostly active around their hometown scene. On December 3, 2015, they performed at the anniversary concert for Osaka Muse venue, announcing the simultaneous release of the single "Shitai Dakedeshi yo?", and a compilation album "Chūdoku Shōjō" on March 23. Roji left the band in August 2017.

The single "Horror" was released on April 22, 2020 and, four months later, they announced a new EP called Ai (愛)「」, relesead on September 28. On May 5, 2021, the EP Gogatsubyou (五月病) came out, which had its title song's video released on April. It was the best selling album of the band until that point. In June, they announced their second studio album, the first in four years, called Shippaisaku (失敗作), relseased on October 10.

In 2023, they released three singles: "Kumo no Ito" (蜘蛛の糸) in April, "Hishatai wa Shitai" (被写体は死体) in July, and "Draw" (ドロー) in October. The last one was released in seven versions and was the ending theme for the anime Duel Masters: WIN Duel Academy Edition, it was the first time the band had a song in an anime series. Xaa-Xaa performed internationally for the first time at Katsucon, in the United States, in February, 2024.

== Influences ==
Kazuki became interested in music through Mucc, while Haru cited Hide as the reason he started playing music. Reiya discovered rock music through Kuroyume, and also likes Dir En Grey and the Gazette. He cited J as his biggest influence on bass, and wears his guitar strap long because of Sid bassist Aki. Roji's musicial background is in Western hard rock, such as Mötley Crüe.

== Band members ==
- Kazuki (一葵) – vocals
- Haru (春) – guitar
- Reiya (零夜) – bass
- An (亞ん) – drums

=== Former members ===
- Roji (ロ弍) – drums

== Discography ==
Title	Japanese	Released on	Oricon chart
Chūdoku Shōjō	中毒症状	March 23, 2016	–
Ame ni Korosareru	雨に殺される	May 25, 2016	166
Fukou na Meiro	不幸な迷路	March 27, 2017	90
Minna ga Uta	みんながうた	October 30, 2019	59
Chuudoku shoujou ~Ni~	中毒症状～ニ～	December 11, 2019	148
Ai " "	愛「」	September 23, 2020	48
Gogatsubyou"	五月病	May 5, 2021	95
