= Luna Sea (Luna Sea album) =

1991 studio album by Luna Sea

- The album cover featuring the band, clockwise from top-left: Sugizo, Ryuichi, J, Inoran, Shinya

Studio album by Luna Sea
- Released: April 21, 1991
- Recorded: 1990–1991
- Studio: Gok
- Genres: Punk rock; hard rock; progressive rock
- Length: 38:02
- Label: Extasy
- Producer: Luna Sea

Luna Sea chronology
Luna Sea (1991)	Image (1992)

Luna Sea is the debut studio album by Japanese rock band Luna Sea, released on April 21, 1991, by Extasy Records. It sold over 30,000 copies by July 1992. After reuniting in 2010, Luna Sea re-recorded the whole album and released it on March 16, 2011, through HPQ.

== Overview ==
At a sold-out February 11, 1991, concert at Meguro Rock-May-Kan, Lunacy were discovered by X Japan guitarist hide and were signed by X Japan co-founder Yoshiki to his independent record label Extasy Records. The band changed their name from Lunacy to Luna Sea and took part in the label's sold out Nuclear Fusion Tour in March with Gilles de Rais and Sighs of Love Potion. On the tour, a 3-track sample CD including a song from each band was freely distributed, to which they contributed a short sample of "Precious". The album was released on April 21, 1991. According to music journalist Showgun Fuyu, Extasy spent three times as much money on promoting the album as it had for X's Vanishing Vision. In support of the record, Luna Sea held their first nationwide tour Under the New Moon, which started on June 13 and was separated into two legs or "Episodes" with a final concert held on September 19. However, a third leg of 17 shows was performed from October 13 to December 30. Luna Sea is the band's only release on an indie label as they signed to MCA Victor for their second album, 1992's Image.

The album's cover photo was taken in Inokashira Park in the winter. For the opening track "Fate", Sugizo said he was influenced by punk and hardcore, but also jazz and bossa nova-like chords, while the rhythm was inspired by King Crimson songs. He wanted to incorporate all these elements into punk-like music. "Time is Dead" is a re-written version of "Sexual" (later called "Sexual Parvarsion") from their 1989 demo tape "Lunacy". It is the first original song that J ever wrote. "Shade" was re-recorded from their 1989 demo of the same name. "Kagirinaku Tōmei ni Chikai Burū" (限りなく 透明に 近い ブルー) is translated as "Almost Transparent Blue," which comes from the Ryū Murakami novel of the same name. A longer, reworked version of "Moon" was recorded for their second album Image. "Precious..." was re-recorded for the 2000 compilation album Period -the Best Selection-. It was also covered by Merry for the 2007 Luna Sea Memorial Cover Album -Re:birth-.

The album was remastered by Ted Jensen and re-released by Universal Music Group on December 5, 2007. This edition came with a DVD which contained live promotional videos for the songs "Moon" and "Precious...", that were recorded at Nippon Seinenkan on September 19, 1991. Its 2007 rerelease reached number 123 on the Oricon Albums Chart.

== Reception ==
Music writer Takuya Ito described Luna Sea as overflowing with the wild impulses of youth and the ambition to rise to stardom. He wrote that the album strongly leans towards hardcore punk, but also includes hints of influence from bands such as X and Dead End. Ito noted that Ryuichi's intense and harsh vocals on Luna Sea contrast with how gentle he would become after the band signed to a major record label. Finding influence from British gothic and progressive rock in the album, Hiroko Yamamoto wrote that the dark songs have a cutting-edge and artistic feel. She also remarked how surprising it is to hear that the contrasting guitar styles of Sugizo and Inoran were already established on the band's first album.

== Track listing ==
All lyrics written by Ryuichi, except "Shade" by J and Ryuichi.

No.	Title	Music	Length
1.	"Fate"	Sugizo	1:20
2.	"Time is Dead"	J	4:15
3.	"Sandy Time"	Inoran	4:55
4.	"Branch Road"	Sugizo	3:51
5.	"Shade"	J	3:46
6.	"Blue Transparency Kagirinaku Tōmei ni Chikai Burū" (BLUE TRANSPARENCY 限りなく 透明に 近い ブルー)	Inoran	3:43
7.	"The Slain"	J	4:34
8.	"Chess"	Sugizo	3:05
9.	"Moon"	Sugizo	4:41
10.	"Precious..."	J	3:49

== Personnel ==
Luna Sea

- Vocals: Ryuichi
- Guitar: Sugizo
- Guitar: Inoran
- Bass: J
- Drums: Shinya

Production

- Producer and arranger: Luna Sea
- Engineers: Yoshiaki Kondo, Takao Okimoto, Atsushi Tanaka
- Direction: Mr. Hattori, Makoto Ebina, Akihiro Nagasaka
- Jacket design and photos: Saori Tsuji
- Costume coordinator: Sayuri Chihara
- Hair stylist: Tetsuya Endo

Personnel per album's liner notes.

== Charts ==
Chart (2007)	Peak position
Japanese Albums (Oricon)	123

== 2011 re-recording ==
Luna Sea
- The album cover featuring the band, from left to right: Shinya, J, Ryuichi, Sugizo, Inoran

Studio album by Luna Sea
- Released: March 16, 2011
- Recorded: 2010–2011 — Victor Studio, Studio Sound Dali, Kamome Studio, Art Terro Studio, Wonder Station
- Genres: Punk rock; hard rock; progressive rock
- Length: 43:55
- Label: HPQ/Avex
- Producer: Luna Sea

Luna Sea chronology
Lunacy (2000)	Luna Sea (2011)	A Will (2013)

In 2011, the band re-recorded the whole album and released it on March 16 on their new label HPQ, which is owned by Avex Group. When asked why they chose to re-record the album, Sugizo said "It’s sort of like returning to our origins. After ten years, we have to recreate ourselves, and going back to something as original and basic as our first album is part of the process. It’s very important to be able to recapture that feeling, and to recreate it with our current skills to show how we’ve improved over the years.", and Ryuichi added "The sound we have now has a similar feeling to our first album." It is notable that the version of "Moon" that appears on the re-recording is of the longer version of the song from their second album, Image.

It was released in three editions; a regular, a limited with a DVD of a music video for "Shade" that uses footage from their Lunacy Kurofuku Gentei Gig ~the Holy Night~ free concert on December 25, 2010, and a premium which includes a reproduction cassette of their 1989 demo "Shade" and a reproduction shirt from their 1991 Under the New Moon Episode I-III tours. The album reached number six on the Oricon Albums Chart and charted for seven weeks.

=== Reception ===
Reviewing the re-recording, music writer Takuya Ito remarked that adding 20 years' worth of experience and dignity created a whole new level of expressiveness that gives the previously sparse recordings a completely different quality. Although noting it toned down the punk and hardcore madness and impulsiveness of the original, he described it as feeling like a natural update, without any unnecessary reorganizations.

=== Track listing ===
2011 Re-recording
No.	Title	Length
1.	"Fate"	1:25
2.	"Time is Dead"	4:32
3.	"Sandy Time"	5:15
4.	"Branch Road"	4:05
5.	"Shade"	4:24
6.	"Blue Transparency Kagirinaku Tōmei ni Chikai Burū" (BLUE TRANSPARENCY 限りなく 透明に 近い ブルー)	3:49
7.	"The Slain"	4:45
8.	"Chess"	3:16
9.	"Moon"	7:54
10.	"Precious..."	4:29

=== Personnel ===
Luna Sea

- Vocals:Ryuichi
- Guitar, violin: Sugizo
- Guitar: Inoran
- Bass: J
- Drums: Shinya

Production

- Producer: Luna Sea
- Keyboard and sound effect programmer: Daisuke "d-kiku" Kikuchi
- Recording and mixing engineer: Hitoshi Hiruma
- Recording engineers: Kenichi Arai, Masaaki Tsuya (Kamome Studio), Tasumasa Yamashita, Akinori Kaizaki
- Recording assistant engineers: Yosuke Watanabe (Victor Studio), Junpei Ohno (Studio Sound Dali), Masayoshi Shinomiya (Studio Sound Dali), Tomotaka Saka (Wonder Station)
- Mixing assistant engineer: Yujiro Yonetsu (Prime Sound Studio Form)
- Mastering engineer: Ted Jensen (Sterling Sound)
- Mastering coordinator: Tsuyoshi Niwa (Sterling Sound)
- Additional mastering engineer: Kazushige Yamazaki (Flair Mastering), Ayako Kawamoto (Flair Mastering)
- Art direction and design: Shizuka Aikawa (Avex Marketing Inc.)
- Photograph: Yosuke Komatsu (Odd Job, Ltd.)
- Hair and Make up: Hirokazu Niwa (Maroonbrand), Hisako Araki (Octbre), Hiroshi Miyagi (Squash)
- Stylists: Yohei Usami (bNm), Bun, Saori
- Executive producers: Masatoshi Sakanoue (Luna Sea Inc.), Masato "Max" Matsuura (Avex Group)
- English lyric translations: Jessica Polichetti

Personnel per album's liner notes.

=== Charts ===
Chart (2011)	Peak position
Japanese Albums (Oricon)	6
