= 36th Japan Record Awards =

1994 Japanese music awards ceremony

- Date: 31 December 1994

Television/radio coverage
- Network: TBS

The 36th Japan Record Awards were held on 31 December 1994, and were broadcast live on TBS.

== Award winners ==
- Japan Record Award:
  - Takeshi Kobayashi (producer), Kazutoshi Sakurai (Songwriter and Composer) & Mr. Children for "Innocent World"
- Best Vocal Performance:
  - Miyuki Kawanaka
- Best New Artist:
  - Yuki Nishio
- Best Music Video:
  - "Rosier" by Luna Sea
  - "Kamisama no Hōseki de Dekita Shima" by Miya & Yami
