= Believe (Luna Sea song) =

Single by Luna Sea

from the album Eden
- B-side: "Claustrophobia"
- Released: February 24, 1993
- Genre: Alternative rock, progressive rock
- Length: 9:53
- Label: MCA Victor
- Composer: Sugizo
- Lyricist: Ryuichi
- Producer: Luna Sea

Luna Sea singles chronology
"Believe" (1993)	"In My Dream (With Shiver)" (1993)

Music video
- "Believe" on YouTube

"Believe" is the first single by Japanese rock band Luna Sea, released by MCA Victor as their major label debut on February 24, 1993. It reached number 11 on the Oricon Singles Chart, and sold over 200,000 copies.

== Overview ==
This single version of "Believe" is slightly different from the one on the album, Eden. The song was originally called "AI", and is a rewritten version of the band's earlier song "Conclusion". Guitarist Inoran is claustrophobic, which inspired him to compose the B-side "Claustrophobia".

The title track was re-recorded for their 2000 compilation album Period -the Best Selection-. Luna Sea played "Believe" jointly with X Japan at the hide memorial summit on May 4, 2008.

== Reception ==
"Believe" reached number 11 on the Oricon Singles Chart, and charted for seven weeks. In 2000, it was certified Gold by the RIAJ for sales over 200,000. In a 2021 poll conducted by Net Lab of 4,805 people on their favorite Luna Sea song, "Believe" came in seventh place with 285 votes.

== Track listing ==
No.	Title	Lyrics	Music	Length
1.	"Believe"	Ryuichi	Sugizo	4:17
2.	"Claustrophobia"	Ryuichi	Inoran	5:36

== Personnel ==
Luna Sea

- Ryuichi – vocals
- Sugizo – guitar, violin
- Inoran – guitar
- J – bass
- Shinya – drums

Production

- Hitoshi Hiruma – recording, mixing
- Yūgi Sugiyama – manipulation
