= Never Sold Out 2 =

- The album cover, showing the interior of the Tokyo Dome

Live album by Luna Sea
- Released: May 28, 2014
- Recorded: 1992-2013
- Genres: Progressive rock, hard rock
- Label: Universal J
- Producer: Luna Sea

Never Sold Out 2 is a two disc live album by Luna Sea, released for their 25th anniversary on May 28, 2014. It is a follow-up to the 1999 live album Never Sold Out, and compiles live recordings from 1992 to 2013. It was also bundled with 25th Anniversary Ultimate Best -The One- as a "2 in 1 Box" release.

== Track listing ==
All tracks are written by Luna Sea.

Disc 1
No.	Title	Length
1.	"Loveless" (2007.12.24 Tokyo Dome)	5:54
2.	"Déjàvu" (1994.12.27 Nippon Budokan)	4:36
3.	"Jesus" (2012.12.15 Zepp Tokyo)	4:31
4.	"Sweetest Coma Again feat. DJ Krush" (2010.12.31 Kobe World Memorial Hall)	5:04
5.	"True Blue" (2012.12.23 Osaka-jo Hall)	3:55
6.	"Gravity" (2000.8.2 Osaka-jo Hall)	5:58
7.	"I for You" (1999.1.14 Hong Kong Convention and Exhibition Centre GRAND HALL)	5:59
8.	"Promise" (2012.12.24 Sendai Sun Plaza)	4:02
9.	"Time is Dead" (2012.12.15 Zepp Tokyo)	5:23
10.	"Rosier" (1998.12.24 Tokyo Dome)	6:16
11.	"Tonight" (2010.12.23 Tokyo Dome)	4:19
12.	"Love Song" (2000.12.26 Tokyo Dome)	8:49
13.	"Wish" (2007.12.24 Tokyo Dome)	7:06

Disc 2
No.	Title	Length
1.	"Chess" (2012.12.15 Zepp Tokyo)	2:54
2.	"Imitation" (1992.3.20 Shibuya Public Hall)	3:28
3.	"Recall" (1993.8.30 Nippon Budokan)	5:13
4.	"Civilize" (1995.12.23 Tokyo Dome)	3:30
5.	"Luv U" (1995.12.23 Tokyo Dome)	5:18
6.	"Broken" (1998.11.17 Ishikawa Kouseinenkin Kaikan)	5:53
7.	"My Lover" (2000.8.2 Osaka-jo Hall)	4:20
8.	"The One -Crash to Create-" (2013.1.11 Nippon Budokan)	23:21
