= Lunacy (album) =

2000 studio album by Luna Sea

Studio album by Luna Sea
- Released: July 12, 2000
- Recorded: 1999–2000; Fun House Sapporo, Hitokuchizaka, Crescente, Sound Sky, Onkio Haus Art Terro
- Genre: Alternative rock
- Length: 58:20
- Label: Universal
- Producer: Luna Sea

Luna Sea chronology
Shine (1998)	Lunacy (2000)	A Will (2013)

Singles from Lunacy
- 1. "Gravity" Released: March 29, 2000; 2. "Tonight" Released: May 17, 2000

Lunacy is the seventh studio album by Japanese rock band Luna Sea, released on July 12, 2000. It reached number three on the Oricon Albums Chart, charted for six weeks, and was the band's last studio album before disbanding in late 2000.

== Overview ==
With only the singles "Gravity" and "Tonight" released, Luna Sea decided to do something unprecedented in the Japanese music industry and held the Premiere of Lunacy 2000 concert. At the Nippon Budokan on May 23, 2000, the band only performed songs from the two singles and the upcoming album.

They then embarked on a sold out two part tour, Brand New Chaos, which included three international shows; two in Hong Kong and one in Taipei. However, on November 8, 2000, two days before the first Hong Kong show, Luna Sea held a press conference in the city and announced they would be "dropping the curtain" after two farewell shows at the Tokyo Dome on December 26 and 27.

Two of Lunacy's songs, "Sweetest Coma Again" and "Kiss", feature hip hop disc jockey DJ Krush whom Inoran and Sugizo previously worked with on their solo careers.

The album was remastered and re-released on December 5, 2007, it came with a DVD of the promotional videos for "Gravity", "Tonight" and "Love Song". This version reached number 225 on the Oricon chart.

Lunacy and the band's other seven major label studio albums, up to Luv, were released on vinyl record for the first time on May 29, 2019.

== Reception ==
Music writer Takuya Ito wrote that Lunacy shows Luna Sea's spirit, rooted in ambition and change, and their drive to reach new places remain unchanged even at the end of their career. He found the album to better show each band member's individual tastes, with "Sweetest Coma Again" and "Kiss" being mixture rock by featuring DJ Krush, "A Vision" starting with an industrial intro before turning into thunderous heavy rock, and "Feel" which gracefully moves back and forth between heaviness and beauty.

== Legacy ==
A slightly different version of "Sweetest Coma Again" was used as the theme song for the Japanese dub of the James Bond film The World Is Not Enough, and it appears on the Japanese edition of the movie's soundtrack. It was also covered by Abingdon Boys School for the 2007 Luna Sea Memorial Cover Album -Re:birth-.

"Gravity" was used as the theme song for the Japanese film Another Heaven. It has been covered live by Inoran himself during his solo career, and was also covered by American pop rock singer Marié Digby for her 2009 album Second Home.

"Tonight" was used as the theme song for the WOWOW broadcast of the UEFA Euro 2000. Also it has been covered live by J and Inoran themselves during their solo careers.

== Track listing ==
All tracks are written by Luna Sea.

No.	Title	Length
1.	"Be Awake" (Originally composed by Sugizo.)	4:04
2.	"Sweetest Coma Again feat. DJ Krush" (Originally composed by J. Originally written by J and Ryuichi.)	5:07
3.	"Gravity" (Originally composed by Inoran.)	5:37
4.	"Kiss feat. DJ Krush" (Originally written and composed by Sugizo.)	6:45
5.	"4:00 AM" (Originally written and composed by Inoran.)	5:33
6.	"Virgin Mary" (Originally composed by Sugizo.)	9:15
7.	"White Out" (Originally composed by Inoran.)	4:04
8.	"A Vision" (Originally composed by J.)	4:41
9.	"Feel" (Originally composed by Sugizo.)	4:38
10.	"Tonight" (Originally composed by J.)	3:03
11.	"Crazy About You" (Originally written and composed by J.)	5:34

== Personnel ==
Luna Sea

- Ryuichi – vocals
- Sugizo – guitar, violin
- Inoran – guitar
- J – bass
- Shinya – drums, percussion

Other

- DJ Krush – turntables on "Sweetest Coma Again" and "Kiss"
- Les Yeux – female voice on "Gravity" and "Virgin Mary"
- Daisuke Kikuchi – synthesizer, programming
- Masahiro Tanaka Strings – strings
- Kevin Davy – trumpet on "Kiss"
