= True Blue (Luna Sea song) =

Single by Luna Sea

from the album Mother
- B-side: "Fallout"
- Released: September 21, 1994
- Genre: Alternative rock, punk rock, progressive rock
- Length: 10:03
- Label: MCA Victor
- Songwriter: Luna Sea
- Producer: Luna Sea

Luna Sea singles chronology
"Rosier" (1994)	"True Blue" (1994)	"Mother" (1994)

Music video
- "True Blue" on YouTube

"True Blue" is the fourth single by Japanese rock band Luna Sea, released by MCA Victor on September 21, 1994. It became the band's first number 1 single on the Oricon Singles Chart, sold over 419,000 copies, and was certified Platinum by the RIAJ.

== Reception ==
"True Blue" was Luna Sea's first number 1 on the Oricon Singles Chart, and charted for 17 weeks. In 2000, it was certified Platinum by the RIAJ for sales over 400,000. It is the band's fifth best-selling single, with 419,000 copies sold. In a 2021 poll conducted by Net Lab of 4,805 people on their favorite Luna Sea song, "True Blue" came in fourth place with 365 votes.

The song was covered by melodic death metal band Blood Stain Child for their 2005 album Idolator.

== Track listing ==
All tracks written and arranged by Luna Sea.

No.	Title	Length
1.	"True Blue"	3:55
2.	"Fallout"	6:58

== Personnel ==
Luna Sea

- Ryuichi – vocals
- Sugizo – guitar, violin
- Inoran – guitar
- J – bass
- Shinya – drums

Production

- Hitoshi Hiruma – recording and mixing
