= Image (album) =

1992 studio album by Luna Sea

Studio album by Luna Sea
- Released: May 21, 1992
- Recorded: Victor Studio, Studio Vincent, Magnet Studio, Den Music Studio, Studio EGM, Freedom Studio, RMC Studio, MIT Studio, Echo House
- Genres: Punk rock; hard rock; progressive rock
- Length: 54:42
- Label: MCA Victor
- Producer: Luna Sea

Luna Sea chronology
Luna Sea (1991)	Image (1992)	Eden (1993)

Music video
- "Déjàvu" on YouTube

Live
- "Wish" 2018 Luv Tour Final Budokan Ver. on YouTube

Image is the second studio album by Japanese rock band Luna Sea, released on May 21, 1992. It is their major label debut on MCA Victor, reached number nine on the Oricon Albums Chart, and charted for 14 weeks. In 2000, it was certified Platinum by the RIAJ for sales over 400,000.

== Overview ==
With the success of their 1991 Under the New Moon Tour, several major record labels were trying to sign Luna Sea, but the band turned them all down as they felt it was too soon. When Akira Sekiguchi, director of Victor, agreed to allow them to debut with an album and to allow the band to self-produce it, Luna Sea signed to MCA Victor and released Image on May 21, 1992. The album was supported by the Image or Real, its three date encore, and After the Image tours for a total of 25 shows and an accumulative audience of 28,500.

The song "Search For Reason" is re-recorded from their 1989 demo "Shade". "Vampire's Talk" was originally titled "Feeling", and "In Mind" was titled "Sinful Song". This recording of "Moon" is a longer, reworked version of the song from their debut album Luna Sea. Guitarist Sugizo cited "Wish" as one of the songs wherein he tried to replicate the "psychedelic feel of shoegaze bands" by using effects, "like playing fast with a wah-wah pedal, or using tape-echo and harmonizers. I couldn’t figure out how they did it, so I just made it into my own thing."

"Déjàvu" and "Wish" were both re-recorded by the band for the 2000 compilation album Period -the Best Selection-.

Image was remastered and re-released by Universal Music Group on December 5, 2007, it came with a DVD of the promotional video for "Déjàvu". This version reached number 189 on the Oricon chart.

"Déjàvu" was also covered by Mucc for the 2007 Luna Sea Memorial Cover Album -Re:birth-.

This album's version of "Moon" was covered by Masami Tsuchiya for the 2007 Luna Sea Memorial Cover Album -Re:birth-.

"Wish" was covered by Sid for the 2007 Luna Sea Memorial Cover Album -Re:birth-.

Luna Sea's first Lunatic X'Mas 2018 -Introduction to the 30th Anniversary- concert at Saitama Super Arena on December 22, 2018 was subtitled Image or Real after the album's 1992 tour. There they performed some songs that had not been played since the original tour.

Image and the band's seven other major label studio albums, up to Luv, were released on vinyl record for the first time on May 29, 2019.

== Reception ==
Music writer Takuya Ito described Image as marking a sudden awakening of Luna Sea's aesthetic vision. With a fusion of intricate melodies and the impulsiveness from their indie days, he said it is packed with the seeds that would later blossom into the visual kei boom. Ito wrote that while the harshness of their first album has faded somewhat, the refinement that comes with signing to a major record label and their captivating maniacal side shine through.

== Track listing ==
All lyrics written by Ryuichi, except "Wish" by Ryuichi and J.

No.	Title	Music	Length
1.	"Call For Love"	Sugizo	0:42
2.	"Déjàvu"	Sugizo	3:54
3.	"Mechanical Dance"	J	5:05
4.	"Wall"	Sugizo	4:55
5.	"Image"	Inoran	5:41
6.	"Search For Reason"	Sugizo	7:10
7.	"Imitation"	J	3:22
8.	"Vampire's Talk"	Inoran	6:16
9.	"Symptom"	Sugizo	2:15
10.	"In Mind"	J	3:54
11.	"Moon"	Sugizo	7:10
12.	"Wish"	J	4:18

== Personnel ==
Luna Sea

- Vocals: Ryuichi
- Guitar, violin: Sugizo
- Guitar: Inoran
- Bass: J
- Drums, percussion: Shinya

Additional performers

- Chorus: Yurie Kokubu, Kaoru Akimoto
- Chorus arrangement: Hidekazu Tokumitsu

Production

- Producer and arranger: Luna Sea
- Executive producers: Masatoshi Sakanoue (Sweet Child), Seiichiro Ishihara, Takafumi Muraki (Victor Invitation)
- Supervisor: Hiroyuki Iwata
- Director: Yoshiyuki Maki, Akira Sekiguchi (Victor Invitation)
- Recorder, mixer: Masayuki Nakahara (Victor Studio)
- Additional engineers: Hirokazu Akashi (Victor Studio), Shigetoshi Saito (Victor Studio)
- Mastering engineer: Hiroshi Kawasaki (Victor Studio)
- Assistant engineers: Masayuki Oka (Victor Studio), Tomoaki Sato (Victor Vincent), Takashi Kondo (Victor Vincent), Terushi Maruyama (Magnet Studio), Osamu Konishi (Den Music Studio), Akihiro Sano (Studio EGM), Minoru Yasuda (Freedom Studio), Toshio Tanabe (RMC Studio), Shigeru Matsumura (MIT Studio), Satoru Arai (Echo House)
- Sound effects: Keishi Urata, Tsuyoshi Kon, Kunihiko Tominaga, Manabu Ogasawara, Tsutomu Nakayama
- Sound adviser: Kazutaka Minemori
- Drum tuner: Yukihiro Sugimoto
- Adviser: Toshihiro Nara
- Art direction & graphic design: Sakaguchi Ken Factory
- Design coordinator: Tatsuo Sato
- Photography: Bruno Dayan
- Hair & make-up: Tetsuya Kameyama
- Stylist: Sayuri Chihara
- Costumes: Mikako Ohhara
- Cover model: Sakuraku K.
- Shinya's model: Sayuri Ichijyo H
- Sugizo's doll: Katan Amano, Ryoichi Yoshida

Personnel per album's liner notes.
