= Tonight (Luna Sea song) =

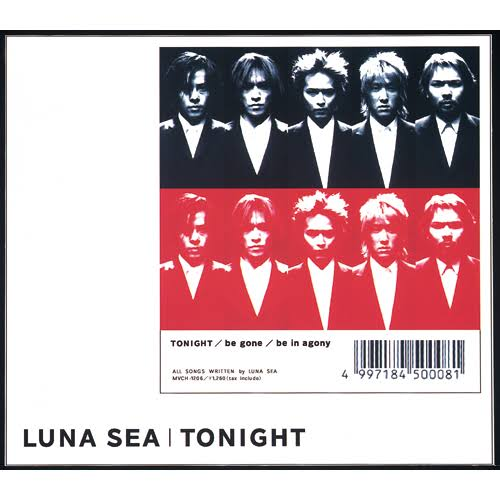

Single by Luna Sea

from the album Lunacy
- B-side: "Be Gone", "Be in Agony"
- Released: May 17, 2000
- Genre: Alternative rock
- Length: 12:32
- Label: Universal
- Songwriter: Luna Sea
- Producer: Luna Sea

Luna Sea singles chronology
"Gravity" (2000)	"Tonight" (2000)	"Love Song" (2000)

Music video
- "Tonight" on YouTube

"Tonight" is the thirteenth single by Japanese rock band Luna Sea, released by Universal on May 17, 2000. It reached number 4 on the Oricon Singles Chart, and charted for eight weeks.

== Overview ==
The promotional video for "Tonight" was directed by Shūichi Tan, who previously directed the video for "Gravity". It features model and actor Enrique Sakamoto.

The song has been covered live by J at some of his solo concerts. It was also used as the theme for WOWOW's broadcast of the UEFA Euro 2000.

== Reception ==
"Tonight" reached number 4 on the Oricon Singles Chart, and charted for eight weeks. In a 2021 poll conducted by Net Lab of 4,805 people on their favorite Luna Sea song, "Tonight" came in third place with 377 votes.

== Track listing ==
All songs written and composed by Luna Sea.

1. "Tonight" - 3:02
  Originally written and composed by J.
2. "Be Gone" - 5:11
  Originally composed by Inoran.
3. "Be in Agony" - 4:19
  Originally composed by Inoran.
