= Gravity (Luna Sea song) =

2000 single by Japanese rock band Luna Sea

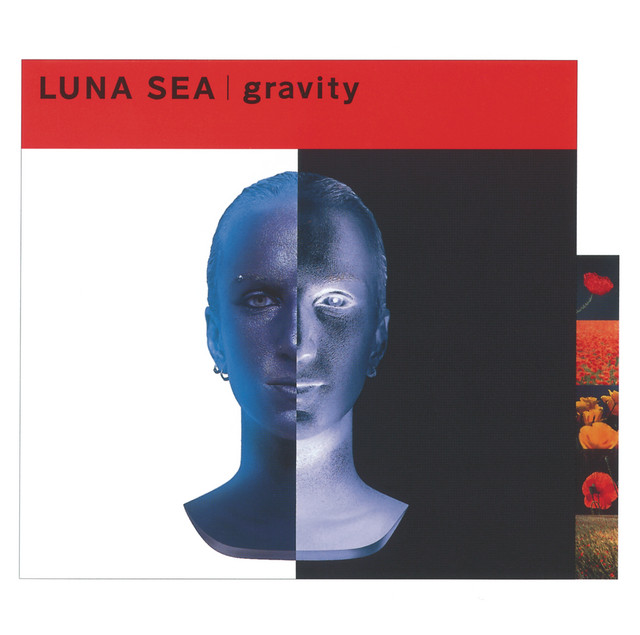

Single by Luna Sea

from the album Lunacy
- Released: March 29, 2000
- Genre: Alternative rock
- Length: 14:13
- Label: Universal
- Songwriter: Luna Sea
- Producer: Luna Sea

Luna Sea singles chronology
"I for You" (1998)	"Gravity" (2000)	"Tonight" (2000)

Music video
- "Gravity" on YouTube

"Gravity" is the twelfth single by Japanese rock band Luna Sea, released by Universal on March 29, 2000. It was the band's sixth number one on the Oricon Singles Chart, and was certified Gold by the RIAJ for sales over 200,000. The single was released in Taiwan on April 7, 2000.

== Overview ==
"Gravity" is a ballad-style song with a 16-beat rhythm. Both the music and lyrics were written by Inoran. He described it as "even though released in spring, the lyrics actually create a strong expression of autumn." Its music video was directed by Shūichi Tan, who went on to direct the video for Luna Sea's next single, "Tonight".

"Inside You" is one of only two Luna Sea song originally written and composed by Shinya. "My Lover" was originally composed by Sugizo.

"Gravity" and "My Lover" were first performed during the Start Up Gig 2000, a live performance at Zepp Tokyo. Those songs were both used in the Japanese film Another Heaven, "Gravity" being its theme song. These songs were included on the film's first soundtrack, while an orchestrated version of "Gravity" was included on the second soundtrack as "Gravity on the Edge of the World".

A computer-generated portrait combining facial features from all five members is placed on the inner cover of this single, nicknamed "Tom", and also appears in the album Lunacy.

== Reception ==
"Gravity" was Luna Sea's sixth number one on the Oricon Singles Chart, and stayed on the chart for 12 weeks. In 2000, it was certified Gold by the RIAJ for sales over 200,000. In a 2021 poll conducted by Net Lab of 4,805 people on their favorite Luna Sea song, "Gravity" came in second place with 506 votes.

The song has been covered live by Inoran himself during his solo career. American pop rock singer Marié Digby covered it for her 2009 album Second Home.

== Track listing ==
All songs written and composed by Luna Sea.

1. "Gravity" - 4:37
2. "Inside You" - 4:21
3. "My Lover" - 4:16
