= Never Sold Out =

Live album by Luna Sea
- Released: May 29, 1999
- Recorded: 1991-1998
- Genres: Progressive rock, hard rock
- Length: Disc 1 75:24, Disc 2 72:08
- Label: Universal Music Group
- Producer: Luna Sea

Never Sold Out is a live double album by Japanese rock band Luna Sea, released on their 10th anniversary, May 29, 1999. It compiles live recordings spanning their career up to that point, from 1991 to 1998. The album reached number five on the Oricon Albums Chart, and charted for six weeks. In June 1999, it was certified Gold by the RIAJ for sales over 200,000.

== Track listing ==
All tracks are written by Luna Sea.

Disc 1
No.	Title	Length
1.	"Loveless" (Tokyo Dome December 23, 1995)
2.	"Déjàvu" (Tottori Prefectural Culture Hall December 10, 1998)
3.	"End of Sorrow" (Mie Prefectural Culture Hall December 8, 1998)
4.	"Believe" (Nippon Budokan August 31, 1996)
5.	"Sandy Time" (Shibuya Public Hall March 20, 1992)
6.	"Providence" (Tokyo Dome December 24, 1998)
7.	"Another" (Tokyo Dome December 23, 1998)
8.	"Storm" (Tokyo Dome December 23, 1998)
9.	"Silent Night ~ Moon" (Yokohama Stadium December 23, 1996)
10.	"Shade" (Japan Youth Hall December 30, 1991)
11.	"Rosier" (Yokohama Stadium December 23, 1996)
12.	"Mother" (Tokyo Dome December 23, 1995)

Disc 2
No.	Title	Length
1.	"Time Has Come" (Tokyo Dome December 24, 1998)
2.	"G." (Yokohama Stadium December 23, 1996)
3.	"Face to Face" (Nippon Budokan December 27, 1994)
4.	"Desire" (Toyama Aubade Hall November 16, 1998)
5.	"Ra-Se-N" (Yokohama Stadium August 10, 1998)
6.	"Genesis of Mind ~Yume no Kanata e~" (〜夢の彼方へ〜) (Nippon Budokan August 31, 1996)
7.	"In My Dream (With Shiver)" (Tokyo Dome December 23, 1995)
8.	"In Future" (Hibiya Open-Air Concert Hall April 2, 1995)
9.	"I for You" (Tokyo Dome December 23, 1998)
10.	"Precious..." (Shibuya Public Hall March 20, 1992)
11.	"Wish" (Nippon Budokan August 30, 1993)
12.	"Up to You" (Tokyo Dome December 23, 1998)
