= J (bassist) =

Japanese musician and singer-songwriter (born 1970)

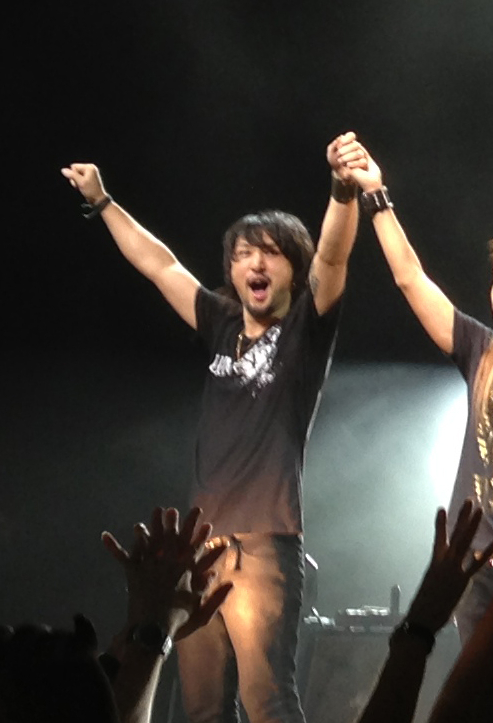
- J in Singapore, 2013

Background information
- Born: Jun Onose (小野瀬 潤); August 12, 1970 (age 56); Tokyo, Japan
- Origin: Hadano, Kanagawa
- Genres: Alternative rock, post-grunge, punk rock, hard rock
- Occupations: Musician, singer-songwriter, record producer
- Instruments: Vocals, bass guitar, guitar
- Years active: 1986–present
- Labels: Universal; Avex Group/Blowgrow
- Member of: Luna Sea
- Formerly of: Zilch
- Website: www.j-wumf.com

Jun Onose (Japanese: 小野瀬 潤, Hepburn: Onose Jun; born August 12, 1970), better known by his stage name J, is a Japanese musician, singer-songwriter and record producer. He is best known as bassist and co-founder of the rock band Luna Sea since 1986. After they disbanded in December 2000, he focused on his solo career, which first began in 1997. He rejoined Luna Sea when they reunited in August 2010.

J ranked tenth on Bass Magazine's list of the 100 Greatest Bassists, and Luna Sea are regarded as one of the most influential bands in the visual kei scene. Musicians such as Shun (Totalfat), Ni~ya (Nightmare), Reita (The Gazette), and RxYxO (Coldrain) have cited him as an influence. Since 1997, J has had prominent names in the music industry playing on his albums, as his backing band, or appearing as guests at his concerts, including Scott Garrett, Billy Duffy and Ian Astbury (all three from The Cult), Franz Stahl (Scream), Steve Jones (The Sex Pistols), Duff McKagan and Slash (both from Guns N' Roses), and Takashi Fujita (Doom).

== Early life ==
Jun Onose was born in Tokyo on August 12, 1970. His mother's family home was in Jingūmae. Due to his father's work, the family moved to Ashikaga, Tochigi, then to Zama, Kanagawa, before settling in Hadano, Kanagawa when J was in the fourth grade of elementary school. As a child, J was obsessed with soccer until his sister, who is five years older, introduced him to rock music. He first encountered Western music in elementary school, then, when he entered middle school, he was able to use his school ID to rent record's from a shop near his home. J said he listened to every record they had, going through alphabetically and choosing based on whichever caught his eye. He cited the Sex Pistols and U2 as bands that drew him into rock music.

J had already decided that he wanted to be in a band by the time he was in middle school. The first thing he learned to play on guitar was the riff to Michael Jackson's "Beat It". Because everyone wanted to play guitar, including himself, J casually chose bass without even knowing what the difference was. He practiced by reading the tablatures of various songs by different bands, often being so engrossed he did not realize morning had come. The first song he learned to play all the way through on bass was the Sex Pistols' "Silly Thing". Middle school is also when he met and began playing music with his classmate Inoran, after asking to borrow his copy of Howard Jones' album Human's Lib. Although they would get together with friends and declare themselves to be in bands, only the one he formed in his third year featured members that all had instruments, and even then, they only ever practiced. Thus, J said he does not consider these middle school groups to be a part of his band history. However, it was during this time that he became known by the nickname "J", in order to differentiate himself from a friend with the same given name. The drummer of one of these bands was the younger sister of Sugizo.

Because they did not know anyone as passionate about music as themselves, J and Inoran specifically chose a high school that had a light music club, but were disappointed to learn that they were already more skilled than their seniors. J used his sister's bass guitar until buying his own in high school. While in high school, J was a roadie for Dean, bassist of the thrash metal band Aion, for about two years. He said the job was another type of school, teaching him how the music scene worked; such as, how to get booked at a venue, when to transport your equipment there, and how to sell tickets. The members of Luna Sea later provided backing vocals to Aion's 1991 album Aionism, and J played bass on five songs for the 2008 self-titled debut album of Aion leader Izumi's death metal band, The Braincase.

== Career ==
=== 1986–2000: Luna Sea ===
While in high school, J and Inoran formed a band called Lunacy in 1986. The name was chosen because they felt something akin to "madness" in their sound, the future they aspired to, and the things they were doing. As the other members left to pursue careers or college, in January 1989, they recruited Pinocchio drummer Shinya and guitarist Sugizo, who were a year older and had attended a different high school, but whom they knew from the local music scene. J had originally asked Shinya, but the drummer insisted that his friend Sugizo also join. J, who vaguely knew Sugizo as they had attended the same elementary school, did not object as he found the prospect of a twin guitar setup intriguing. In his autobiography, J recalls that Yasuhiro "Yasu" Imai, the band's vocalist and one of his closest friends, suddenly told him that he wanted to quit one day. He speculated that Yasu might have become uncomfortable because, like any band, the members grew at different rates, differences in direction became apparent, and their expectations of each other gradually increased. At the same time, he learned that Ryuichi was considering leaving his band Slaughter and said the timing worked out perfectly for Ryuichi to replace the outgoing Yasu as vocalist of Lunacy. Yasu went on to enter his family's business of creating eyewear, and J later collaborated with his brand, Less Than Human. The finalized lineup of Lunacy made their debut at Play House in Machida, Tokyo on May 29, 1989.

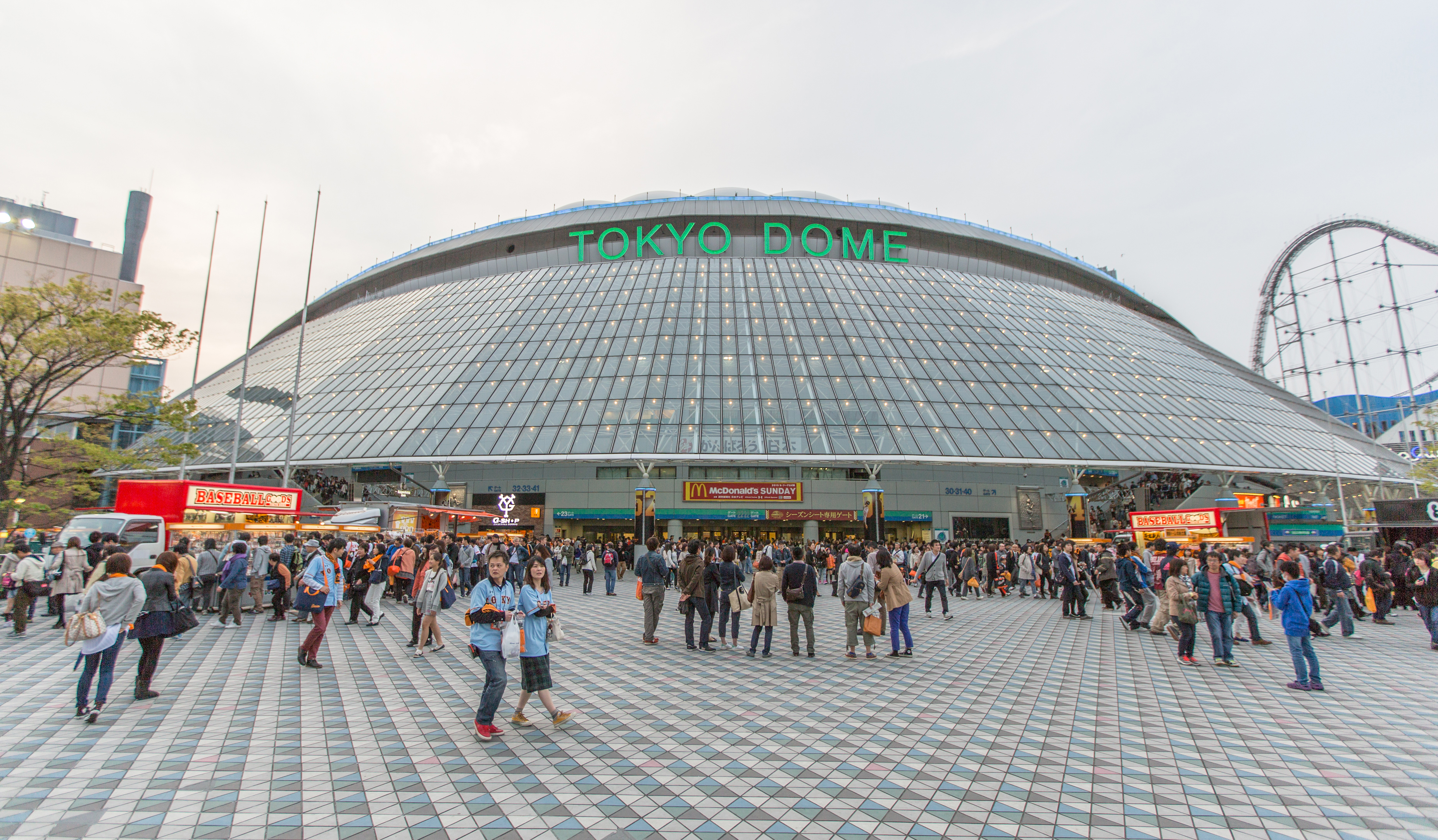
Luna Sea originally disbanded at the end of 2000 with two concerts at the Tokyo Dome.

After releasing three demo tapes, the band decided the next logical step was to release an album, and signed with Extasy Records. While creating the album, J suggested that Lunacy change their name. He felt that continuing with a name meaning "madness" might eventually trap and confine them, and wanted one that conveyed a deeper and broader meaning. "Luna Sea" suddenly came to him one day, and he proposed writing it in Japanese as "月海", which would evoke a mystical energy reminiscent of the ebb and flow of the tides. Additionally, he liked that there were very few bands that used something found in nature as their name, and the fact that no other band would dare change their name at such an important time as their debut album. The Japanese spelling was ultimately dropped, and the self-titled Luna Sea was released by Extasy in April 1991. It earned them offers from around 16 record companies, from which, the band chose MCA Victor and released their major debut album, Image, in May 1992. Luna Sea went on to become very successful, selling more than 10 million records, and are considered one of the most influential bands in the visual kei movement. Their 10th Anniversary Gig [Never Sold Out] Capacity ∞ concert held on May 30, 1999, was attended by 100,000 people, making it one of the largest-ticketed concerts ever held by a single act.

On November 8, 2000, it was announced that Luna Sea would disband after two concerts in December. The decision was made at a meeting held in a hotel suite after the August 2000 Fukuoka performances of their Brand New Chaos tour. Looking back decades later, J wrote that ever since they achieved their first Tokyo Dome concert in 1995, the members lacked a goal to strive for in unison, and that he personally started to sense the band was coming to its end when they regrouped and began working on the 1998 album Shine, after a year off in 1997 for solo activities. Although it was never said aloud, he suspects each member went into recording Lunacy, which was released in July 2000, with the feeling that it would be their last. Luna Sea played their final concerts at the Tokyo Dome on December 26 and 27, 2000. In 2003, HMV Japan ranked the band at number 90 on their list of the 100 most important Japanese pop acts.

=== 1997–2010: Solo career ===
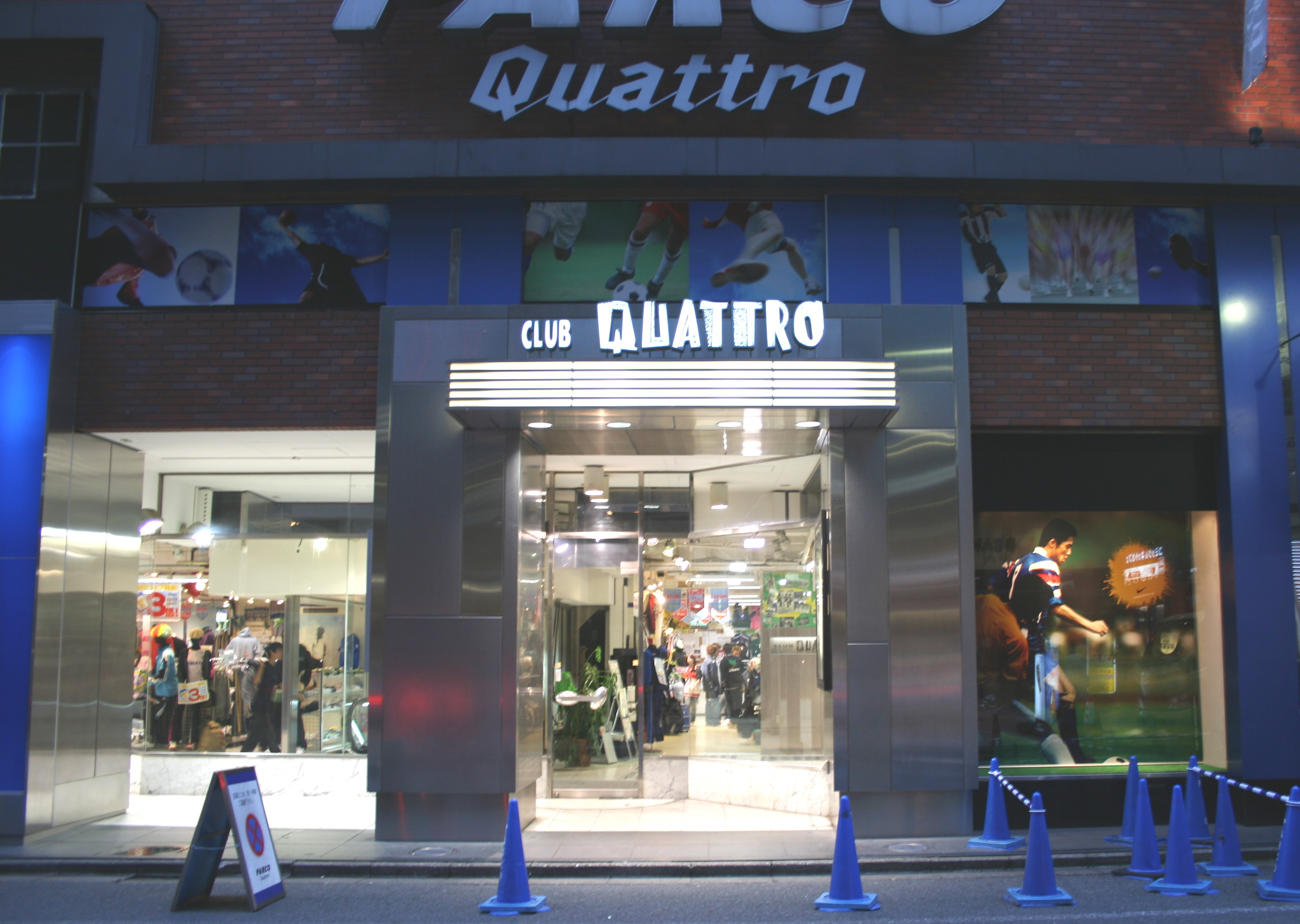
J performed his first solo concert at Shibuya Club Quattro in July 1997.

In 1993, J teamed up with Inoran and X Japan guitarist Hide to form the group M*A*S*S. Their only material released was the song "Frozen Bug" on the sampler album Dance 2 Noise 004, which was later remixed by Hide and put on his 1994 debut solo album Hide Your Face. At the end of 1996, Luna Sea announced they would be taking a one-year break for the members to pursue solo careers. J later explained that some members wanted to start solo activities, while others did not as they felt they should all be focusing on the band, and the resulting conflict is what resulted in the one year limit. He was one of those against, and had never thought of being a solo artist before because he always preferred bands. Because he felt the public no longer thought of Luna Sea as a rock band due to their popularity, J said that he wanted to play the type of music he grew up listening to in his solo career and express his own view of rock. J signed with Universal Music Group as a solo artist. On selecting his band members, he explained that he recruited Scott Garrett on drums because he is a huge fan of The Cult, and Takashi Fujita of Doom on guitar because he wanted to play with a guitarist who plays heavy riffs. His first single, "Burn Out", was released on June 25, 1997, and contained a cover of Blondie's hit song "Call Me". His first album, Pyromania, was released on July 24 and reached number 9 on the Oricon chart. Recorded in Los Angeles with Joe Barresi as engineer, it features Shinya on "Back Line Beast", Billy Duffy on "Pyromania" and Slash on "But You Said I'm Useless" as guests. Needing a second guitarist to go on tour, Franz Stahl of Scream later explained he just happened to be in the right place at the right time as he knew Garrett and was hanging around during the recording of the album. J gave his first three concerts, titled Ignite, at Club Quattro venues between July 7 and 10, before the Pyromania Tour '97 was held from August 10 to September 1. Stahl described the tour as "total Beatlemania", with fans frequently chasing him and Garrett down streets. When Luna Sea's one-year hiatus was up, J had no intention of returning to his solo career. In 1999, he remixed Zilch's song "Electric Cucumber" for their remix album Bastard Eyes.

J said the way he decided to cope with Luna Sea's December 2000 disbandment and console their fans, was by touring right away, even if some people felt it was inappropriate or made them suspect he was the reason for the break up. Beginning in January 2001, he performed and toured with Zilch and South Korean singer Youjeen as part of the Fire Wire 2001 concerts and tour that he organized. The concerts also featured The Cult, Loaded and Steve Jones. J's Igniter #081 EP was released in Taiwan and South Korea on July 18, 2002, followed by its Japanese version, Crack Tracks, on August 21. The tracklist varies per country, but all songs include English lyrics, at a time when it was still illegal to sell music with Japanese lyrics in South Korea. J's second solo album, Blood Muzik, was released on December 27. Between 2001 and 2002, J contributed to Zilch's singles and their album Skyjin, and did much arranging, writing and composing for Youjeen. In 2002, he played bass on the track "I Hate You" from Tomoyasu Hotei's album Scorpio Rising, while Hotei remixed J's song "Perfect World" for the "Go Crazy" single. From July 8 to 12, J held the first installment in his "5 Days" concert event series, which are composed of five consecutive concerts at a venue, with the first four days featuring different guest acts. This first installment, 5 Crazy 5, took place at Shibuya-AX and featured Youjeen, the Polysics, Dice and Fullgain. J released Unstoppable Drive, his third solo album, on November 27. His January 4, 2003, concert at the Nippon Budokan was the first in the venue's history to be standing only, something he specifically requested and accomplished after a long negotiation period with the venue's staff. J participated in the making of South Korean musician Seo Taiji's January 2004 album 7th Issue, before releasing his own album Red Room on May 19. His second 5 Days event, Red or Dead, took place at Shibuya-AX in September and featured Lunkhead, Fuzzy Control, Dice and Youjeen's band Cherry Filter.

In 2005, Franz Stahl, who had been with J's backing band since it was formed in 1997, was replaced by Fullscratch guitarist Masasucks in July. Starting with the single "Break" on November 9, 2005, J has been signed to Blowgrow, a division of Avex Group. That December, he released his fifth album Glaring Sun, and covered Buck-Tick's song "Iconoclasm" for their tribute album Parade -Respective Tracks of Buck-Tick-. In 2006, J founded the record label Inferno Records, which released a single by the band Rottengraffty. He also played bass on "Pursuit" as part of Aggressive Dogs / Death Note Allstars "N-Crew", a collaboration with other musicians for the June 2006 album Death Note Tribute. J has hosted the monthly Bay FM 78 radio show Mozaiku Night ~No. 1 Music Factory~ since January 11, 2007. After releasing the album Urge on March 14, J celebrated the tenth anniversary of his solo career in October with J 10th Anniversary Special Live Shibuya-AX 5 Days All of Urge. It featured Snail Ramp, Merry, 9mm Parabellum Bullet, Rottengraffty and Sasurai Maker. On December 24, 2007, J reunited with Luna Sea for the God Bless You ~One Night Dejavu~ concert at the Tokyo Dome. J released his seventh album Ride on April 23, 2008. Luna Sea reunited again to perform at the Hide Memorial Summit on May 4, along with X Japan, Oblivion Dust, Rize and many more. In April 2009, J announced that he had gotten married in his fan club-issued Pyro Magazine Vol. 21. After four years, Masasucks left J's band in May 2009 and Kazunori Mizuguchi of Nunchaku joined as guitarist. J released two mini-albums that year, Stars from the Broken Night on August 5 and Here Comes Nameless Sunrise on December 16, before holding the White Night Screamer tour, which began on December 18 and ran until January 23, 2010.

=== 2010–present: Luna Sea reunion and continued solo career ===
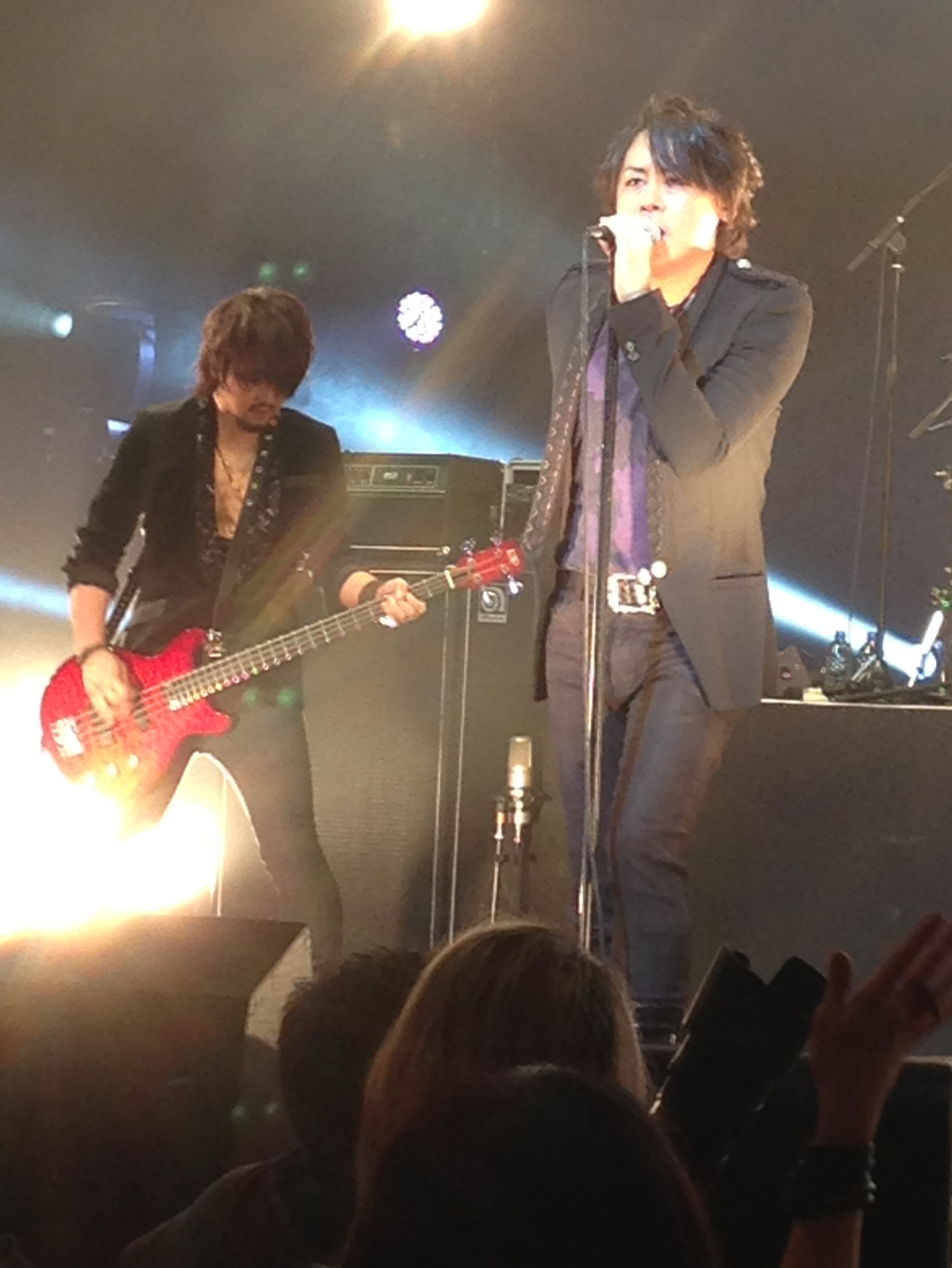
J and Ryuichi performing with Luna Sea in Singapore, 2013

In May 2010, J held his first Dessert Flame Frequency concerts, which are acoustic only. That August, he appeared with the other members of Luna Sea at a press conference in Hong Kong, where they officially announced their reunion and their 20th Anniversary World Tour Reboot -to the New Moon-. To celebrate his 14th anniversary as a solo artist, J released the self-cover album Fourteen -The Best of Ignitions- on January 26, 2011. March 8 saw the debut of Pink Spider, a musical based on and featuring Hide's music, which J performed a supporting role in. The production ran from March 8 to the 27 at the Tokyo Globe Theater and was then brought to Fukuoka, Kobe, Nagoya, Niigata, Sendai, and Sapporo in April. From May 5 to 9, J held his 5 Days event at Shibuya-AX. Set Fire Get Higher -Fire Higher 2011- featured acts such as Mass of the Fermenting Dregs, Avengers in Sci-Fi, A Flood of Circle, Pay Money to My Pain and Masasucks' new band The Hiatus. J released On Fire, his eighth album, on March 21, 2012. The final day of his -On Fire- [Add Fuel to The Fire] tour on September 2 also featured My First Story and The Mirraz, and saw J's former guitarists Masasucks and Franz Stahl reunite with him as guests during his encore.

On August 10, 2013, J began a series of concerts titled Tokyo 10 Days!! - 5 Months a Blaze -, which had him performing two consecutive nights in five locations, in the span of five months. This was in addition to his nationwide Believe in Yourself tour from August 24 to October 27, which included 11 shows in 10 different cities. The band also participated at the year's Rock in Japan Festival and Monster Bash. J released his ninth studio album, Freedom No. 9, on October 23, 2013. Masasucks appears on the album as a guest, as does drummer Masuo Arimatsu from Back Drop Bomb. The album was later released on vinyl on April 19, 2014, for Record Store Day. When Shibuya-AX was announced to be closing, the staff requested J, the artist with the most performances at the venue, perform one last time. The concerts entitled -Thank You AX!! Good Bye AX!!- were held on May 3 and 4, 2014. With the venue's closure, J moved his 5 Days event to Akasaka Blitz that November with Like a Fire Whirl. It featured acts such as Alexandros, Totalfat and AA=. Takashi Fujita, J's backing guitarist since he launched his solo career in 1997, retired from his position at the end of the year to reform Doom, and Masasucks officially returned in his place. After a short spring tour titled Zero, J released Eternal Flames on September 2, 2015. The Live on Instinct tour began three days later and ended on October 10. It turned out to be Scott Garrett's last as he left the band after 18 years with J. Two Dessert Flame Frequency concerts were held on December 9 and 10 with Hiroshi Kido of Unkie on drums, while the Light Up the Eternal Flames tour began on December 30 with Sambu of the band Namba69 on drums. The tour eventually saw the drummer position filled by Arimatsu officially joining J's band.

To celebrate his 20th anniversary, J held the 10 Days of Glory -10 Counts for Destruction- concert series throughout October 2016. Each date featured another act, such as Nothing's Carved in Stone, Lynch., Knock Out Monkey or Minus(-). The compilation album J 20th Anniversary Best Album ＜1997-2017＞ W.U.M.F. released on March 22, 2017, contains two discs, the first composed of fast rock songs and the second of mid-tempo songs and ballads, with six of the tracks featuring newly re-recorded vocals. The tracklist was created based on a fan vote and disc one features the new song "One Reason", while the second disc contains a re-recording of "Across the Night", which was the most requested song. J's 20th anniversary tour saw twelve concerts between May 5 and June 25, with three additional dates held at Akasaka Blitz on August 11 to 13. The end of 2017 saw J's first Hōkama Daibōnenkai (放火魔 大暴年会) concert at Tsutaya O-East on December 30, which featured Doom, The Band Apart and Takagicho Missiles. In 2018, his Rise Above tour took place from June 30 to August 12. That year's Hōkama Daibōnenkai concert on December 30 featured Fujita, Aki of Sid, Garlic Boys and Zantö. A tour titled The Beginning ran from July 6, 2019, to August 12. During it, J released his eleventh studio album, Limitless, on July 24. 2019's Hōkama Daibōnenkai show on December 30 included Ningen Isu and Suspended 4th, and guests such as Pata and Nobuaki Okamoto of The Telephones.

J collaborated with Takanori Nishikawa on the songs "Real×Eyez", the theme song he composed for the Kamen Rider Zero-One TV series, and "Another Daybreak", the theme song he composed for the Kamen Rider Reiwa: The First Generation film. Both tracks were released as a single on January 22, 2020. The two musicians collaborated again on "A.I. ∴ All Imagination" for 2020's Kamen Rider Zero-One the Movie: Real×Time. 2020's 5 Days event, Thank You to All Mother Fuckers, was supposed to take place at Akasaka Blitz from August 8 to 12 and feature acts like Nishikawa, 9mm Parabellum Bullet, Lynch. and Braham. However, due to the COVID-19 pandemic in Japan, it was changed to a single concert by J on the 12th, which was performed without an audience and streamed online. J released the album Lightning on November 3, 2021. A national tour was initially planned to support the album, but this was changed to a four-date tour with reserved seating only due to the continued pandemic. The Lightning tour was eventually held in 2022, from March 5 to April 23. Also in 2022, J celebrated the 25th anniversary of his solo career and the 20th anniversary of his fan club with special concerts. For the former, Pyromania is Back which took place on July 24, he recreated his setlist from 1997.

J's Endless Summer 2023 °C tour was held from July 1 to August 12, and followed by Fall Incredible 4 Nights between October 28 and November 24. In 2024, J gave four spring concerts titled Stand at the Summit, followed by two fall shows under the name Brand New Flame. His Hōkama Daibōnenkai show on December 30 featured acts such as Maykidz and Waive, and guests such as Hazuki and DJ Higo-vicious. The musician's thirteenth album Blazing Notes was released on January 29, 2025. Its tour, Blazing Days, ran from January 11 to March 15. Arimatsu was unable to participate in the four additional dates held in April, and recommended Louie Kato as his stand-in on drums. Rittor Music published J's autobiography, My Way, on August 12, 2025, his 55th birthday. It was the company's third best-selling book of the year, and received five reprints as of February 2026. Two special concerts commemorating the birthday were held at Shibuya O-East on August 12 and 13, and the tour Blazing Days II -Re Beast- was held from September 12 to October 12.

== Musicianship ==
J said that although the vocalist or guitarist is typically considered "the star" of a band, he wanted to change that idea. Rather than try to imitate another bass player, "I was desperately trying to find my own style. Bassline, stance, that sort of thing, and appearance too." Although self-taught, he cited jam sessions with Toshihiro Nara, bassist of Sonhouse and Sheena & The Rokkets, as major eye-opening experiences. J has no interest in music where the bass is loud and stands out, or in playing meaningless solos to grab attention. Instead, he wants to play phrases that anyone can play, but in a way that is cooler than everyone else; "even if it is simple, it is absolutely useless unless there is something cool in it". Gota Nishidera wrote that the biggest difference between Luna Sea and their contemporaries was their rhythm section, who created a "rhythm revolution" in Japanese rock with their exquisite control and ability to freely manipulate silence and explosion. J uses guitar picks and previously hated fingerpicking. But in 2018, the musician said he is now able to find the tone he wants for medium and slow songs with his fingers. When composing songs, the bass is the last thing he thinks about. Even if the song is about a serious issue, J has said that he does not want to create music that makes people think deeply; "I want to create entertainment that destroys all negativity. [I want] music that makes you laugh off everything and say, 'It doesn't matter', no matter what happens, with an arrow pointing forward." J also said a key aspect in his songs is balance; "I don't like it when only the thoughts and words are heavy, or when only the sound becomes excessively heavy. [...] I want a song where everything is in absolute balance."

Many of J's song and album titles and lyrics evoke fire or flames. This originated with the first song of his first solo album, both of which are titled "Pyromania" after a prank he pulled as a young boy. (Note: Technically the first track on Pyromania is the short instrumental "#1 (I Love That!!)", but second track "Pyromania" is the first proper song.) "I created this song with the hope that I can ignite many things with this sound." Because such words are associated with heat, he finds them perfect for the expressions he wants to convey. He explained; "even in everyday conversations, when you're talking with friends, you get excited, right? I feel like that's 'burning' somehow. I think it's an essential element of everyday life. When you find something that makes you excited, I think that person shines incredibly brightly, and how wonderful it would be if you could fill your entire days with such moments. I think we listen to music, go to live shows, and listen to rock music to feel good in search of such moments." J also often uses religious imagery in his work. This has nothing to do with his own beliefs, he is simply interested in religious illustrations and books and the culture surrounding it. For example, his frequent use of images of Maria stems from his love of automobiles, as she is frequently seen in the lowrider car scene.

J ranked tenth on Bass Magazine's January 2025 list of the 100 Greatest Bassists, as voted on by professional bass players. Coinciding with the list, he came in first place in the social media poll conducted by the magazine on X via a hashtag. Musicians that have cited J as an influence include, Natchin of Siam Shade, Ni~ya of Nightmare, DuelJewel's Natsuki, Totalfat bassist Shun, Hiyori Isshiki of Kiryū, Xaa-Xaa's Reiya, and Yu-ki of Noisemaker. Reita of The Gazette, RxYxO of Coldrain, and Nob of My First Story have all listed J as one of their favorite bassists. Back Number's Kazuya Kojima started playing bass because of J.

== Equipment ==
J was endorsed by ESP Guitars for 28 years until May 2019. His many signature model bass guitars with the brand, most of which had his trademark phrase "WAKE UP! MOTHER FUCKER" painted on them, have sold over 50,000 copies. J explained that he originally handwrote the English words on one of his bass guitars before Luna Sea's April 1995 concerts at Hibiya Open-Air Concert Hall, to "encourage myself and to encourage everyone who came to my concerts, but at some point it became like my catchphrase". The abbreviation "W.U.M.F." is also used in relation to the bassist, such as in the title of his 2017 compilation album. His signature models include the J-MF-I and J-TVB-V, both of which also had more affordable versions produced by ESP's Grassroots and Edwards brands. Before his contract with ESP expired, the special event "J × ESP 28 Years Trajectory ~28 Toshi no Kiseki~" followed J's spring tour displaying his signature models and other goods.

At the end of May 2019, it was announced that J had signed an endorsement contract with Fender. They gave him a custom model built to his specifications based on the Fender Precision Bass. Based on that specific custom model that he had been using, J's signature model was released on August 12, 2020, as part of their Heavy Relic line, which gives an aged and heavily played look. It has a reverse headstock, a 1.65 inch nut width, a one-piece maple neck, and an ash body. Its Black Gold paint job was modeled after a 1970s motorcycle helmet he owns. On November 25, 2022, Fender released a J signature model through their Made in Japan line. In addition to the Black Gold color, a limited Champagne Gold color was only available online and was named after J's song "Champagne Gold Super Market". Very similar to the previous model, it does not have the worn appearance and has a neck plate with Maria engraved on it. J said the Black Gold was his go-to model as its perfect for eight-beat and fast-paced songs, while the Champagne Gold has a slightly fatter sound making it great for slow-tempo songs and ballads. A King's Red Sparkle model with a Heavy Relic finish will receive a limited release in October 2026. A PJ variant, which adds a Jazz Bass pickup and features an alder body instead of the regular's ash, will be released at the same time. Regardless of endorsements, J uses various different brands and models of bass guitars when recording.

J has used images of Maria on the grilles of his guitar amplifiers for decades. In February 2021, he became the first Japanese musician to have a signature model amplifier with Ampeg. The Micro-VR Limited Edition J model is based on the SVT-810E, which J has used for years, is 200 watts, 83 centimeters tall, has two 10-inch cabinets, a red Tolex finish and features Maria on its grille.

== Support band ==
Current members

- Kazunori Mizuguchi (溝口和紀) – guitar 2009–present (Nunchaku, Superhype)
- Masasucks – guitar 2005–2009, 2015–present (The Hiatus, Fullscratch, Radiots)
- Masuo Arimatsu (有松益男) – drums 2015–present (Kemuri, Back Drop Bomb, Pontiacs)

Former members

- Franz Stahl – guitar 1997, 2001–2005 (Scream, Wool, Foo Fighters)
- Takashi "CBGB" Fujita (藤田高志) – guitar 1997, 2001–2014 (Doom)
- Scott Garrett – drums 1997, 2001–2015 (The Cult, Dag Nasty, Wired All Wrong)

== Discography ==
=== Studio albums ===
- Pyromania (July 24, 1997), Oricon Albums Chart Peak Position: #9
- Blood Muzik (December 27, 2001) #34
- Unstoppable Drive (November 27, 2002) #18
- Red Room (May 19, 2004) #24
- Glaring Sun (December 7, 2005) #39
- Urge (March 14, 2007) #39
- Ride (April 23, 2008) #36
- On Fire (March 21, 2012) #24
- Freedom No. 9 (October 23, 2013) #31
- Eternal Flames (September 2, 2015) #15
- Limitless (July 24, 2019) #33
- Lightning (November 3, 2021) #17
- Blazing Notes (January 29, 2025) #18

=== EPs and mini-albums ===
- Igniter #081 (July 18, 2002; Korean and Taiwanese versions of Crack Tracks)
- Crack Tracks (August 21, 2002) #28
- Go with the Devil -Crack Tracks II- (July 9, 2003) #26
- Stars from the Broken Night (August 5, 2009) #20
- Here Comes Nameless Sunrise (December 16, 2009) #36

=== Live albums ===
- The Live -All of Urge- (December 19, 2007) #62

=== Compilation albums ===
- Blast List -The Best of- (December 22, 2004) #43
- Fourteen -The Best of Ignitions- (January 26, 2011, self-cover) #28
- J 20th Anniversary Best Album ＜1997-2017＞ W.U.M.F. (March 22, 2017) #41

=== Singles ===
- "Burn Out" (June 25, 1997), Oricon Singles Chart Peak Position: #6
- "But You Said I'm Useless" (October 22, 1997) #31
- "Perfect World" (July 25, 2001) #19
- "Go Crazy" (March 20, 2002) #23
- "Feel Your Blaze" (October 30, 2002) #17
- "Nowhere" (April 14, 2004) #18
- "Get Ready" (July 6, 2005) #32
- "Break" (November 9, 2005) #22
- "Fly Away/Squall" (July 12, 2006) #43
- "Twister" (February 7, 2007) #24
- "Walk Along ~Infinite Mix~" (August 22, 2007) #42
- "Reckless" (March 19, 2008) #31
- "Now and Forever" (June 30, 2018; limited single)
- "Real×Eyez" (January 22, 2020; credited to J×Takanori Nishikawa) #8
- "My Heaven/A Thousand Dreams" (August 12, 2020; limited single)

=== Home videos ===
- Pyromania Tour'97 ~Crime Scene~ (VHS: October 22, 1997; DVD: December 18, 2002)
- Film The Blood Muzik 80min. Riot (June 26, 2002), Oricon DVDs Chart Peak Position: #34
- The Judgment Day -2003.1.4. Live at Budokan- (March 26, 2003) #51
- Blast List -The Clips- (December 22, 2004) #158
- Crazy Crazy ~Live & Document~ (March 26, 2006) #59
- Crazy Crazy II ~Road on Flames~ (December 6, 2006) #48
- Live and Let Ride (2009; fan club-only)
- Crazy Crazy III -With The Unfading Fire- (March 17, 2010) #49
- The Method 2010 / Dessert Flame Frequency (December 24, 2010; fan club-only)
- Film -The Fourteen- J 14th Anniversary Special DVD (April 2012; fan club-only)
- J 15th Anniversary DVD & Blu-ray -Complete Clips- (November 13, 2012) #220, Oricon Blu-rays Chart Peak Position: #84
- Crazy Crazy IV -The Flaming Freedom- (March 26, 2014) #147, #121
- Crazy Crazy V -The Eternal Flames- (March 16, 2016) #99, #57
- J 20th Anniversary Live Film [W.U.M.F.] -Tour Final at EX Theater Roppongi 2017.6.25- (November 15, 2017) #45, #17
- J Live Streaming Akasaka Blitz 5 Days Final -Thank You to All Mother Fuckers- (February 10, 2021) #38, #16
- J 25th Anniversary Special Live Pyromania 2022 -Pyromania is Back- 2022.7.24 Zepp Diver City Tokyo (December 2022; fan club-only)
- Crazy Crazy VI (January 29, 2025; included only in limited editions of Blazing Notes)

=== Other work ===
- M*A*S*S; Dance 2 Noise (1993) – "Frozen Bug"
- Nav Katze; Out (1994) – bass on "Arabian Night" (アラビアの夜)
- Hide; Hide Your Face (1994) – composer (as part of M*A*S*S) on "Frozen Bug '93 (Diggers Version)"
- Hide; Hide Presents Mix Lemoned Jelly All Night Club Event Red Package Green Package (1997) – "Lie Lie Lie"
- Zilch; Bastard Eyes (1999) – remixed "Electric Kyōdai Jingi Cucumber" (ELECTRIC 兄弟仁義 CUCUMBER)
- Zilch; "Mimizuzero" (2001) – bass on "Mimizuzero (Rock Kingpin)"
- Youjeen; "Hey Jerks" (2001) – arrangement & bass on all tracks; lyricist on tracks #1 & 3; composer on track #2
- Youjeen; "Someday" (2001) – arrangement, bass, guitar, lyricist and composer on all tracks
- Zilch; "Charlie's Children" (2001) – bass on tracks 1 & 3
- Youjeen; The Doll (2001) – arrangement & bass on all tracks except #12; guitar on tracks #1, 4, 6, 8–11; lyricist on all tracks except #4, 10, & 12; composer on all tracks except #2, 3, 5, 7 & 12
- Zilch; Skyjin (2001) – bass on tracks 1–3, 5, 8, 11 & 13
- Youjeen; "Beautiful Days" (2001) – arrangement & bass on all tracks; lyricist on tracks #1 & 2; composer & guitar on tracks # 1 & 3
- Tomoyasu Hotei; Scorpio Rising (2002) – bass on "I Hate You"
- Youjeen; Fly (2002)
- Dice; One (2003) – producer
- Seo Taiji; 7th Issue (2004) – bass on "Robot"
- Various artists; Parade -Respective Tracks of Buck-Tick- (2005) – "Iconoclasm"
- Various artists; Death Note Tribute (2006) – "Pursuit"
- The Braincase; The Braincase (2008) – bass on tracks #3, 4, 7, 9 & 11
- Buck-Tick; Buck-Tick Fest 2007 On Parade (2008) – "Iconoclasm"
- Aggressive Dogs; Shishi no Gotoku (獅子の如く) (2008) – bass on "Pursuit"
- Aggressive Dogs; Aoki Garou (蒼き餓狼) (2009) – bass on "Seize the Day"
- Various artists; Ma Waga (真我) (2009) – bass on "Aoki Garou" (蒼き餓狼-Aoki Garou-)
- Various artists; Jack Rocks (2010) – "Miss Dizzy"
- Tokyo Girls' Style; "Get The Star / Last Forever" (2013) – composer on tracks 1 & 2
- Various artists; hide Tribute VII -Rock Spirits- (2013) – "Flame"
- Various artists; We are Disco!!! ~Tribute to the Telephones~ (2015) – "Love & Disco"
- Minus(-); G (2015) – guest vocals on "Peepshow"
- Nanase Aikawa; Now or Never (2016) – composer on "Flash of Light"
- Lynch.; Sinners (2017) – bass on "Trigger"; appears in its music video
