= Inoran =

Japanese musician and singer-songwriter (born 1970)

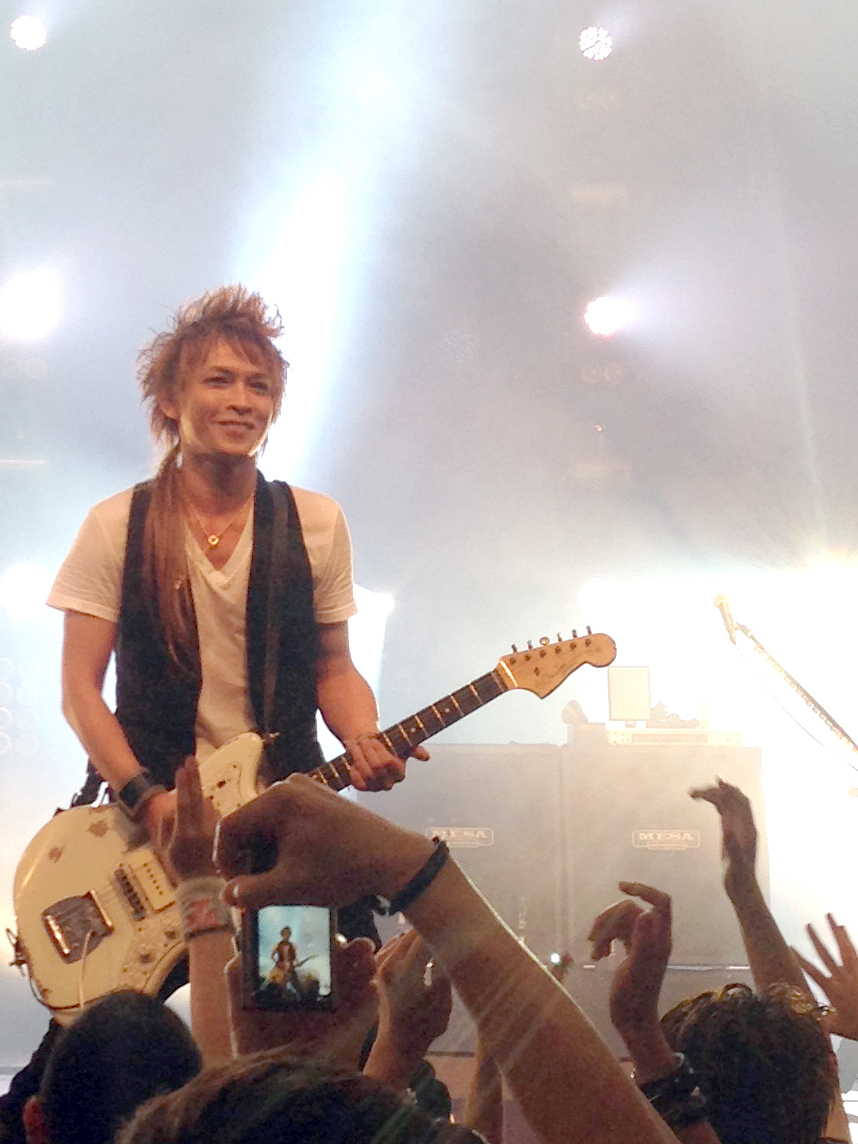
- Inoran performing with Luna Sea in Singapore, 2013

Background information
- Born: Kiyonobu Inoue (井上 清信); September 29, 1970 (age 56); Hadano, Kanagawa, Japan
- Genre: Alternative rock
- Occupations: Musician; singer-songwriter
- Instruments: Vocals; guitar
- Years active: 1986–present
- Label: King
- Member of: Luna Sea; Tourbillon; Fake?
- Website: inoran.org

Kiyonobu Inoue (Japanese: 井上 清信, Hepburn: Inoue Kiyonobu; born September 29, 1970), better known exclusively by his stage name Inoran, is a Japanese musician and singer-songwriter. He is best known as the rhythm guitarist and co-founder of the rock band Luna Sea since 1986. He started his solo career in 1997. Luna Sea disbanded in 2000, and he formed Fake? with Oblivion Dust vocalist Ken Lloyd a year later. In 2005, he left Fake? and founded Tourbillon with Luna Sea vocalist Ryuichi Kawamura and Hiroaki Hayama. Inoran rejoined Luna Sea when they reunited in 2010, and in 2012 formed Muddy Apes with Taka Hirose and Dean Tidey of Feeder, and 8otto's vocalist Maeson. He rejoined Fake? in 2026. In 2011, Inoran became the first Japanese musician to have a signature model guitar with Fender.

== Early life ==
From about fourth grade until sixth, Inoran was obsessed with baseball. He did not listen to any popular music until he saw a music program on Television Kanagawa in his first year of junior high school. The first record he ever bought was Colour by Numbers, followed by Van Halen and Quiet Riot albums. Inspired, he began playing his father's classical guitar, but wanted an electric one. So he bought a red Stratocaster-like guitar and started a band in his second year of junior high. His interest in Western music coincided with his meeting J, who asked to borrow his copy of Howard Jones' album Human's Lib. J was a better guitarist than Inoran at the time, and taught him to play. The following year, Inoran began listening to independent Japanese bands and attending their concerts, such as 44 Magnum and D'erlanger's first concert with Kyo on vocals. He also wrote his first song that year. J and Inoran specifically chose a high school that had a light music club because they did not know anyone as passionate about music as themselves, but were disappointed to learn that they were already more skilled than their seniors. Although he played in bands throughout high school, Inoran said he did not devote his life to music until he graduated. He estimated that, if you include those done for fun and one-offs for school festivals, he was in about 10 bands in his school years. The drummer of one of these was the younger sister of Sugizo.

== Career ==
=== 1986–2009: Luna Sea, solo debut, Fake? and Tourbillon ===
In middle school through high school, Inoran became good friends with J, and they formed a band called Lunacy in 1986. In 1991, they changed their name to Luna Sea and released their first album. They went on to become very successful, having sold more than 10 million certified units in Japan, and are considered one of the most influential bands in the visual kei movement. In 2003, HMV Japan ranked Luna Sea at number 90 on their list of the 100 most important Japanese pop acts.

In 1993, Inoran and J teamed up with X Japan guitarist Hide to form the group M*A*S*S. Their only material released was the song "Frozen Bug" on the sampler Dance 2 Noise 004 (the song would later be remixed by Hide and put on his debut solo album Hide Your Face). When Luna Sea took a brief break in 1997, Inoran signed with King Records and began a solo career. His first single, "Sou", was released on September 25, 1997. The following month his debut album, also titled Sou, was released on October 22. Co-produced by DJ Krush, Inoran does not sing on the record (except the title track), instead it features several different female vocalists, such as Anneli Drecker and Alison Evelyn. Musically, the album features trip hop and hip-hop breakbeats. When Luna Sea disbanded in 2000, Inoran released his second album Fragment in July 2001. He then formed Fake? in late 2001 with former Oblivion Dust vocalist Ken Lloyd. After four studio albums and one mini-album, Inoran left Fake? in October 2005, citing musical differences with Lloyd. However, he had already announced the formation of his next band in May; Tourbillon with Luna Sea vocalist Ryuichi Kawamura and D-Loop keyboardist Hiroaki Hayama.

After a five year break in solo activities, Inoran released his third studio album Photograph in the summer of 2006. After releasing Niraikanai in July 2007, he performed many live concerts and released the concert DVD Tour 2007 Determine along with The Best compilation album, which collects his favorite songs selected by himself and his fan-club. The album also features the new song "I Swear". On December 24, 2007, Inoran reunited with Luna Sea to play a one-night only concert in front of an audience of around 45,000 people at the Tokyo Dome. One more reunion would happen again at the Hide Memorial Summit on May 4, 2008. After releasing two studio albums, Tourbillon dissipated in 2008.

Inoran released his first official book, Monophonic, in March 2008. That July he performed overseas for the first time at the Formoz Festival in Taiwan and the Incheon Pentaport Rock Festival in South Korea. On September 21, he performed at D'erlanger's Abstinence's Door #002 event, along with Merry and heidi. His fifth original album Apocalypse was released on September 24. The tour for the album, entitled Butterfly Effect, incorporated an international extension to perform overseas again, this time in Hong Kong in November, before the tour finale back in Japan, he released his first instrumental album Shadow on December 24, 2008; it includes the title track for the movie A Symmetry. Inoran performed on October 25 as part of the two-day V-Rock Festival '09.

=== 2010–present: Reunions, Muddy Apes and continued solo career ===
In May 2010, Inoran and Orange Range guitarist Naoto created and released the song "Love For..." for the victims of the 2010 Haiti earthquake. In August, he appeared with the other members of Luna Sea at a press conference in Hong Kong, where they officially announced their reunion and their 20th Anniversary World Tour Reboot -to the New Moon-. On September 19, Inoran joined British rock band Feeder on stage at the Tokyo Unit for a cover of the Nirvana track "Breed". Feeder's bass player Taka Hirose then played on Inoran's next single, October 2011's "Hide and Seek".

Inoran released the album Teardrop on March 30, 2011, and went on tour in support of it. In April, "Love For..." was offered for download once again. This time with the proceeds donated to aid reconstruction of the area damaged by the 2011 Tōhoku earthquake and tsunami. On September 21, Inoran's first album Sou was re-released with a new version of the title track, the bonus track "The Agenda", which was a B-side on his debut single and features American hip-hop artist Black Thought, and a DVD of the promotional video for "Sou".

Inoran appeared in the music video for Kiyoharu's May 2012 single "The Sun". The following month, he teamed up with Taka Hirose once again, as well as Feeder's support guitarist Dean Tidey and 8otto's vocalist Maeson, to form the band Muddy Apes. Their debut album, Crush It, was released in Japan by King Records and digitally in Europe by Bishi Bishi on September 5. Inoran's album Dive Youth, Sonik Dive was released on June 27, 2012, and includes "Lemontune", a song originally by Fake?. Anna Tsuchiya provides additional vocals on the song "No Options", the limited edition of the album comes with a DVD and a 12-inch vinyl record with "No Options - Mirrorless", a version of the song which Inoran sings himself. It was supported with a nationwide Japanese tour that also celebrated his 15th anniversary as a solo artist. On August 31 in Stockholm, he kicked off his first European tour, Seven Samurais, which took him to Vienna, Cologne, Hamburg, Venice and Milan, and ended on September 16 in Paris.

Inoran returned to Fake? for one night on February 23, 2013, for the concert Fake? -Live Decade-, his first performance with Ken Lloyd since he left the group in 2005. July saw the release of Muddy Apes' second album, Fairy Dirt Nº5. On August 16, 2013, Inoran performed at Angelo's Intersection of Dogma event, alongside other acts such as heidi., lynch. and Mucc. Inoran released his ninth studio album, Beautiful Now, on August 26, 2015. It includes a cover of Hide's "Pink Spider" and was followed by a nationwide tour in September. Tourbillon reunited for a 10th anniversary concert at the Tokyo International Forum on November 27, 2015, and a three-date tour at different Zepp venues throughout December. Muddy Apes' third album Faraway So Close was released in June 2016, while Tourbillon's third followed that October. In 2017, Inoran teamed up with Teru, Hisashi, Pierre Nakano (Ling Tosite Sigure) and Ery (Raglaia) to cover "Lullaby" by D'erlanger for the D'erlanger Tribute Album ~Stairway to Heaven~.

Due to the COVID-19 pandemic in Japan, Inoran recorded his next three studio albums at home; September 2020's Libertine Dreams, February 2021's Between the World and Me, and October 2021's Any Day Now. His first tour in three years, Back to Rock'N Roll, ended in the fall of 2022. Earlier that June, Inoran released the acoustic live album In My Oasis. It was recorded at Billboard Live Yokohama that April as part of the Billboard Session concert series he had been performing since 2019. Between 2022 and 2023, Inoran was a support guitarist for Kōji Kikkawa on his Over the 9 tour. After seven years, Tourbillon reunited again in 2023 to celebrate their 20th anniversary with concerts and a new song.

In September 2025, Inoran released Niraikanai -Rerecorded-. In an interview with Mandah Frénot for Visual Music Japan, Inoran emphasized that the album, a re-imagining of his 2007 album Niraikanai, was not an exercise in nostalgia but one of transformation, framing the return to his roots as a step toward new artistic growth. In November 2026, after 21 years, it was revealed that Inoran had officially rejoined Fake?.

== Personal life ==
Inoran has two younger brothers. He loved playing baseball when he was in school. The nickname Inoran came into existence when he was playing a baseball game; he hit the ball and a fan kept shouting "Ino! Run!!", which sounded like "Inoran". He was also said to be popular among girls in his school. Because of his good manner and looks, Tokyo Pop contacted him to be an idol but Inoran refused.

At age 16, Inoran became a big fan of Cipher, the guitarist and co-founder of the band D'erlanger, when he went to see one of their live concerts. Inoran said in an interview that Cipher is a person who has changed his life. Though Inoran is left-handed, he said he's more comfortable playing guitar with his right hand. He is also claustrophobic, this inspired him to compose the song "Claustrophobia", the B-side of Luna Sea's first single "Believe".

Inoran described himself as someone who is always moving forward, emphasizing both artistic creation and time spent with people. He highlighted the importance of environment and expressed a strong value for human connection.

== Equipment ==
Inoran has used many different guitars in his career, but is best known for playing the ESP and Fender brands. From the early 1990s to 2009, he was an endorser of ESP Guitars and had multiple signature models with them. His signature ESP models resembled Gibson Les Pauls, but had three single coil pickups; which Japanese music website Barks noted had never been done before. In 2004, ESP conducted a poll for their 30th anniversary on which of their out-of-production guitars were most popular; Inoran's ILP-II model, which also has a piezo pickup, was one of the top seven and was subsequently put back into temporary production. In December 2010, Inoran endorsed the American-based Fender Guitars. His first signature model with them, the black Inoran Jazzmaster #1 LTD, made its live debut at Luna Sea's December 4, 2010 concert in Los Angeles. The guitar, specifically its neck, is based on a 1959 Jazzmaster that Inoran had bought earlier in 2010. The following year, it was released in a limited amount of 50, making Inoran the first Japanese musician to have a signature model with Fender. A Japan-made version later received a general release in October 2019.

The aged Olympic White #2 LTD model followed in 2013, with a limited amount of 30. It was designed to contrast with #1. Among other changes, Inoran asked to have the slide switch installed horizontally because his hand would accidentally hit it when he played. The Inoran Road Worn Jazzmaster model was based on the #2 and released in October 2015. A special version of the Road Worn model was created in aged Lake Placid Blue to commemorate the 20th anniversary of Inoran's solo career. It was released on December 23, 2016, limited to 100 copies, and sold only at Ikebe Musical Instruments stores. Released in February 2025, Inoran's Desert Sand model was designed based on the original 1950s prototype of the Jazzmaster. Unlike his previous signature models, it features humbucker pickups.

== Support band ==
Inoran previously utilized many different musicians as support members in his solo career, including Personz guitarist Takeshi Honda, former hide with Spread Beaver bassist Chirolyn, Vamps bassist Ju-ken, former Dead End drummer Minato, and Theatre Brook drummer Takashi Numazawa. However, he has now been using the same line-up of musicians since 2012:

- u:zo – bass 2011–present (Rize, Yellow Fried Chickenz)
- Ryo Yamagata – drums 2011–present
- Yukio Murata – guitar 2012–present (My Way My Love)

== Discography ==
=== Albums ===
- Sou (想; October 22, 1997; CD or 12" vinyl, September 21, 2011; reissue), Oricon Albums Chart Peak Position: #16, #117 (reissue)
- Fragment (July 25, 2001) #16
- Photograph (September 26, 2006) #42
- Niraikanai (ニライカナイ; July 11, 2007) #43
- Apocalypse (September 24, 2008) #37
- Watercolor (March 10, 2010) #40
- Teardrop (March 30, 2011) #25
- Dive Youth, Sonik Dive (June 27, 2012) #38
- Somewhere (March 19, 2014, mini-album) #47
- Beautiful Now (August 26, 2015) #22
- Thank You (August 24, 2016) #27
- 2019 (August 7, 2019) #31
- Libertine Dreams (September 30, 2020) #36
- Between the World and Me (February 17, 2021) #40
- Any Day Now (October 20, 2021) #44

=== Remix albums ===
- Landscape of Fragment (November 21, 2001; CD, December 25, 2001; 12″ vinyl) #79 (CD)

=== Other albums ===
- The Best (January 23, 2008; compilation) #40
- Shadow (December 24, 2008; instrumental) #123
- Intense / Mellow (August 23, 2017; self-cover) #32
- In My Oasis Billboard Session (June 29, 2022; live album) #44
- Niraikanai -Rerecorded- (ニライカナイ -Rerecorded-; September 24, 2025; self-cover) #47

=== Singles ===
- "Sou" (想; September 25, 1997), Oricon Singles Chart Peak Position: #7
- "Won't Leave My Mind" (June 13, 2001) #15
- "Waves/Felicidad" (January 1, 2004; fan club limited)
- "Shike (時化)/Elements of Foundation" (September 17, 2009)

Inoran×Roen collaboration, limited CD and DVD release available at Inoran Live Tour 2009.

- "Hide and Seek" (October 5, 2011) #10
- "Something About You" (September 13, 2013, concert limited)

=== Home videos ===
- Won't Leave My Mind (August 8, 2001), Oricon DVDs Chart Peak Position: #19
- The Last Night (June 25, 2003) #90
- Another Room (April 26, 2005)
- Raize (September 26, 2006)
- Tour 2006 Photograph (March 7, 2007) #78
- Tour 2007 Determine (January 23, 2008) #62
- 2008 Butterfly Effect+ (June 10, 2009) #27
- Tour 2010 Watercolor (September 22, 2010) #73
- I'm Here (August 28, 2013) #48
- Tour 2015 -Beautiful Now- at EX Theater Roppongi (April 6, 2016) #21
- Sugizo vs Inoran Presents Best Bout ~L 2/5~ (April 26, 2017) #33
- Override (August 22, 2018) #26
- Inoran Tour 2019 Cowboy Puni-Shit Live in Tokyo (February 26, 2020), Oricon Blu-rays Chart Peak Position: #72
- Sugizo vs Inoran Presents Best Bout 2021 ~L 2/5~ (March 9, 2022) #38
- Inoran -Tokyo 5 Nights- Back to the Rock'N Roll (March 9, 2022) #45
- In My Oasis Billboard Session (December 14, 2022)

=== Books ===
- Monophonic (March 2008)

=== With Muddy Apes ===
- Crush It (2012)
- Fairy Dirt Nº5 (2013)
- Faraway So Close (2016)

=== Other work ===
- Olivia; "Sailing Free" (2009) - arranger on track 1
- Ever; Happiness Is... (2009) - composer, arranger, producer on track 1
- lynch.; Inferiority Complex (2012) - guitar on "Experience"
- lecca; lecca Live 2012 Jammin' the Empire @ Nippon Budokan (2009) - "Missing Ordinary", "Higher"
- Oldcodex; Oldcodex Live DVD "Contrast Silver" Tour Final (2013) - "Heaven"
- Ryuichi Kawamura; Beautiful Lie (2021) - composer, co-arranger on "Sing to You"
