= Singles (Luna Sea album) =

Compilation album by Luna Sea
- Released: December 17, 1997
- Length: 79:41 (total); 38:47 (CD 1); 40:54 (CD 2)
- Label: Universal
- Producer: Luna Sea

Luna Sea chronology
Style (1996)	Singles (1997)	Shine (1998)

Singles is the first compilation album by the Japanese rock band Luna Sea, released on December 17, 1997. It is a double album that collects all of their singles up to that point, with the A-sides on disc one, and the B-sides on disc two.

The album was the band's second consecutive number one on the Oricon Albums Chart, following 1996's Style, and charted for 27 weeks. It was the twentieth best-selling album of 1998, and is the band's best-selling album with more than 1.2 million copies sold it was certified Triple Platinum by the RIAJ. It was also one of the albums to win "Rock Album of the Year" at the 12th Japan Gold Disc Awards.

== Track listing ==
All music is composed by Luna Sea.

Disc 1: Singles
No.	Title	Length
1.	"Believe" (1993)	4:17
2.	"In My Dream (With Shiver)" (1993)	5:14
3.	"Rosier" (1994)	5:25
4.	"True Blue" (1994)	3:55
5.	"Mother" (1995)	5:35
6.	"Desire" (1995)	4:22
7.	"End of Sorrow" (1996)	4:24
8.	"In Silence" (1996)	5:35

Disc 2: Another Side of Singles
No.	Title	Length
9.	"Claustrophobia" (from "Believe")	5:36
10.	"Slave" (from "In My Dream (With Shiver)")	3:34
11.	"Rain" (from "Rosier")	5:32
12.	"Fallout" (from "True Blue")	6:58
13.	"Luv U" (from "Desire")	5:25
14.	"Twice" (from "End of Sorrow")	6:16
15.	"Ray" (from "In Silence")	7:33
