= Sugizo discography =

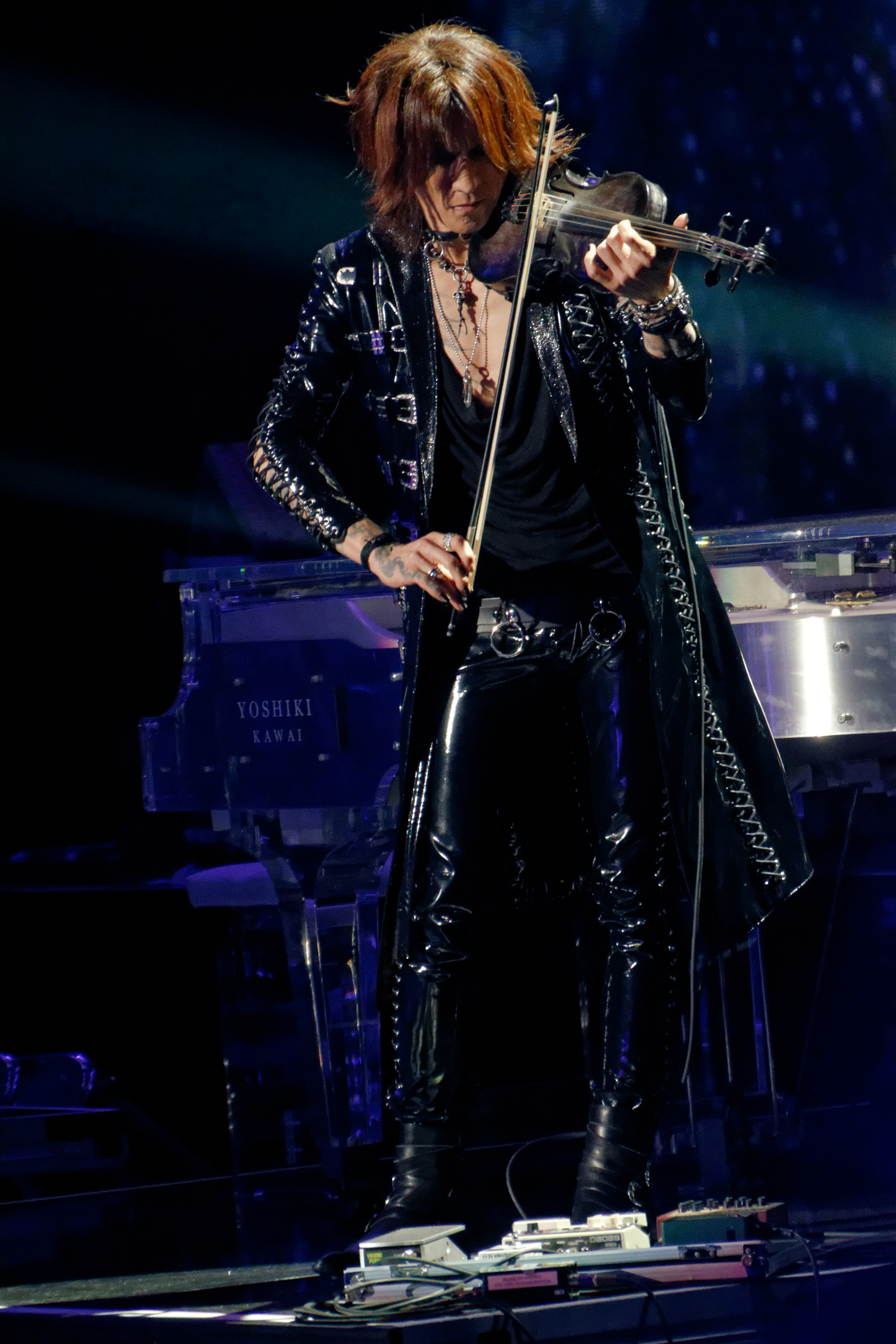
- Sugizo at Madison Square Garden with X Japan in 2014
- Studio albums: 8
- Soundtrack albums: 8
- Live albums: 2
- Compilation albums: 7
- Singles: 29
- Video albums: 8
- Remix albums: 7

The discography of Japanese musician Sugizo consists on eight studio albums and 29 singles as a solo artist. He has collaborated with many other artists.

== Studio albums ==
- Truth? (November 19, 1997), Oricon Peak Position: #12
- C:Lear (October 1, 2003) #56
- Flower of Life (December 14, 2011) #62
- Tree of Life (December 14, 2011) #69
- Oto (音; December 23, 2016) #132
- Oneness M (November 29, 2017) #23
- Love & Tranquility (愛と調和, Ai to Chōwa; December 23, 2020) #87
- The Voyage to The Higher Self (February 16, 2022) #125
  - Sugizo x Hataken
- Oneness F (2025)

== Remix albums ==
- Replicant Lucifer (August 27, 1997) #24
- Replicant Prayer (November 6, 1997) #54
- Replicant Truth？ (December 21, 1997)
- Spirituarise (December 5, 2007)
- Vesica Pisces (March 6, 2013) #227
- Replicants (October 25, 2017) #232
- Switched-On Oto (May 29, 2018) #202

== Compilation albums ==
- Sugizo meets Frank Zappa (December 22, 1999)
- Parallel Side of Soundtrack (November 14, 2001)
- Cosmoscape (July 23, 2008) #69
- Spiritual Classic Sugizo Selection (September 24, 2014) #133
- Spiritual Classic Sugizo Selection II (July 8, 2015) #123
- Cosmoscape II (December 15, 2018) #74
- The Complete Single Collection (November 23, 2022) #49

== Live albums ==
- Live in Tokyo (2020) #74
- And the Chaos is Killing Me (July 5, 2023)

== Soundtracks ==
- H・Art・Chaos ~Suichoku no Yume~ (H・ART・CHAOS 〜垂直の夢〜; December 31, 2001)
- Music from the Original Motion Picture Soundtrack (February 27, 2002) #80
- Silent Voice ~Acoustic Songs of Soundtrack~ (May 9, 2002)
- Nemuri Kyōshirō Burai-hikae Original Soundtrack (眠狂四郎無頼控 オリジナル・サウンドトラック; May 14, 2010)
- 7Doors ~Aohige Kō no Shiro~ Original Soundtrack (7DOORS〜青ひげ公の城〜 ORIGINAL SOUNDTRACK; May 30, 2012)
- Tokyo Decibels ~Original Motion Picture Soundtrack~ (May 17, 2017)
- Hyoen 2025: Kagamon no Yasha - Original Soundtrack (氷艶 hyoen 2025 -鏡紋の夜叉- オリジナル・サウンドトラック; June 10, 2026)
- Dark Machine: The Animation Original Soundtrack (December 9, 2026)

== Singles ==
- "Lucifer" (July 9, 1997) #8
- "A Prayer" (September 10, 1997) #7
- "Rest in Peace & Fly Away" (April 10, 2002) #46
  - Sugizo feat. bice
- "Super Love" (August 21, 2002) #42
  - Sugizo & the Spank Your Juice
- "Dear Life" (November 20, 2002) #47
  - Sugizo & the Spank Your Juice
- "No More Machine Guns Play the Guitar" (January 24, 2003) #50
  - Sugizo & the Spank Your Juice
- "Tell Me Why You Hide the Truth?" (December 16, 2009)
- "Messiah" (December 16, 2009)
- "Do-Funk Dance" (January 27, 2010)
- "Fatima" (January 27, 2010)
- "Prana" (February 24, 2010)
- "Dear Spiritual Life" (March 31, 2010)
- "No More Nukes Play the Guitar" (April 13, 2011)
- "The Edge" (April 13, 2011)
- "Miranda" (June 29, 2011)
  - Sugizo feat. MaZDA
- "Neo Cosmoscape" (July 27, 2011)
  - Remixed by System 7
- "Enola Gay" (August 15, 2011)
- "Pray for Mother Earth" (September 11, 2011)
  - Sugizo feat. Toshinori Kondo
- "Final of the Messiah" (August 29, 2012)
  - Remix by System 7
- "Super Love 2012" (September 11, 2012)
  - Sugizo feat. Coldfeet
- "Life on Mars?" (August 15, 2016)
- "Lux Aeterna" (September 30, 2016)
- "Raummusik" (October 31, 2016)
- "Meguriai" (めぐりあい; June 11, 2019)
  - Sugizo feat. Glim Spanky
- "Mizu no Hoshi e Ai wo Komete" (水の星へ愛をこめて; June 18, 2019)
  - Sugizo feat. KOM_I (Wednesday Campanella)
- "A Red Ray" (June 25, 2019)
  - Sugizo feat. miwa
- "Hikari no Hate" (光の涯; August 13, 2019)
  - Sugizo feat. Aina the End (BiSH)
- "Endless ~Toki o Koete~" (ENDLESS ～時を超えて～; May 18, 2020)
  - Sugizo feat. Maki Ohguro
- "Super Love 2024" (December 18, 2024)
  - Sugizo feat. Chole

== Videography ==
- A.D.2001 Final (November 27, 2002) #86
- Brilliant Days (January 11, 2005)
- Rise to Cosmic Dance (March 25, 2009) #109
- Stairway to The Flower of Life (October 24, 2012) #81
- Sugizo vs Inoran Presents Best Bout ~L 2/5~ (April 26, 2017) #33
- Unity for Universal Truth (September 17, 2018) #55 (DVD) / #45 (BD)
- Sugizo vs Inoran Presents Best Bout 2021 ~L 2/5~ (March 9, 2022)
- And the Chaos is Killing Me (July 5, 2023)

== Other discography ==
=== With The Flare ===
- "Inner Child" (August 25, 2004) #70
- "Uetico" (ウエティコ; December 1, 2004)
- "Positivity" (June 1, 2005) #104
- "Manatsu no Koibito" (真夏ノ恋人; August 31, 2005) #93
- The Flare (February 8, 2006) #95

=== With Juno Reactor ===
- Gods & Monsters (April 22, 2008)
- The Golden Sun of the Great East (April 24, 2013)

=== With X Japan ===
- "Scarlet Love Song" (June 8, 2011)
- "Jade" (June 28, 2011)
- "Born to Be Free" (November 6, 2015)
- "Angel" (July 28, 2023)

=== With Shag ===
- The Protest Jam (July 1, 2022) #74

== Session discography ==
- Issay; Flowers (1994) – violin on "Asamade Matenai"
- Media Youth; Spirit (1995)
- Tracy Huang; Crazy for Love (1998) – "So Near, yet so far Away - 咫尺天涯" composed and produced by Sugizo
- Glay; Pure Soul (1998) – guitar on "Fried Chicken and Beer"; "愁いのPrisoner" (2018) – as guitarist on "Yuuwaku", live recording from Lunatic Fest. 2018.
- d-kiku; Miniature Garden (1998) – violin on "Tamarisque", guitar on "Close", "Synapse" and "Sound of View", "Cross" composed by Sugizo
- Miu Sakamoto; Aquascape (1999) – "Internal", "Eternal" and "Awakening (Endo Mix)" composed by Sugizo
- D.I.E.; Progressive (1999)
- Miki Nakatani; "Chronic Love", "Frontier" (1999)
- Coldfeet; Flavors (1999)
- Redrum; "Redrum" (1999) – producer
- Miu Sakamoto; Dawn Pink (1999) – "Internal", "Eternal" and "The Eighth Colour " composed by Sugizo
- Tomoe Shinohara; Deep Sound Channel (1999) – "Voyage" composed and produced by Sugizo
- Vivian Hsu; Jiaban de Tianshi (2000) – "他她", "魔鬼愛奢侈的眼淚", "老夫婦", composed and produced by Sugizo
- Honeydip; Another Sunny Day (2000) – producer
- Paul Wong; Yellow Paul Wong (2001) – guitar on three tracks
- N.M.L. (No More Landmines); Zero Landmine (2001) – guitar
- Nicholas Tse; Jade Butterfly (2001) - “今天你生日”，“後遺”，“瘟疫”
- Inoran - Fragment - Erhu on track number 8 "艶".
- Red; "Saga" (2001) – producer
- Miu Sakamoto; "Sleep Away" (2002) – composed, arranged and produced by Sugizo
- Kiyoharu; Poetry (2004) – guitar on "Melancholy"
- Redrum; Second Circle (2004) – producer
- D'espairsRay; Born (2004) – violin on "Marry of the Blood"
- Miu Sakamoto; Oboro no Kanata, Akari no Kehai (2007) – producer
- Miyavi; "Hi no Hikari Sae Todokanai Kono Basho De" (2008) – guest guitarist on the title track
- Acid Black Cherry; Black List (2008) – guitar
- Toshi; Samurai Japan (2010)
- Tezya; Life My Babylon (2010) – on "Cosmo of Love"
- m.o.v.e.; "Overtakers" (2011) – guitar
- Japan United with Music; "All You Need Is Love" (2012) – guitar solo
- Ryuichi Kawamura; Concept RRR 「Never Fear」 (2014) – guitar on "Ai no Uta"
- Sukekiyo; Immortalis (2014) – remixed "Hemimetabolism" on the limited edition
- Kazumi Watanabe; Guitar is Beautiful KW45 (2016) – guest guitar on "Round Midnight" and "Island Hop"
- Dir En Grey; "Utafumi" (2016) – violin on "Kūkoku no Kyōon"
- Trustrick; Trick (2016) – violin on "I Wish You Were Here"
- Maon Kurosaki; "Vermillion" (2016) – composed and produced the title track
- Yoshiki feat. Hyde; "Red Swan" (2018) – guest guitar
- SawanoHiroyuki[nZk]; Remember (2019) – violin on "Glory -Into the RM-"
- Mayo Suzukaze; Fairy ~A・I~ Ai (2021) – composed "Chikyū no Namida"
- Lim Hyung-joo; "History of Love" (2024) – featured on "Haruyo, Koi (2024 New Recording)"

=== Tribute album appearances ===
- Auto-Mod; Tribute to Auto-Mod ~Flower in the Dark~ (1994) – "Smell" and "Deathtopia"
- Japan; Life in Tokyo - A Tribute to Japan (September 4, 1996) – "Quiet Life", also plays on "The Experience of Swimming" by Le Fou
- Osamu Tezuka; Atom Kids Remix ~ 21 Century Boys and Girls (February 24, 1999) – remixed "Fushigi na Merumo" by Cibo Matto
- Anarchy; Q:Are we Anarchist? (June 23, 1999) – "Reformation Child (Revolution Kids)"
- Yellow Magic Orchestra; YMO Remixes Technopolis 2000-00 (November 3, 2000) – remixed "Perspective"
- Yellow Magic Orchestra; Tribute to YMO (September 8, 2004) – remixed "1000 Knives"
- Gundam; Gundam Unplugged ～Acogi De Gundam A.c.2009～ (December 9, 2009) – "Beginning"
- Dead End; Dead End Tribute - Song of Lunatics (2013) – guitar on "Serafine"
- Der Zibet; Issay Gave Life to Flowers - A Tribute to Der Zibet - (July 6, 2024) – violin on "Der Rhein"
- Godland; Godland (April 15, 2026) – guitar, composed "Zangen Siren" and "Crow"

=== Various artists compilation appearances ===
- Dance 2 Noise 004 (January 21, 1993) – "Revive"
- Grand Cross (August 11, 1999) – "Aquarius After the Le Fou", "Luna-tica ~Life on the Hill Mix~ (Remixed by 4Hero)"
- Sugizo Compiles Global Music I (October 23, 2002)
