= Cross Season =

Single by Nami Tamaki

from the album Don't Stay
- B-side: i CAN FLY; Lost and Found
- Released: March 14, 2007
- Genre: Japanese pop, pop rock
- Length: N/A
- Label: Sony Music Japan
- Songwriter(s): Asakura Makoto
- Producer(s): Daisuke Asakura

Nami Tamaki singles chronology
"Sanctuary" (2006)	"Cross Season" (2007)	"Brightdown" (2007)

"Cross Season" is the 13th single by Japanese pop singer Nami Tamaki. The lyrical content of CROSS SEASON is of Nami Tamaki's high school graduation. The single was able to reach number #23 on Oricon. This song was produced by Daisuke Asakura.

Tamaki has stated in an interview that the cover of the single was inspired by the joys and hardships of high school. This single also marks Tamaki's change in sound, considering that the two b-sides are rock-influenced.

== Track listing ==
1. "Cross Season"
2. "I Can Fly"
3. "Lost and Found"
4. "Cross Season" (Instrumental)
