= NT Gundam Cover =

Studio album by Nami Tamaki
- Released: June 25, 2014
- Recorded: 2014
- Genres: J-pop; dance-pop; anison
- Length: 45:43
- Language: Japanese
- Label: Teichiku Records

Nami Tamaki chronology
Ready! (2011)	NT Gundam Cover (2014)

Music video
- NT Gundam Cover all songs digest on YouTube

NT Gundam Cover is a cover album by Nami Tamaki, released on June 25, 2014, to commemorate the 35th anniversary of the Gundam franchise. The album peaked at #38 on Oricon's Weekly Album Chart on July 7, 2014, and charted for four weeks.

== Track listing ==
All tracks are arranged by Lefty Monster P, except 2, 9–10 by Toshiyuki Kishi, and 3 and 8 by Tom H@ck.

No.	Title	Lyrics	Music	Original series	Length
1.	"Meguriai (めぐりあい; "Encounters")"	Rin Iogi; Masao Urino	Daisuke Inoue	Mobile Suit Gundam III: Encounters in Space	3:57
2.	"Arashi no Naka de Kagayaite (嵐の中で輝いて; "Shine in the Storm")"	Natsumi Watanabe	Maoto Yumeno	Mobile Suit Gundam: The 08th MS Team	4:40
3.	"Men of Destiny"	Yoshihiko Andō	Miki Matsubara	Mobile Suit Gundam 0083: Stardust Memory	3:51
4.	"Zeta - Toki wo Koete (Z・刻をこえて; Zeta - Transcending Times)"	Neil Sedaka; Iogi	Sedaka	Mobile Suit Zeta Gundam	3:33
5.	"Silent Voice (サイレントヴォイス, Sairento Voisu)"	Urino	Hiroaki Serizawa	Mobile Suit Gundam ZZ	3:27
6.	"Eternal Wind ~Hohoemi wa Hikaru Kaze no Naka~ (ETERNAL WIND～ほほえみは光る風の中～; Eternal Wind ~Smile in the Shining Wind~)"	Yui Nishiwaki	Nishiwaki; Yoko Orihara	Mobile Suit Gundam F91	5:01
7.	"Umiyori mo Fukaku (海よりも深く; Deeper Than the Sea)"	Nozomi Inoue	Akira Shirakawa	Mobile Fighter G Gundam	3:04
8.	"Just Communication"	Shiina Nagano	Kōji Makaino	Mobile Suit Gundam Wing	4:10
9.	"Dreams"	RO-M	RO-M	from After War Gundam X	4:49
10.	"Akatsuki no Kuruma (暁の車; "Wheels of Dawn")"	Yuki Kajiura	Kajiura	Mobile Suit Gundam SEED	5:18
11.	"Believe"	Saeko Nishio	Kichio Aoi	Mobile Suit Gundam SEED	3:53
Total length:					45:43

== Charts ==
Chart (2014)	Peak position
Japanese Albums (Oricon)	38
