= Shine (Luna Sea album) =

1998 studio album by Luna Sea

Studio album by Luna Sea
- Released: July 23, 1998
- Recorded: Sound Sky, Eggs & Shep, IRC2, Crescente, Sound Studio Greenbird Suginami, Planet, Wonder Station, Bazooka, Sound City
- Genres: Alternative rock; hard rock
- Length: 69:58
- Label: Universal
- Producer: Luna Sea

Luna Sea chronology
Style (1996)	Shine (1998)	Lunacy (2000)

Singles from Shine
- 1. "Storm" Released: April 15, 1998; 2. "Shine" Released: June 3, 1998; 3. "I for You" Released: July 15, 1998

Shine is the sixth studio album by Japanese rock band Luna Sea, released on July 23, 1998. It was the band's first since switching record labels to Universal and their second consecutive number one studio album, following 1996's Style. With over 1 million copies sold, it is also their best-selling and was certified Million by the RIAJ. Shine was named "Rock Album of the Year" at the 13th Japan Gold Disc Awards.

== Overview ==
To promote Shine Luna Sea went on the Shining Brightly tour, which ended with two sold out shows at the Tokyo Dome on December 23 and 24, 1998. The band then performed their first overseas shows in Taiwan, Hong Kong, and Shanghai in January 1999. This move garnered press attention and criticism with questions on whether or not it would be successful, as the band's international fanbase was unknown; even one day before the shows, the number of tickets sold was unknown. The Shanghai concert was particularly notable as their music was not licensed for release in mainland China.

Sugizo used a 1956 Gibson Les Paul Custom to record some of the album, including "Storm" and "I for You".

Some tracks feature additional performers aside from the band; "I for You" features Sugizo's mother playing cello, and "Another" has Mai Yamane performing background vocals. A different version of "Breathe", which includes the addition of strings, was used for the Japanese edition of the soundtrack to the Disney movie Mulan.

"Storm" was used as the April 1998 theme song for NHK's music television show Pop Jam, while "I for You" was used as the theme song for the Japanese TV drama God, Please Give Me More Time (神様、もう少しだけ, Kamisama, mō Sukoshi Dake), which also aired overseas in Asia. "Shine" was used in a Toyota commercial, and "Unlikelihood" in a Kirin beverage commercial that starred Ryuichi.

Shine was remastered and re-released by Universal Music Group on December 5, 2007, it came with a DVD of the promotional videos for "Storm", "Shine" and "I for You". Shine and the band's other seven major label studio albums, up to Luv, were released on vinyl record for the first time on May 29, 2019.

== Cover artwork ==
Like most of Luna Sea's releases, the artwork for Shine was designed by Ken Sakaguchi. Before working on the album's first single, "Storm", bassist J had told him that the keyword for the visual image was "light". Having continued this theme with the subsequent two singles, "Shine" and "I for You", Sakaguchi and his graphic collaborator Nicci Keller wanted to do the same for the album itself. After discussing it with the band, the idea, "if you're speeding down the highway in the middle of the night... suddenly, this incredible light envelops you...!", came up. Imagining he would have to drive through a long highway tunnel, Sakaguchi figured he would never be able to get filming permission for that in Japan, and so decided to go to Los Angeles. Sakaguchi and Keller leased a vehicle suitable for filming while driving, equipped it with lots of lighting equipment and, after having traffic shut down by police, shot the photos in the 2nd Street Tunnel, which Sakaguchi had seen in the 1996 film Independence Day. The photos of the band members included in the album booklet were shot early in the morning on a private beach in Shimoda, Shizuoka.

== Reception ==
Professional ratings
Review scores
Source	Rating
Allmusic	4/5 stars

With over 1 million copies sold, Shine is Luna Sea's best-selling studio album and was certified Million by the RIAJ. It was their second consecutive studio album to reach number one on the Oricon Albums Chart (third number one overall when including the 1997 compilation Singles), and charted for 13 weeks. Shine was also named "Rock Album of the Year" at the 13th Japan Gold Disc Awards. The 2007 re-release reached number 236 on the Oricon chart.

Alexey Eremenko of AllMusic called the album one of the band's best, along with 1994's Mother, and referred to it as "hard rock without the machismo, sentimentality without the sappiness, and melody without the one-dimensional attitude of pop music." The songs vary from "speedy numbers to power ballads and midtempo marches" but all are equally convincing. They finished with "Shine has the unmistakable vibe of a band in control of their sound, and it's a small wonder that Luna Sea had an impact on literally hundreds of bands that followed in their wake in the next decade."

Music writer Takuya Ito noted that despite being the band's best-selling album and fueling the visual kei boom of 1998, Shine is also the Luna Sea album that receives the most criticism. He opined this is because the band had to find a way to utilize Ryuichi after his blockbuster success as a solo artist during their one-year hiatus and deal with the resulting change in his vocals, which gives Shine an undeniable feeling that Luna Sea has become "milder". Ito also noted the album itself to be heavy on medium-tempo songs, making it a bit long-winded, but called "Breathe" a masterpiece of a ballad.

== Legacy ==
"Storm" was covered by Nami Tamaki for the 2007 Luna Sea Memorial Cover Album -Re:birth-. It was also covered by Lolita23q on the 2011 compilation Crush! -90's V-Rock Best Hit Cover Songs-.

"I for You" was covered by Juichi Morishige of Ziggy for 2007's Luna Sea Memorial Cover Album -Re:birth-. Inzargi, vocalist of Megamasso, also covered it for his 2012 cover album.

"Shine" was covered by Marty Friedman, Legend and Shinichiro Suzuki for the 2007 Luna Sea Memorial Cover Album -Re:birth-, and by Amber Girls on the 2011 compilation Crush! 2 -90's V-Rock Best Hit Cover Songs-.

== Track listing ==
All tracks are written by Luna Sea.

No.	Title	Length
1.	"Time Has Come" (Originally composed by J.)	6:34
2.	"Storm" (Originally composed by J.)	5:05
3.	"No Pain" (Originally composed by Sugizo.)	6:15
4.	"Shine" (Originally composed by J.)	4:43
5.	"I for You" (Originally composed by Sugizo.)	5:30
6.	"Unlikelihood" (Originally composed by J.)	5:17
7.	"Another" (Originally composed by J.)	7:36
8.	"Millennium" (Originally composed by Sugizo and Shinya.)	4:45
9.	"Broken" (Originally composed by J.)	5:11
10.	"Velvet" (Originally composed by Inoran.)	4:27
11.	"Love Me" (Originally composed by Sugizo.)	3:50
12.	"Breathe" (Originally composed by Inoran. Originally written by Inoran and Ryuichi)	5:52
13.	"Up to You" (Originally composed by Inoran.)	4:55

== Personnel ==
Luna Sea

- Ryuichi – vocals
- Sugizo – guitar, violin
- Inoran – guitar
- J – bass
- Shinya – drums, percussion

Other

- Daisuke Kikuchi – synthesizer programming, digital edits, Hammond organ, acoustic piano
- Morinoki Children's Chorus – children's chorus
- Mai Yamane – female chorus
- Catherine Urquhart – female voice on and English translation for "No Pain"
- Tomoko Itoki – English translation for "Unlikelihood" and "Another"
