= Truth? (album) =

Studio album by Sugizo
- Released: November 19, 1997
- Genre: Drum and bass
- Length: 65:00
- Language: Japanese
- Label: Cross

Sugizo chronology
Truth? (1997)	C:lear (2003)

Singles from Truth?
- 1. "Lucifer" Released: July 9, 1997; 2. "A Prayer" Released: September 10, 1997

Truth? (stylized as TRUTH?) is the debut solo album by Japanese musician and composer Sugizo, released on November 19, 1997 by Cross. The drum and bass experimental album featured several guest musicians and peaked at the 12° position on Oricon charts.

== Background and release ==
In 1997, after reaching number one on Oricon for the first time with the fifth studio album Style, Luna Sea took a break and each member focused on their solo careers. Sugizo debuted his solo career on July 9 with the single "Lucifer". A remix version of it called "Replicant Lucifer" was released the following month. On September 10, he released "A Prayer" and like the previous single, a remix version called "Replicant Prayer" was released.

Truth? was released on CD and vinyl on November 19, 1997, with both singles being part of it, by the newly opened label by Sugizo himself, Cross. The album features several musicians, such as Ryuichi Sakamoto on piano, Mick Karn on bass and D-kiku. On December 21, as well as their singles, a remix version titled Replicant Truth? was released.

Celebrating his 20-year solo career, in addition to releasing Oneness M, Sugizo remastered and re-released Truth? on October 25, 2017. He also compiled the remixes "Replicant Lucifer", "Replicant Prayer" and Replicant Truth? on just one album, Replicants, released on the same day.

== Chart performance ==
"Lucifer" peaked at number eight on the Oricon Singles Chart staying for four weeks, while "A Prayer" peaked at seventh and stayed for five weeks. Truth? reached twelfth position and remained for three weeks on the Oricon Albums Chart.

== Track listing ==
All titles are stylized in capital letters, except "Le Fou" and "Femme Fatale".

All music is composed by Sugizo.

No.	Title	Length
1.	"Lucifer"	4:44
2.	"The Cage"	5:12
3.	"Kanon"	5:15
4.	"Europa"	4:18
5.	"Le Fou"	3:58
6.	"Beauty"	5:42
7.	"Chemical"	2:28
8.	"Ein Sof"	1:16
9.	"Missing"	6:01
10.	"Sperma"	2:39
11.	"Kind of Blue"	4:30
12.	"Femme Fatale"	0:54
13.	"Deliver..."	4:49
14.	"A Prayer"	5:03
15.	"Luna"	8:26
Total length:		65:00

== Personnel ==
- Sugizo - producer, composition

Additional musicians

- Ryuichi Sakamoto - piano
- Mick Karn - bass guitar
