= I for You =

Single by Luna Sea

from the album Shine
- B-side: "With"
- Released: July 1, 1998
- Genre: Alternative rock
- Label: Universal
- Songwriter: Luna Sea
- Producer: Luna Sea

Luna Sea singles chronology
| "Shine" (1998) | "I for You" (1998) | "Gravity" (2000) |

Music video
- "I for You" on YouTube

"I for You" is the eleventh single by Japanese rock band Luna Sea, released by Universal on July 1, 1998. It reached number 2 on the Oricon Singles Chart and was the 49th best-selling single of the year. It was the third and last in a serial release after the band's hibernation from 1997 to early 1998.

== Overview ==
Original scores for "I for You" were composed by guitarist Sugizo as an orchestrated version; although it was first written around 1993, it had not been considered for recording until later, when an opportunity appeared for creating a theme song for a TV drama. The final version of the song was furnished with revisions by vocalist Ryuichi. Sugizo used a 1956 Gibson Les Paul Custom to record the song, and his mother is featured playing the cello.

During the recording of "I for You", guitarist hide of X Japan, who was a close friend with members of the band, died. Some of the lyrics are described as a tribute to him by the members. It was used as the theme song for the Japanese TV drama God, Please Give Me More Time (神様、もう少しだけ, Kamisama, mō Sukoshi dake), which was also aired overseas in Asia and helped to popularize the band internationally, leading to their First Asian Tour the following year.

The B-side "With" was originally composed by guitarist Inoran around 1994. Clock ticking appears near the end of the song, connecting it to the first track of Shine, "Time Has Come".

== Cover artwork ==
Like most of Luna Sea's releases, the artwork to the "I for You" single was designed by Ken Sakaguchi. Continuing the theme from the band's single "Storm", where bassist J told him that the keyword for the visual image was "light", Sakaguchi and his graphic collaborator Nicci Keller traveled to Saipan. For two days, they traveled all around the island, diving in the ocean and even scuba diving in a pool, in attempts to express "light" as seen from Earth. Photos from the trip were also used in the artwork of the band's previous single, "Shine".

== Reception ==
"I for You" reached number 2 on the Oricon Singles Chart, charted for 16 weeks, and was certified Platinum by the RIAJ in July 1998 for sales over 400,000. It went on to become the 49th best-selling single of the year with 481,390 copies sold. In a 2021 poll conducted by Net Lab of 4,805 people on their favorite Luna Sea song, "I for You" came in ninth place with 206 votes. To commemorate the 70th anniversary of Hadano, Kanagawa, the hometown of four of Luna Sea's members, the Odakyu Electric Railway began using "I for You" as the outbound train melody at Hadano Station in November 2025.

== Track listing ==
All tracks written and arranged by Luna Sea.

| No. | Title | Length |
|---|---|---|
| 1. | "I for You" | 5:30 |
| 2. | "With" | 5:57 |

== Personnel ==
Luna Sea

- Ryuichi – vocals
- Sugizo – guitar, violin
- Inoran – guitar
- J – bass
- Shinya – drums, percussion

Production

- Hitoshi Hiruma – recording and mixing
- Akinori Kaizaki – recording
- Tohru Kotetsu – mastering
- Sakaguchi Ken Factory – art direction and graphic design
- Nicci Keller – photography

== Cover versions ==
Ryuichi recorded his own version of "I for You" for his 2006 cover album, Evergreen. It was also covered by Juichi Morishige of Ziggy for 2007's Luna Sea Memorial Cover Album -Re:birth-. In 2012, the song was covered by both Mr. Big singer Eric Martin and Megamasso singer Inzargi for their respective cover albums.
