= Shining Star (Nami Tamaki song) =

- ☆ 忘れないから ☆ (Wasurenaikara)

Single by Nami Tamaki

from the album Greeting
- Released: January 28, 2004
- Genre: Pop

Nami Tamaki singles chronology
""Prayer""	"Shining Star"	""Daitan ni Ikimashō""

"Shining Star" Wasurenai Kara (忘れないから) is Nami Tamaki's fourth single. It was used as the ending theme for the TV Variety show Matthew's Best Hit TV. It reached number 9 on the Oricon chart.

== Track listing ==
1. Shining Star *Wasurenai Kara*" Lyrics: Satomi, Shusui, Stefan Aberg Music: Shusui, Stefan Aberg
2. "Kanashimi no Valentine (悲しみのバレンタイン)" Lyrics: Emi Nishida, Daniel Gibson, Jorgen Ringqvist Music: Daniel Gibson, Jorgen Ringqvist
3. "High School Queen" Lyrics: Emi Nishida, Daniel Gibson, Jorgen Ringqvist Music: Daniel Gibson, Jorgen Ringqvist
4. "Shining Star ☆Wasurenai Kara☆" -Instrumental- (Shining Star☆忘れないから☆)
