= Desire (Luna Sea song) =

Single by Luna Sea

from the album Style
- B-side: "Luv U"
- Released: November 13, 1995
- Genre: Alternative rock
- Length: 9:47
- Label: MCA Victor
- Songwriter: Luna Sea
- Producer: Luna Sea

Luna Sea singles chronology
| "Mother" (1995) | "Desire" (1995) | "End of Sorrow" (1996) |

Music video
- "Desire" on YouTube

"Desire" is the sixth single by Japanese rock band Luna Sea, released by MCA Victor on November 13, 1995. It is the first single from the band's fifth studio album, Style. It became the Luna Sea's second number 1 single on the Oricon Singles Chart, and charted for 14 weeks. It is their second best-selling single, behind only "Storm". The version of "Luv U" included on the single is slightly different from the one on Style.

== Cover artwork ==
Like most of Luna Sea's releases, the artwork to the "Desire" single was designed by Ken Sakaguchi. At the time, he was looking for a new graphic partner to collaborate with, and suddenly remembered Nicci Keller, whose child he previously worked with on a Miho Nakayama project and whose work has an infrared-like coloration. Listening to "Desire" as he drifted to sleep, Sakaguchi dreamt of "A woman... holding a large, old clock that was too big to carry, swaying gently in the womb, her white dress fluttering... smiling." He woke up with a start and immediately drew the image. Unlike the woman he had depicted in the artwork for Luna Sea's album Mother, this one was surrounded by a "gentle, warm happiness". At a studio equipped for underwater photography, Sakaguchi and Keller conducted their first underwater shoot, with a female model who was not great at treading water. Sakaguchi also had the idea of using this visual in the music video for "Desire", so he borrowed an 8 mm camera from director Sōjirō Ōtsubo, put it into a plastic bag and shot film underwater.

== Reception ==
"Desire" became the band's second number 1 single on the Oricon Singles Chart, and charted for 14 weeks. With 588,000 copies sold, it is their second best-selling single, behind only "Storm".

In a 2021 poll conducted by Net Lab of 4,805 people on their favorite Luna Sea song, "Desire" came in eighth place with 230 votes.

== Track listing ==
All tracks written and arranged by Luna Sea.

| No. | Title | Length |
|---|---|---|
| 1. | "Desire" | 4:22 |
| 2. | "Luv U" | 5:25 |

== Personnel ==
Luna Sea

- Ryuichi – vocals
- Sugizo – guitar, violin
- Inoran – guitar
- J – bass
- Shinya – drums

Production

- Hitoshi Hiruma – recording and mixing
