= Don't Stay (album) =

- normal edition CD package

Studio album by Nami Tamaki
- Released: April 23, 2008 (Japan)
- Genre: Dance-pop, pop, J-pop
- Language: Japanese, some English
- Label: Sony Music Japan

Nami Tamaki chronology
Graduation: Singles (2006)	Don't Stay (2008)	Tamaki Nami Reproduct Best (2009)

Singles from Don't Stay
- 1. "Cross Season" Released: March 14, 2007; 2. "Brightdown" Released: August 29, 2007; 3. "Winter Ballades" Released: December 26, 2007

Don't Stay is the fourth album from Japanese pop singer Nami Tamaki, released on April 23, 2008, about one and a half years after Graduation: Singles, and celebrating five years since her first single "Believe". Two versions were available, the normal edition (SRCL 6778) and the limited edition with DVD (SRCL 6776-6777), three slip case box package and a 55-page booklet. An album tour titled Nami Tamaki 6th Concert "Don't Stay: Go!!" was scheduled for late summer starting in August. The album reached 14th place in the weekly album chart on Oricon Style.

== Track listing ==
The CD has 14 tracks, and the limited edition DVD contains six video clips, four of which are the promotional videos and one is a documentary on Nami's 19-day trip in America promoting her first album, Greeting, and the shooting of the video for her fifth single ("Daitan ni Ikimashō"). The final video is an interview about being active in the music industry for five years.

CD (SRCL-6776 and SRCL-6778)
No.	Title	Lyrics	Music	Length
1.	"Don't Stay Inst" (Instrumental)		Wataru Maeguchi
2.	"Visualize"	Junko Tuji	Yoshihiro Kusano; Sound Producer: Yoshihiro Kusano and Koji Taniguchi (Side Kick)
3.	"Together" (NNN News Real-time theme song)	Hiroko Oma	Yuuki Tsuruta; Sound Producer: 83key
4.	"Brightdown" (TV Tokyo anime "D.Gray-man" Season 2 opening theme song)	Miki Fujisue	Miki Fujisue; Sound Producer: nishi-ken
5.	"Hitchhiker"	Seriko Natsuno	Marty Friedman
6.	"Speedway"	mavie	ryosuke Sound Producer: Sinya Saito
7.	"Station"	Tatsusi Nakamura	Yasuo Otani; Sound Producer: Toru Watanabe
8.	"Promise"	Sumiyo Mutsumi, Hiroo Yamaguchi	Hiroo Yamaguchi; Sound Producer: Masaki Iehara
9.	"Re-birth"	Ritsuko Tanifuji	Miki Fujisue; Sound Producer: Sinya Sito
10.	"Gokigendaze!: Nothing But Something feat. Ken (Da Pump) / ごきげんだぜっ! ～Nothing But Something～ feat. Ken (Da Pump)" (Same title cover song from Da Pump released on April 22, 1998)	m.c.A.T	Akio Togashi
11.	"Eden"	Takamitsu Shimazaki	Takamitsu Shimazaki; Sound Producer: Takamitsu Shimazaki and Shun Ito
12.	"Cross Season: After Graduation Mix" (NTV Program "Sports Urugutsu" Ending Theme)	Makoto Asakura	Daisuke Asakura
13.	"423"	Nami Tamaki	Yohei Sugita; Sound Producer: Daisuke Kato
14.	"My Way Reproduction Original Mix" (Bonus Track)	Rika Kaneko	Tomo

Limited edition DVD (SRCL-6777)
No.	Title	Length
1.	"Cross Season" (Video clip/PV)
2.	"Brightdown" (Video clip/PV)
3.	"Promise" (Video clip/PV)
4.	"Gokigendaze!: Nothing But Something feat. Ken (Da Pump) / ごきげんだぜっ! ～Nothing But Something～ feat. Ken (Da Pump)" (Video clip/PV)
5.	"Tamaki Nami in U.S.A: 19 Day Up Close Documentation" (Video clip)
6.	"5 Year Anniversary Special Interview" (Video clip)
Total length:		About 51 minutes
