= Reason (Nami Tamaki song) =

Single by Nami Tamaki
- Released: November 10, 2004
- Genre: J-pop
- Label: Sony Records
- Songwriter(s): shungo, Yasuo Otani

Nami Tamaki singles chronology
"Daitan ni Ikimashō" (2004)	"Reason" (2004)	"Fortune" (2004)

"Reason" is the 6th single release from J-Pop artist Nami Tamaki. It was released on November 10, 2004, and ranked 2 on the Oricon Singles Chart. It was also used as the ending theme to the anime Mobile Suit Gundam SEED Destiny.

== Track listing ==
1. "Reason" Lyrics: shungo Music: Yasuo Otani
2. "Promised Land" Lyrics: Saeko Nishio Music: Yuta Nakano
3. "Truth" Lyrics: mavie Music: Miki Watanabe
4. "Reason" (Instrumental)

== Disambiguation ==
Reason (Album Version)
Track 2 on the Make Progress album.

Reason (Single Version)
Track 1 on the Reason single.

Reason (Mobilesuit Gundam SEED Destiny Complete Best Version)
Same as the previous two but only found on the special soundtrack album to Gundam SEED Destiny, Mobile Suit Gundam SEED Destiny Complete Best as track number 2.

Reason -NYLON STAY COOL MIX-
This is a remix of Reason found on the special album Mobile Suit Gundam SEED Destiny Complete Best as track number 11.

Reason (reproduction ~flash forward mix~)
A remix of Reason found on the album Make Progress as track 14.

Reason (Instrumental)
Is the version of Reason with Nami's vocals cut out. Only found on the Reason single.
