= Graduation: Singles =

Studio album by Nami Tamaki
- Released: November 29, 2006 (Japan)
- Genre: Dance-pop, pop, J-pop
- Label: Sony Music Japan

Nami Tamaki chronology
Speciality (2006)	Graduation: Singles (2006)	Don't Stay (2008)

Graduation: Singles is the first compilation album from Japanese singer Nami Tamaki. It peaked at number six in the Oricon album charts and charted for ten weeks.

== Track listing ==
CD
No.	Title	Length
1.	"Believe"	3:55
2.	"Realize"	4:41
3.	"Prayer"	4:48
4.	"Shining Star 忘れないから (Wasurenai Kara)"	4:24
5.	"大胆にいきましょう Heart & Soul (Daitan ni Ikimashou)"	3:11
6.	"Reason"	4:50
7.	"Fortune"	4:23
8.	"Heroine"	4:47
9.	"Get Wild"	4:26
10.	"My Way"	4:13
11.	"Sunrize"	4:45
12.	"Result"	4:17
13.	"Sanctuary"	4:56
14.	"19 Growing Up: Ode to My Buddy (limited edition bonus track)"
