= In Silence (song) =

Single by Luna Sea

from the album Style
- B-side: "Ray"
- Released: July 15, 1996
- Genre: Gothic rock, alternative rock, dream pop, ethereal wave, shoegaze
- Length: 13:08
- Label: MCA Victor
- Songwriter: Luna Sea
- Producer: Luna Sea

Luna Sea singles chronology
"End of Sorrow" (1996)	"In Silence" (1996)	"Storm" (1998)

Music video
- "In Silence" on YouTube

"In Silence" is the eighth single by Japanese rock band Luna Sea, released by MCA Victor on July 15, 1996. It became the band's first song used in a television program when it was used as the theme song of the Japanese dub of the American television drama Chicago Hope. The single reached number 2 on the Oricon Singles Chart, and was certified Gold by the RIAJ for sales over 200,000.

== Overview ==
"In Silence" features uncredited backing vocals by Akino Arai. It was used as the theme song for the first season of the Japanese dub of the American television drama Chicago Hope. The song's music video features Eiji Wentz.

== Reception ==
"In Silence" reached number 2 on the Oricon Singles Chart, and charted for nine weeks. In 1996, it was certified Gold by the RIAJ for sales over 200,000. In a 2021 poll conducted by Net Lab of 4,805 people on their favorite Luna Sea song, "In Silence" came in sixth place with 319 votes.

== Track listing ==
All tracks written and arranged by Luna Sea.

No.	Title	Length
1.	"In Silence"	5:35
2.	"Ray"	7:33

== Personnel ==
Luna Sea

- Ryuichi – vocals
- Sugizo – guitar, violin
- Inoran – guitar
- J – bass
- Shinya – drums

Production

- Hitoshi Hiruma – recording and mixing
