= Fortune (song) =

Single by Nami Tamaki

from the album Make Progress
- Released: January 26, 2005
- Genre: Pop
- Songwriter(s): shungo, Miki Fujisue

Nami Tamaki singles chronology
"Reason" (2004)	"Fortune" (2005)	"Heroine" (2005)

"Fortune" is the seventh single release from J-pop artist Nami Tamaki and was released on January 26, 2005 as a limited edition, and a regular edition. It claimed the 6th spot on the Oricon Singles Chart. Fortune was also used as a theme for the PlayStation 2 game Radiata Stories.

== Track listing ==
1. "Fortune"
  Lyrics: shungo, Miki Fujisue Music: Miki Fujisue
2. "Everlasting"
  Lyrics: Takamitsu Shimazaki Music: Takamitsu Shimazaki
3. "DreamerS"
  Lyrics: Nami Tamaki Music: JamCrea
4. "Fortune" (Instrumental)

== Remixes ==
Fortune (Album Version)

This is the song found on the album Make Progress as track 11.

Fortune (Single Version)

This is the same as the album version which is found on the single Fortune as track one.

Fortune Reproduction ~Radiata Mix~

This is a remix of Fortune found on the special edition release of the "Heroine" single as track 5

Fortune (Instrumental)

This is only found on the single Fortune as track number 4. Nami's vocals are cut out in this version.
