= Shine (Luna Sea song) =

Single by Luna Sea

from the album Shine
- B-side: "Looper"
- Released: June 3, 1998
- Genre: Alternative rock
- Length: 8:50
- Label: Universal
- Songwriter: Luna Sea
- Producer: Luna Sea

Luna Sea singles chronology
"Storm" (1998)	"Shine" (1998)	"I for You" (1998)

Music video
- "Shine" on YouTube

"Shine" is the tenth single by Japanese rock band Luna Sea, released by Universal on June 3, 1998. It was the band's fifth number 1 single on the Oricon Singles Chart, and was certified Platinum by the RIAJ for sales over 400,000.

== Overview ==
"Shine" was originally composed by bassist J. It was used in a Toyota commercial. The song was covered by Amber Gris on the compilation Crush! 2 -90's V-Rock Best Hit Cover Songs-, which was released on November 23, 2011 and features current visual kei bands covering songs from bands that were important to the 1990s visual kei movement.

The title of "Looper" came from the fact that the bass and drums are repeated in loop. The fast spoken English words in the background are performed by guitarist Sugizo.

== Cover artwork ==
Like most of Luna Sea's releases, the artwork to the "Shine" single was designed by Ken Sakaguchi. Continuing the theme from the band's previous single "Storm", where J told him that the keyword for the visual image was "light", Sakaguchi and his graphic collaborator Nicci Keller traveled to Saipan. For two days, they traveled all around the island, diving in the ocean and even scuba diving in a pool, in attempts to express "light" as seen from Earth. Photos from the trip were also used in the artwork of the band's next single, "I for You".

== Reception ==
"Shine" was Luna Sea's fifth number 1 single on the Oricon Singles Chart, their second consecutively, and charted for eight weeks. In June 1998, it was certified Platinum by the RIAJ for sales over 400,000.

== Track listing ==
All tracks written and arranged by Luna Sea.

No.	Title	Length
1.	"Shine"	4:43
2.	"Looper"	4:07

== Personnel ==
Luna Sea

- Ryuichi – vocals
- Sugizo – guitar, violin
- Inoran – guitar
- J – bass
- Shinya – drums, percussion

Production

- Hitoshi Hiruma – recording and mixing
- Tohru Kotetsu – mastering
- Sakaguchi Ken Factory – art direction and graphic design
- Nicci Keller – photography
