= End of Sorrow =

Single by Luna Sea

from the album Style
- B-side: "Twice"
- Released: March 25, 1996
- Genre: Alternative rock
- Length: 9:47
- Label: MCA Victor
- Songwriter: Luna Sea
- Producer: Luna Sea

Luna Sea singles chronology
"Desire" (1995)	"End of Sorrow" (1996)	"In Silence" (1996)

Music video
- "End of Sorrow" on YouTube

"End of Sorrow" is the seventh single by Japanese rock band Luna Sea, released by MCA Victor on March 25, 1996. It became the band's third number 1 single on the Oricon Singles Chart, and was certified Platinum by the RIAJ for sales over 400,000. This single version of the title track is slightly different from the one that appears on the album, Style.

== Reception ==
"End of Sorrow" became Luna Sea's third number 1 single on the Oricon Singles Chart, their second consecutively, and charted for eight weeks. In 1996, it was certified Platinum by the RIAJ for sales over 400,000. In a 2021 poll conducted by Net Lab of 4,805 people on their favorite Luna Sea song, "End of Sorrow" came in fifth place with 346 votes.

The song was covered by Yu-Ki & DJ Koo from the band TRF for 2007's Luna Sea Memorial Cover Album -Re:birth-.

== Track listing ==
All tracks written and arranged by Luna Sea.

No.	Title	Length
1.	"End of Sorrow"	4:24
2.	"Twice"	6:16

== Personnel ==
Luna Sea

- Ryuichi – vocals
- Sugizo – guitar, violin
- Inoran – guitar
- J – bass
- Shinya – drums

Production

- Hitoshi Hiruma – recording and mixing
