= Brightdown =

- Brightdown (CD Only)

Single by Nami Tamaki

from the album Don't Stay
- B-side: あなた色の涙; Endless Dream
- Released: August 29, 2007
- Genre: Japanese pop, pop rock
- Length: N/A
- Label: Sony Music Japan
- Songwriter(s): Miki Fujisue

Nami Tamaki singles chronology
"Cross Season" (2007)	"Brightdown" (2007)	"Winter Ballades" (2007)

"Brightdown" is a single from the Nami Tamaki album Don't Stay. Brightdown was used as the 2nd opening theme to the anime D.Gray Man.

== CD track listing ==
1. "Brightdown"
2. "Color of Your Tears"
3. "Endless Dream"
4. "Brightdown" -Instrumental-

== Limited Edition DVD track listing ==
1. "Brightdown" Video Clip
