= Best Concert: My Graduation =

Video by Nami Tamaki
- Released: June 13, 2007 (Japan)
- Genres: Dance-pop, pop, J-pop
- Label: Sony Music Japan

Best Concert: My Graduation is the 2nd concert DVD from Japanese pop singer Nami Tamaki. The DVD managed to reach number 19 on the Oricon DVD Chart. It is so far the highest budgeted concert from Nami Tamaki, featuring a large screen, two stage levels, and professional dancers, as well as unique costumes.

== Concert set-list ==
1. "OP. My Graduation"
2. "High School Queen"
3. "Realize"
4. "Sunrize"
5. "Promised Land"
6. "Shning Star: Wasurenai Kara"
7. "(Nami's Original Songs Medley) Be Positive: Dreamers/Identity"
8. "Heroine"
9. "You"
10. "Dance Interlude"
11. "Get Wild"
12. "Reason"
13. "(Medley) Fortune: My Way/Fortune"
14. "Heart and Soul: Daitan Ni Ikimashou"
15. "Sanctuary"
16. "Result"

Encore

1. "(Medley) Prayer: Programless Beat Mix I Can Fly"
2. "Cross Season"
3. "Believe"
4. "19 Growing Up: Ode to My Buddy"
