= Tamaki Nami Reproduct Best =

Remix album by Nami Tamaki
- Released: March 25, 2009
- Genre: Dance-pop, pop, J-pop
- Label: Sony Music Japan

Nami Tamaki chronology
Don't Stay (2008)	Tamaki Nami Reproduct Best (2009)

Tamaki Nami Reproduct Best is a remix album released by Japanese Pop singer Nami Tamaki on March 25, 2009. The album is a compilation of Tamaki's singles, all remixed. The album has some entirely new remixes as well as some old ones.

== Track listing ==
A Side
No.	Title	Length
1.	"Brightdown Electrostatics Mix" (Remix by Metalmouse)	4:18
2.	"Prayer Brilhando Mix" (Remix by applebonker)	4:58
3.	"Sanctuary Instantiation Mix" (Remix by Pax Japonica Groove)	5:49
4.	"Realize KZ Strictly Uptempo Mix"	4:53
5.	"Heroine Inner Light Mix" (Remix by DJ Deckstream)	4:27
6.	"Promise Dub's Sentimental dub Mix" (Remix by Dub Master X)	5:56
7.	"Fortune Reproduction: Radiata Mix"	5:45

B Side
No.	Title	Length
8.	"Result Drive You Crazy Mix" (Remix by Oddity)	4:26
9.	"Shining Star 忘れないから Galaxy Sympathy Mix" (Remix by CMJK)	5:22
10.	"My Way Reproduction Original Mix"	4:33
11.	"Reason Reproduction flash-forward mix"	4:32
12.	"Cross Season After Graduation Mix"	5:32
13.	"Believe Evidence01 Mix"	5:06

Bonus tracks
No.	Title	Length
14.	"大胆にいきましょう Heart & Soul UK Club Mix" (Remix by The Whip)	6:10
15.	"Believe JXL Deep Vocal Mix" (Remix by Junkie XL)	6:05
