= Luna Sea Memorial Cover Album -Re:birth- =

Compilation album by various artists
- Released: December 19, 2007
- Genre: Alternative rock, pop rock
- Length: 63:20
- Label: Avex Trax

Luna Sea Memorial Cover Album -Re:birth- is a tribute album to Japanese rock band Luna Sea, released on December 19, 2007 by Avex Trax. It collects cover versions of 12 of their songs performed by different artists that were either influenced by Luna Sea or artists that the band's members respect. The release of the album coincided with Luna Sea's one-night reunion concert on December 24, 2007. It reached number 33 on the Oricon Albums Chart.

== Reception ==
Luna Sea Memorial Cover Album -Re:birth- peaked at number 33 on the Oricon Albums Chart and charted for five weeks.

In a review, English-language Japanese music website JaME wrote that the album has bad and good moments, but "most of all it shows how influential Luna Sea was and how diverse their songs are." They noted how Nami Tamaki and Yu-Ki & DJ Koo of TRF's contributions replaced the traditional rock band instruments of the original songs, "Storm" and "End of Sorrow" respectively, with electronically generated sounds. JaME cited LM.C's version of "In My Dream (With Shiver)" as "undoubtedly" the best and "most attractive" song included, while feeling that High and Mighty Color took on "more than they could chew" with "Rosier".

High and Mighty Color later included their cover on their 2008 album Rock Pit.

== Track listing ==
All tracks are written by Luna Sea.

No.	Title	Length
1.	"Déjàvu" (Mucc)	5:37
2.	"Sweetest Coma Again" (Abingdon Boys School)	5:31
3.	"Storm" (Nami Tamaki)	4:54
4.	"Precious..." (Merry)	4:39
5.	"Rosier" (High and Mighty Color)	4:44
6.	"I for You" (Juichi Morishige of Ziggy)	5:16
7.	"In My Dream (With Shiver)" (LM.C)	5:24
8.	"End of Sorrow" (Yu-Ki & DJ Koo of TRF)	4:56
9.	"Love Song" (Kannivalism)	7:17
10.	"Shine" (Marty Friedman Vs. Legend Feat. Shinichiro Suzuki)	4:10
11.	"Wish" (Sid)	4:36
12.	"Moon" (Masami Tsuchiya)	6:16
