= Speciality (album) =

Studio album by Nami Tamaki
- Released: July 12, 2006 (Japan)
- Genre: Dance-pop, pop, J-pop
- Label: Sony Music Japan

Nami Tamaki chronology
Make Progress (2005)	Speciality (2006)	Graduation: Singles (2006)

Speciality is the third album by the Japanese pop singer Nami Tamaki. It was her second album to reach number one on the Oricon charts.

"Sanctuary", Tamaki's 12th single and the first one released from the Specialty album, was used as the opening theme for episodes 1 - 26 of the anime, Kiba. It was in the Oricon chart for five weeks, peaking at number 12.

== Track listing ==
Source: Oricon profile

1. "Speciality" (instrumental)
2. "Result"
3. "Identity"
4. "New World"
5. "Sunrize"
6. "Castaway"
7. "No Way Back"
8. "Sanctuary"
9. "Get Wild"
10. "Reach for the Rainbow"
11. "My Way"
12. "Ready Steady Go!"
