= Zero Landmine =

EP by Ryuichi Sakamoto and others
- Released: April 2001
- Recorded: 2001
- Length: 19:29
- Label: Warner Elektra Atlantic Corp. (Japan)

Zero Landmine is an extended play (EP) created to promote awareness of the problem of landmines and to promote a ban on landmines. Japanese recording artist Ryuichi Sakamoto led a collection of musicians to form a group called NML (No More Landmines), and they released the single Zero Landmine on April 25, 2001.

== Overview ==
Sakamoto and other musicians were concerned about the issue of landmines remaining buried in several countries. Together with a number of domestic and foreign artists and musicians, Sakamoto formed the group N.M.L. (No More Landmine). N.M.L. produced the EP recording Zero Landmine, which runs for about twenty minutes with ethnic music and singing forming the bulk of the second half of the song. David Sylvian wrote English lyrics for the song. Proceeds from the CD of the recording have gone towards de-mining efforts and other related funds.

== Track listing ==
1. Zero Landmine
2. Zero Landmine – Piano + Vocal Version
3. Zero Landmine – Piano + Cello Version
4. Zero Landmine – Short Version
5. Zero Landmine – Piano Version
6. Zero Landmine – The Track

== Participating artists ==
=== Japanese artists ===
- CHARA
- DJ KRUSH
- DREAMS COME TRUE
- Haruomi Hosono
- Kazutoshi Sakurai (Mr. Children)
- Mari Fujiwara
- Motoharu Sano
- REIGAKUSYA
- Ryuichi Sakamoto
- SUGIZO
- Taeko Onuki
- TAKURO (GLAY)
- TERU (GLAY)
- The Little Singers of Tokyo
- Ua
- Yamataka EYƎ
- Yukihiro Takahashi
- Yuuichi Ise

=== Foreign artists ===
- Arto Lindsay
- Brian Eno
- Choi Su Jyung
- Cyndi Lauper
- David Sylvian
- Jadranka
- Jaques Morelenbaum
- Kim Duk-Soo
- Kraftwerk
- Lee Jun-Woo
- Sonaali Rathod
- Steve Jansen
- Talvin Singh
- Ustad Sultan Khan
- Waldemar Bastos
- Yun Seo-Kyong
