= Style (Luna Sea album) =

1996 studio album by Luna Sea

Studio album by Luna Sea
- Released: April 22, 1996
- Studios: Sound Sky Kawana; Sound Sky Studio; Hitokuchizaka; Victor
- Genre: Progressive rock
- Length: 61:00
- Label: MCA Victor
- Producer: Luna Sea

Luna Sea chronology
Mother (1994)	Style (1996)	Shine (1998)

Singles from Style
- 1. "Desire" Released: November 13, 1995; 2. "End of Sorrow" Released: March 25, 1996; 3. "In Silence" Released: July 15, 1996

Style is the fifth studio album by Japanese rock band Luna Sea, released on April 22, 1996. It was the band's last on the record label MCA Victor, became their first number one on the Oricon Albums Chart, and charted for 21 weeks. It has sold over 725,000 copies, and was certified Platinum by the RIAJ. Luna Sea re-recorded the entire album and released it on November 29, 2023, through Avex Trax.

== Overview ==
Style was supported with Luna Sea embarking on the sold out Un Ending Style tour, which opened with two consecutive concerts at Yokohama Arena and continued for 16 concerts in nine locations, and mobilized an audience of over one hundred thousand people. It was continued in October with the Un Ending Style ~To Rise~ tour, 28 concerts in smaller venues, and ended with a Christmas concert on December 23, titled Christmas Stadium ~Mafuyu no Yagai~ (Christmas STADIUM 〜真冬の野外〜), at the outdoor Yokohama Stadium. During the concert it was announced that the band would have a temporary year break in 1997 for each member to pursue solo careers

The single versions of "End of Sorrow" and "Luv U" (b-side of "Desire") are slightly different from the album's.

"G." was used as the theme song of the 1999 24 Hours of Le Mans.

"End of Sorrow" was covered by Yu-Ki & DJ Koo of TRF for the 2007 Luna Sea Memorial Cover Album -Re:birth-.

"In Silence" features singer Akino Arai during the chorus. It was used as the theme song for season one of the Japanese dub of the American television drama Chicago Hope.

The album was remastered and re-released by Universal Music Group on December 5, 2007, it came with a DVD of the promotional videos for "End of Sorrow", "Desire" and "In Silence". This version reached number 218 on the Oricon chart.

Style and the band's other seven major label studio albums, up to Luv, were released on vinyl record for the first time on May 29, 2019.

== Reception ==
Style became Luna Sea's first number one on the Oricon Albums Chart and charted for 21 weeks. In 1996, it was certified Platinum by the RIAJ for sales over 400,000. It is the band's second best-selling studio album, with 725,000 copies sold.

According to music writer Takuya Ito, Luna Sea created Style under the agonizing expectation of surpassing the success and acclaim of their previous album Mother, and some people feel they succeeded. Ito described the first half of the album as intentionally mid-tempo, creating a dark and heavy atmosphere, while the second half feels like the horizons are opening up, before the closing track "Selves" leaves listeners with complex emotions instead of a clear resolution. He described "G." as a fast-paced tune that encapsulates Luna Sea's signature style, "Ra-Se-N" as featuring decadent ups-and-downs with odd time signatures, and "1999" as exuding madness and apocalyptic themes.

== Track listing ==
All tracks are written by Luna Sea.

No.	Title	Length
1.	"With Love" (Originally composed by Sugizo.)	5:13
2.	"G." (Originally composed by J.)	4:19
3.	"Hurt" (Originally composed by J.)	5:28
4.	"Ra-Se-N" (Originally composed by J.)	5:15
5.	"Luv U" (Originally composed by Inoran.)	5:23
6.	"Forever & Ever" (Originally composed by J.)	10:28
7.	"1999" (Originally composed by Sugizo.)	2:27
8.	"End of Sorrow" (Originally composed by Sugizo.)	4:21
9.	"Desire" (Originally composed by Sugizo.)	4:24
10.	"In Silence" (Originally composed by Sugizo.)	5:37
11.	"Selves" (Originally composed by Inoran.)	8:01
Total length:		61:00

== Personnel ==
Luna Sea

- Ryuichi – vocals
- Sugizo – guitar, violin
- Inoran – guitar
- J – bass
- Shinya – drums

Other

- Akino Arai – chorus
- Yukiko Sakanoue – female voice
- Shinozaki Group – strings
- Daisuke Kikuchi – programming, synthesizer, strings arrangement

== Charts ==
=== Weekly charts ===
Chart (1996)	Peak position
Japanese Albums (Oricon)	1

=== Year-end charts ===
Chart (1996)	Position
Japanese Albums (Oricon)	30

== Certifications ==
Region	Certification	Certified units/sales
Japan (RIAJ)	Platinum	400,000^{^}
^{^} Shipments figures based on certification alone.

== 2023 re-recording ==
Style

Studio album by Luna Sea
- Released: November 29, 2023
- Studios: Sound Dali; Sound Crew; Kamome; King Sekiguchidai; Art Terror; Dino; The World Is Yours
- Genre: Progressive rock
- Length: 62:13
- Label: Avex Trax
- Producer: Luna Sea

Luna Sea chronology
Cross (2019)	Mother; Style (2023)

In 2023, Luna Sea re-recorded the entirety of Style and Mother (1994) and released them simultaneously on November 29 through Avex Trax. Guitarist Inoran said that after their December 22–23, 2018 concerts, where the band recreated setlists from the tours for Image (1992) and Eden (1993), they wanted to do the same for Mother. Feeling it would be fun to do it as a tour, they decided to make it a dual tour with Style, and then felt it would be even more fun if it was tied to albums. Although there were no major re-arrangements done to the songs, Inoran said it depended on the composer of the original song. In his compositions, he slightly changed the synchronized parts and phrases but noted it might be hard to notice these small details. He also opined that J did not change his songs much, but Sugizo's alterations depended on each song. Pleased with the work he did producing their 2019 album Cross, Luna Sea asked Steve Lillywhite to mix the re-recorded albums.

=== Track listing ===
2023 Re-recording
No.	Title	Length
1.	"With Love"	5:15
2.	"G."	4:19
3.	"Hurt"	5:31
4.	"Ra-Se-N"	5:50
5.	"Luv U"	5:22
6.	"Forever & Ever"	10:35
7.	"1999"	2:26
8.	"End of Sorrow"	4:29
9.	"Desire"	4:19
10.	"In Silence"	5:38
11.	"Selves"	8:33
Total length:		62:13

=== Personnel ===
Luna Sea

- Ryuichi – vocals
- Sugizo – guitar, violin
- Inoran – guitar
- J – bass
- Shinya – drums

Other

- Yumi Kawamura – female chorus on "With Love", "Hurt", "Ra-Se-N", "Forever & Ever", "End of Sorrow", "Desire", "In Silence" and "Selves"
- Akino Arai – female chorus on "In Silence"
- Chloe – female voice on "1999" and "End of Sorrow"
- Daisuke "d-kiku" Kikuchi – sound effects and programming
- Hiroaki Hayama – string arrangement, copyist and piano on "Forever & Ever"
- Yui Strings – strings on "Forever & Ever"

Production

- Steve Lillywhite – mixing
- Kelana Halim – additional mixing
- Howie Weinberg – mastering
- Manabu Matsumura – additional mastering

=== Charts ===
Chart (2023)	Peak position
Japanese Albums (Oricon)	6
