= Nami Tamaki =

Japanese pop singer (born 1988)

Nami Tamaki 玉置成実
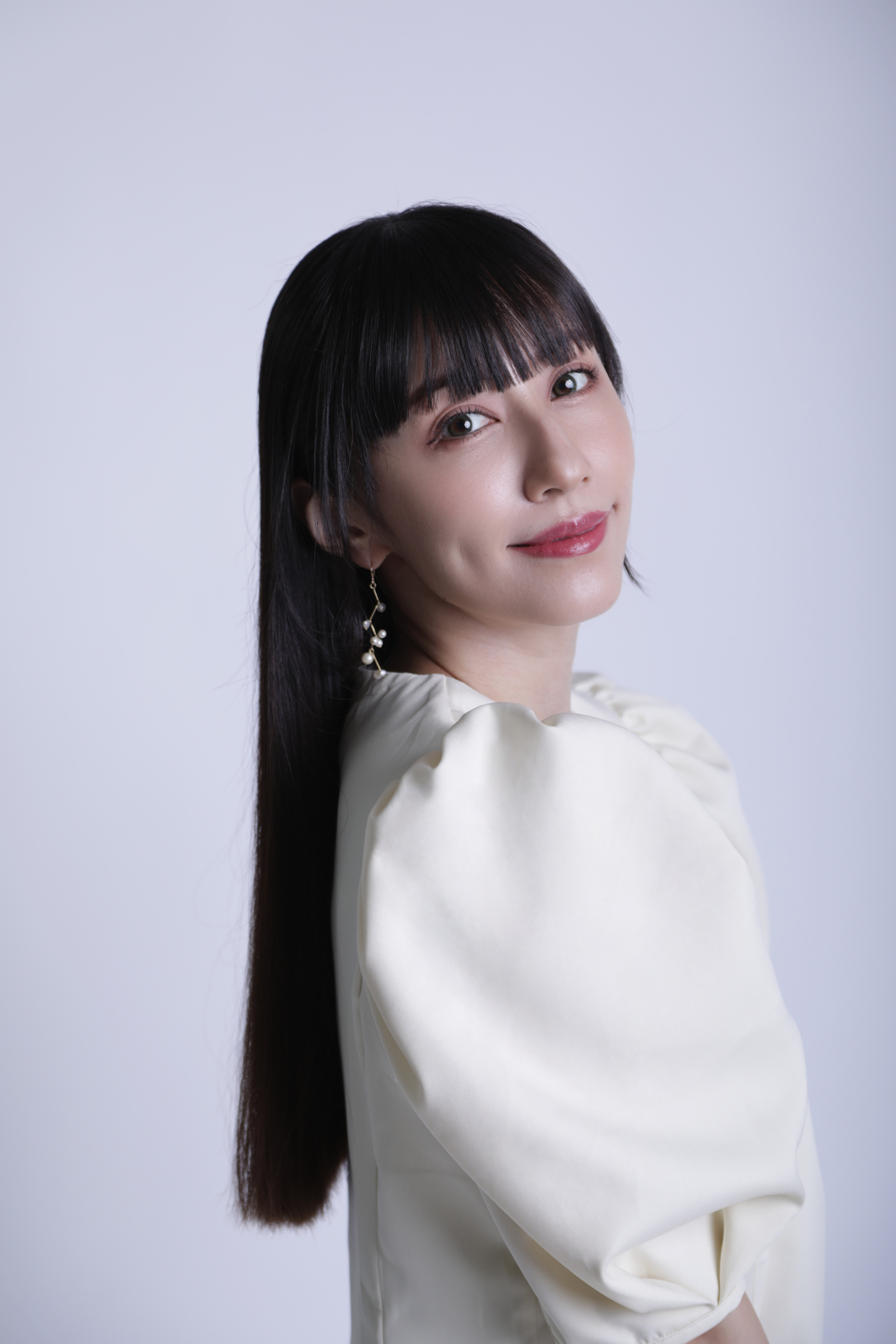
- Tamaki (2022)

Background information
- Born: June 1, 1988 (age 38); Wakayama, Japan
- Genres: J-pop; pop; dance-pop; pop rock; disco
- Occupation: Singer
- Instrument: Vocals
- Years active: 2001–present
- Labels: Sony Music Japan; Universal Music Japan; Teichiku; Warner Bros. Home Entertainment; Tofu
- Website: www.teichiku.co.jp/artist/tamaki-nami/ (Teichiku) www.tamaki-nami.net (Smile)

Nami Tamaki (玉置 成実, Tamaki Nami; born June 1, 1988) is a Japanese singer. As a teenager under the Sony Music Japan label, she had four top-ten albums, two of which reached number one. Her singles were used as theme songs for animated shows such as Mobile Suit Gundam Seed, Gundam Seed Destiny, and D. Gray-man, as well as being representative of the J-Pop music trend. She has various commercial tie-ins with the anime and games industry, and has also performed in stage musicals and a movie.

== Career ==
=== Beginnings ===
In 1999, Tamaki attended dance school and learned how to perform on stage. She auditioned for Sony Music Japan in 2001 when she was thirteen years old where she performed cover songs of the Destiny's Child hit "Survivor" and "Full Moon Prayer" by Core of Soul. She was selected out of 1,000 applicants and started her career in 2003 with her debut single "Believe" which was an opening song for the anime Mobile Suit Gundam Seed. Her follow-up single, "Realize", was also used in the series. The popularity of the Gundam franchise, and the inclusion of her work within it, helped her gain immediate popularity as a singer. Her first concert performance was opening for T.M.Revolution at the Pacific Media Expo in 2004. She released her first studio album, Greeting, and was hailed as a J-pop princess.

She graduated from high school in March 2007. Her first greatest hits album was released on November 29, 2006, to mark the event, and she soon began an acting and stage performing career. Her first Japanese tour, "Nami Tamaki Best Concert 'My Graduation'" took place in March 2007.

=== Record label transfer & "nami" ===
In 2008, Nami's live events were in full motion. Nami's fourth album, Don't Stay, was released on April 23, 2008, containing songs from her singles "Brightdown", "Cross Season", and "Winter Ballades", as well as some new tracks. The album did not chart or sell as well as her previous albums. Coinciding with the release, Nami held a special live tour "Anniversary Live 5," which took place in Tokyo and Osaka. A lengthy period with a lack of new material followed after the album's release, although Nami remained occupied with various concerts. Speculation and rumors surfaced about Nami leaving Sony Music Japan to join another record label. During a live performance on September 22, 2008, at "Girls Entertainment vol.1", Nami confirmed the transfer but could not give further details.

The September 2008 monthly issue of her fanclub magazine, "Amour Fan Club", released an official confirmation about the transfer, stating that Nami would be transferring to Universal Music Japan. The transfer marked a change in the record label under which Tamaki's subsequent musical activities were released.

Amour Fan Club Manager states:

Debut 5th Year Anniversary was welcomed, Nami moves forward with a jump for her record company transfer to UNIVERSAL-J from Sony Music Records. Currently, we are earnestly working with the new system. Release time is undecided, but until settlement of assurance we will notify you.

Please continue to support Nami chan !!

On January 15, 2009, Nami's official website announced the release of "Give Me Up", her first single under the Universal-J label and her 16th career single. The single features a more positive upbeat sound compared to her previous singles.

After the somewhat successful release of "Give Me Up" in January 2009, Nami continued to release new music with the singles "Friends!", "Moshimo Negai ga...", and "Omoide ni naru no?". Universal-J also gave Nami Tamaki the stage name "nami", as opposed to using her full name in kanji. Her first album under Universal-J, "Step", was released on February 24, 2010.

In late 2011, Nami made her second record label transfer to Teichiku Records, a sublabel of Victor Entertainment. Her first two singles with Teichiku Records, "Lady Mind" and "Paradise", were produced by Shinichi Osawa. Her third single with the label, "Real", was released on April 17, 2013. The single included a remake of "Believe" in commemoration of the tenth anniversary of her debut. The title song was produced by nishi-ken, who collaborated with Nami previously for her albums Speciality and Don't Stay.

=== Anime and game industry ===
Nami has a relatively close relationship with the ACG (Anime, Comics, Game) industry, as she contributed to several ACG franchises with her music. Well-known examples of her contributions include those in the Gundam SEED and Gundam SEED Destiny franchise ("Realize", "Believe", "Reason", "Result" and "IDentity"), "Brightdown", an opening song for the anime series D.Gray-man, and "Sanctuary", an opening song for the anime series Kiba.

She also performed the song "Fortune" as the main theme for the PS2 role-playing game Radiata Stories (as well as having a cameo appearance in the Japanese version of the game itself), and "CASTAWAY" as the theme song for a GBA turn-based strategy game, Super Robot Wars J. The release of "CASTAWAY" also featured a cover of the famous theme song "Get Wild" from the anime City Hunter, originally performed by TM Network.

Nami's 16th single, "Give Me Up", was used as the theme song for the anime Yatterman. Another song, "Negai Hoshi", which is included in her 17th single, is the theme song for the Wii RPG, Arc Rise Fantasia, while her 18th single, "Moshimo Negai ga..." is also the theme song for another Wii RPG, Valhalla Knights: Eldar Saga. Both games were released by Marvelous Entertainment.

=== Health ===
In 2014, Nami announced that she had become frustrated as she was having trouble singing her songs. She then went on to state that she had been struggling with sinusitis since a young age and had regularly been receiving treatment, but decided to get surgery to fix the problem. Once recovered, she said that she felt good and no longer had problems. However, in 2015 she was diagnosed with vocal nodules as she had been having pain while singing once again. Tamaki stated that she would be receiving treatment during her current activities and that her plans for her upcoming musical would continue as planned. Due to her condition, she had to cut back her performance set-list while promoting for Everlasting Love.

== Discography ==
=== Albums ===
==== Studio albums ====
Title	Album details	Peak chart positions	Sales	Certifications
Title	Album details	JPN	Sales	Certifications
Greeting	Released: February 25, 2004; Label: Sony Music Records; Formats: CD+DVD, CD, digital download, streaming	5	JPN: 140,000	RIAJ (phy.): Gold
Make Progress	Released: May 11, 2005; Label: Sony Music Records; Formats: CD+DVD, CD, digital download, streaming	1	JPN: 160,000	RIAJ (phy.): Gold
Speciality	Released: July 12, 2006; Label: Sony Music Records; Formats: CD+DVD, CD, digital download, streaming	1	JPN: 85,000	RIAJ (phy.): Gold
Don't Stay	Released: April 23, 2008; Label: Sony Music Records; Formats: CD, digital download, streaming	13	JPN: 18,000	
Step	Released: February 24, 2010; Label: Universal Music Japan; Formats: CD+DVD, CD, digital download, streaming	55	JPN: 3,500	
Ready	Released: February 23, 2011; Label: Universal Music Japan; Formats: CD+DVD, CD, digital download, streaming	63	JPN: 2,500	
Singularity	Released: March 13, 2024; Label: Sunrise Music Label; Formats: CD, digital download, streaming	32	JPN: 1,000	

==== Compilation albums ====
Title	Album details	Peak chart positions	Sales	Certifications
Title	Album details	JPN	Sales	Certifications
Graduation: Singles	Greatest hits album; Released: November 29, 2006; Label: Sony Music Records; Formats: CD+DVD, CD, digital download, streaming	6	JPN: 85,000	RIAJ (phy.): Gold
Tamaki Nami Reproduct Best	Remix album; Released: March 25, 2009; Label: Sony Music Records; Formats: CD, digital download, streaming	84	JPN: 2,500	
NT Gundam Cover	Cover album; Released: June 25, 2014; Label: Imperial Records; Formats: CD, digital download, streaming	38	JPN: 5,000	

=== Singles ===
==== 2000s ====
List of singles as lead artist
Title	Year	Peak chart positions		Sales	Certifications	Album
Title	Year	JPN	JPN Hot 100 (Note: The Billboard Japan Hot 100 chart was established in 2008.)	Sales	Certifications	Album
"Believe"	2003	5		JPN: 200,000	RIAJ (phy.): Platinum	Greeting
"Realize"	2003	3		JPN: 150,000	RIAJ (phy.): Gold; RIAJ (dig.): Gold	Greeting
"Prayer"	2003	12		JPN: 35,000		Greeting
"Shining Star: Wasurenai Kara"	2004	9		JPN: 45,000		Greeting
"Daitan ni Ikimashō: Heart & Soul"	2004	13		JPN: 30,000		Make Progress
"Reason"	2004	2		JPN: 180,000	RIAJ (phy.): Gold; RIAJ (dig.): Gold	Make Progress
"Fortune"	2005	6		JPN: 65,000		Make Progress
"Heroine"	2005	6		JPN: 30,000		Make Progress
"Get Wild"	2005	7		JPN: 50,000		Speciality
"My Way" / "Sunrize"	2006	18		JPN: 20,000		Speciality
"Result"	2006	5		JPN: 40,000		Speciality
"Sanctuary"	2006	12		JPN: 19,000		Speciality
"Cross Season"	2007	23		JPN: 9,000		Don't Stay
"Brightdown"	2007	8		JPN: 25,000		Don't Stay
"Winter Ballades" (Note: Single composed of the songs "Promise," "Christmas Time," and "Winter Fall.")	2007	19	— (Note: "Winter Ballades" did not enter the Billboard Japan Hot 100, but peaked at number 68 on the Top Singles Sales chart.)	JPN: 8,500		Don't Stay
"Give Me Up"	2009	18	21	JPN: 8,000		Step
"Friends!"	2009	25	57	JPN: 5,000		Step
"Moshimo Negai ga..."	2009	20	— (Note: "Moshimo Negai ga..." did not enter the Billboard Japan Hot 100, but peaked at number 27 on the Top Singles Sales chart.)	JPN: 4,000		Step
"—" denotes a recording that did not chart or was not released in that territory.

==== 2010s ====
List of singles as lead artist
Title	Year	Peak chart positions		Sales	Album
Title	Year	JPN	JPN Hot 100	Sales	Album
"Omoide ni Naru no?" (Note: Released under the name "Nami.")	2010	138	—	JPN: 500	Step
"Missing You (Time To Love)" (feat. Kwangsoo, Jihyuk, Geon-il from Supernova)	2011	42	14	JPN: 1,500	Ready
"Lady Mind"	2012	76	27	JPN: 1,000	Non-album singles
"Paradise"	2012	78	—	JPN: 600	Non-album singles
"Real"	2013	75	33	JPN: 700	Non-album singles
"Vivid Telepathy"	2014	98	—	JPN: 900	Non-album singles
"Everlasting Love"	2015	125	—	JPN: 400	Non-album singles
"All-ways" (with Yohske Yamamoto)	2016	128	—	JPN: 400	Non-album singles
"—" denotes a recording that did not chart or was not released in that territory.

==== 2020s ====
List of singles as lead artist
Title	Year	Peak chart positions		Sales	Album
Title	Year	JPN	JPN Hot 100	Sales	Album
"Connect the Truth"	2020	41	— (Note: "Connect the Truth" did not enter the Billboard Japan Hot 100, but peaked at number 40 on the Top Singles Sales chart.)	JPN: 1,000	Singularity
"Break the Chain"	2020	—	—		Singularity
"Open the Gate" (with Hiroshi Kitadani)	2021	—	—		Singularity
"Resolve"	2023	—	—		Singularity
"Ashita no Yūki ni Hi wa Noboru"	2023	—	—		Singularity
"Reborn"	2024	17	— (Note: "Reborn" did not enter the Billboard Japan Hot 100, but peaked at number 18 on the Top Singles Sales chart.)	JPN: 7,000	Singularity
"Believe" (from The First Take)	2024	—	—		Non-album singles
"Harukaze"	2026	—	—		Non-album singles
"—" denotes a recording that did not chart or was not released in that territory.

=== Other compilation songs ===
Note: The songs below are tributes to several famous Japanese artists and are not presented in any of Nami Tamaki's singles or albums.

- "Blue Jeans Memory" – Matchy Tribute (January 25, 2006)
- "Storm" – Luna Sea Memorial Cover Album -Re:birth- (December 19, 2007)
- "Tonari no Totoro by Jazzida Grande feat. Nami Tamaki" – Ghibli meets Lovers Reggae (July 8, 2009)

=== DVDs ===
- Believe DVD – November 12, 2003
- Realize DVD – December 17, 2003
- Greeting DVD – May 19, 2004
- Make Progress DVD – July 6, 2005
- NAMI TAMAKI 2nd CONCERT "Make Progress～road to～ – October 5, 2005
- Speciality DVD – August 30, 2006
- NAMI TAMAKI Best CONCERT "My Graduation" – June 13, 2007
- Gundam OP/END COLLECTION Volume2–21st Century – August 25, 2009
- STEP DVD – February 17, 2010
- Monthly NEO Nami Tamaki DVD – February 24, 2011

== Performances ==
- Concert
  - Pacific Media Expo 2004, opening for T.M.Revolution
  - FanimeCon 2004, MusicFest event
  - Animax Musix Fall 2010
  - Anime Friends 2025, São Paulo, Brazil
- Musical
  - "Sweet Charity" (スウィート・チャリティ) as Charity
  - "High School Musical ON STAGE!" (JPN ver.) (ハイスクール・ミュージカルON STAGE!) as Gabriella Montez
  - "All Shook Up" (JPN ver.)
  - "Anything Goes" as Erma
- Movie
  - Lovely Complex (ラブ★コン) as Nobuko Ishihara (石原信子, Ishihara Nobuko)
- Stageshow
  - Sengoku Basara 3 Utage as Oichi
- Musical
  - Faust ~The Last Crusade~ as Princess Margarete

== Commercial tie-ins ==
=== Animation, Comics, and Games (ACG) ===
- Gundam Seed, Gundam Seed Destiny and related franchise: "Believe", "Realize", "Reason", "Result", "IDentity" (Collaborated in the Gundam SEED C.E. 73 Δ Astray comic project
- Radiata Stories, a PS2 role-playing game from Square Enix: "Fortune"
- Super Robot Wars J, a GBA turn-based strategy game from Banpresto: "Castaway"
- Kiba: "Sanctuary"
- D.Gray-man: "Brightdown"
- Yattaman (2008 remake version): "Give Me Up"
- Arc Rise Fantasia, a Wii role-playing video game from Marvelous Entertainment: "Negai Hoshi" (願い星)
- Valhalla Knights: Eldar Saga, a Wii ARPG from Marvelous Entertainment: "Moshimo Negai ga..." (もしも願いが．．．)
- Sengoku Basara 3 Utage: "Real"
- Argevollen: "Vivid Telepathy"
- Vampire Holmes: "Everlasting Love"

=== TV Shows and others ===
- Matthew's Best Hit TV: "Shining Star ☆忘れないから☆"
- NTT DoCoMo Commercial: "DreamerS"
- Sports Urugusu: "CROSS SEASON"
- High School Musical 2: "You Are the Music in Me (Japanese version)"
- NNN News Real-time: "Together"
- Palty Commercial: "Friends!"
- Utastar !! (歌スタ !! ): "Omoide ni naru no?" (思い出になるの？)
- Ultraman Z (tokusatsu show): "Connect the Truth"

== Awards ==
- The 18th Japan Gold Disc Award (第18回日本ゴールドディスク大賞): New Artist of the Year (2004)
