= Super Robot Wars J =

2005 video game

- Developer: A.I
- Publisher: Banpresto
- Platform: Game Boy Advance
- Release: JP: September 15, 2005
- Genre: Tactical role-playing game
- Mode: Single-player

Super Robot Wars J (スーパーロボット大戦J, Sūpā Robotto Taisen Jei) is a tactical role-playing video game released for the Game Boy Advance developed by A.I and published by Banpresto.

== Gameplay ==
Judgement features several systems used in previous games, as well as new ones. They include:

- Favorite Series
  - First introduced in Super Robot Wars MX, this system allows players to increase the number of possible upgrade steps for chosen units and increases the number of experience points and credits one can earn. Unlike MX, three series can be chosen at once and an additional three during subsequent replays, until all 15 series have been chosen. Also, bonus level are variable depends on the series, series that have more units or bigger contribution to the story (especially Brain Powerd, Gundam SEED and Nadesico this time) receives less bonus than series having fewer units.
- Relationship Bonuses
  - First introduced in Super Robot Wars 64, units earn better dodging and attacking stats by standing adjacent to a character they are emotionally attached with, usually from the same series. This is determined by either blue orbs (friendship) or hearts (attraction).
- Unit Switching
  - A new system, whenever a unit docks with any battleship, it has the option of switching out with another unit not initially sortied. However, the number of times this is possible for a battleship can be upgraded to a maximum of three.
- BGM Change
  - First introduced in Super Robot Taisen: Original Generation 2 and refined in the 3rd Super Robot Wars Alpha, players can switch a playable character's theme song with another, allowing almost any song to play for a given unit. Songs for some special attacks will always override the chosen music.
- Replay Bonuses
  - Upon completion of a playthrough, starting another run of the game using previously completed data allows the player to choose the protagonist's set of "Spirit Commands", character abilities akin to magic spells. Points allocated to character stats are kept, including unit and weapon upgrades on subsequent replays.
- Fully Animated Sprites
  - All attacks are now fully animated instead of only a few certain attacks getting additional animation.

== Banpresto Originals ==
=== Characters ===
Judgement offers players the choice of playing one of two protagonists, each following the game's storyline from a different front:

- Touya Shiun is an ordinary 17-year-old high-school student, with a straight sense of justice, but nevertheless, a coward, and not the type to act on chance. At first, he is pushed by his partners to fight, even though reluctantly, he feels he cannot be trusted. As the story progresses, Touya begins to fight on his own will. As of Super Robot Wars Original Generation: The Moon Dwellers, he is voiced by Nobunaga Shimazaki.
- Calvina Coulange is a 22-year-old former Alliance Space Forces Second Lieutenant pilot. During her days at the military, her superior piloting skills earns her the nickname "White Lynx" among her peers. After graduation, she becomes a contract employee at the moon branch of the Ashalley Kreutzer Corporation. As part of the weapons development section, she serves as the appraisal to the newly developed mobile weapon and is assigned as the instructor to the pilots. However, two months before Judgement's story begins, the branch is destroyed by an unknown enemy attack. All developmental data, mecha, staff and equipment are lost. Though seriously injured, Calvina is the sole survivor of the incident. Once a cheerful girl, the incident has left her reserved and quiet. As of Super Robot Wars Original Generation: The Moon Dwellers, she is voiced by Masumi Asano.

Prior to participating in battles, players are offered a choice to select which co-pilot to accompany the chosen protagonist in the machine. Each co-pilot possess different skills and sets of "Spirit Commands" to utilize in different situations:

- Katia Grignarl tends to be quiet and emotionally stable, but is rather stubborn, and confronts the protagonist several times. She tends to speak seriously and proposes to do the most daring and dangerous things. Among the three co-pilots, she appears to be the eldest, and the leader among them. As of Super Robot Wars Original Generation: The Moon Dwellers, she is voiced by Yoko Hikasa.
- Festenia Muse, though extremely bad-mouthed, is a very cheerful girl. Occasionally addressed as "Tenia", she loves to tease other people to test out their reactions. On the other hand, she tries to overcome her insecurity of others with her cheerfulness and carries an enormous appetite. As of Super Robot Wars Original Generation: The Moon Dwellers, she is voiced by Nao Toyama.
- Melua Melna Meia lacks self-insistency, but is unpredictable, yet intelligent. Melua is always the one to stop any argument between Katia and Tenia and will resort to tears if the fight is not resolved. However, out of the three, she is perhaps the most emotionally stable and loves all kind of sweets, especially chocolate. As of Super Robot Wars Original Generation: The Moon Dwellers, she is voiced by Ai Kayano.

=== Original Mecha ===
- Bellzelute, a real robot designed for long-range combat. It carries no melee weapons, but compensates for its wide variety of long-range attacks
  - Bellzelute Brigandy is the Bellzelute's upgrade. Fitted with a module comparable to the GP03 "Dendrobium Orchis", its capabilities exceed its original, with the addition of using the module as a weapon.
- Coustwell, the second real robot intended for fast-paced close combat. While it is not known for its range, it makes up for its ability to use any of its weapons immediately upon movement.
  - Coustwell Brachium is the Coustwell's upgrade, becoming a strictly melee combat-type machine, rather than a balanced hybrid, like its predecessor.
- Granteed, a super robot easily identifiable by its huge size and its assortment of weapons. This heavily armored machine has the strongest melee-based attacks compared against the Bellzelute and Coustwell.
  - Granteed Dracodeus is the Granteed's upgrade. Merged with the Basileus module, it takes the appearance of a mythical dragon king.
- Vorlent, the second super robot commonly used by enemy commanders. However, this unit is selectable only if the player finishes the game using the three previous units.
  - Raftclans is the Vorlent's upgrade. It is commonly used by enemy generals.

== Series Included ==
- Banpresto Originals (not a TV or movie series)
- Blue Comet SPT Layzner
- Brain Powerd
- Dancouga – Super Beast Machine God
- Full Metal Panic! (Debut)
  - Full Metal Panic? Fumoffu (Debut)
- Gundam
  - Mobile Fighter G Gundam
  - Mobile Suit Gundam SEED
- Hades Project Zeorymer
- Martian Successor Nadesico
- Mazinkaiser (OVA)
  - Mazinkaiser: Deathmatch! The Great General of Darkness (Debut)
- Robot Romance Trilogy
  - Chōdenji Robo Combattler V
  - Chōdenji Machine Voltes V
- Tekkaman Blade (Debut)
