= Ready (Nami Tamaki album) =

Studio album by Nami Tamaki
- Released: February 23, 2011 (Japan)
- Genre: Dance-pop, pop, J-pop
- Label: Universal Music Japan

Nami Tamaki chronology
STEP (2010)	Ready (2011)

Ready is the sixth studio album released by Tamaki Nami. The album was released in two version: a CD+DVD Limited Edition and a CD Only Edition. The album includes the single previously released, Missing You: Time To Love. The song "Missing You: Time to Love" is a Japanese remake/cover of the Korean song "TTL (Time to Love)", originally released by T-ara and Supernova; the song features original lyrics and a similar tune to the original version of the song. The song "Good-bye" is a Japanese remake/cover of the Korean song "Bye Bye" also by T-ara.

== Track listing ==
CD track list
No.	Title	Length
1.	"Girlie Night" (ft. Girl's Day)	3:31
2.	"Missing You: Time to Love" (feat. Kwangsoo, Jihyuk, Geonil, from Choshinsei)	3:32
3.	"My Boy"	3:04
4.	"Tsuyogaritoka, Iranaindane." (強がりとか、いらないんだね。)	4:02
5.	"Just Dance"	3:16
6.	"My Style"	3:38
7.	"Signal"	3:28
8.	"Good-bye"	3:34

DVD track list
No.	Title	Length
1.	"Missing You: Time to Love" (feat. Kwangsoo, Jihyuk, Geonil, from Choshinsei)	3:31
