= Believe (Nami Tamaki song) =

- First Press Edition Cover

Single by Nami Tamaki

from the album Greeting
- Released: April 23, 2003
- Genre: J-pop, trance
- Songwriters: Lyrics: Saeko Nishio; Music: Kichio Aoi

Nami Tamaki singles chronology
"Believe" (2003)	"Realize" (2003)

Regular Edition Cover

"Believe" is the debut single by Nami Tamaki, released April 23, 2003. It went to number 5 on the Oricon Singles Chart, charting for 24 weeks. Tamaki was chosen through a Sony Music audition as the vocalist for the song. This song was also used as the third opening theme for Kidou Senshi Gundam Seed.

== Track listing ==
1. "Believe" (lyrics: Saeko Nishio, music: Kichio Aoi)
2. "Complete" (lyrics: Natsumi Watanabe, music: Kazuhiro Hara)
3. "Can You Feel My Love" (lyrics: Yuuka Matsumoto, music: Yuusuke Asada)
4. "Believe" (Instrumental)

== Versions ==
- "Believe" (Album Version)

This is used in the album Greeting as track number 2.

- "Believe" (Single Version)

This is used in the single "Believe" as track number 1.

- "Believe" (Mobilesuit Gundam Seed Complete Best Version)

This is used in the album Mobilesuit Gundam Seed Complete Best Version as track number 4.

- "Believe" (TV-Size Version)

This is used in the beginning of Gundam Seed during episodes 27–40. This is the 3rd opening of Kidou Senshi Gundam Seed. It is not located on any album or single, only on the show.

- "Believe" (Evidence01 Mix)

This is a remix found on the album Greeting. It is track number 13. It is also found on the single "Believe Reproduction ~GUNDAM SEED EDITION~" as track number 1.

- "Believe" (Freedom G Control Mix)

This is a remix found on the album Mobilesuit Gundam Seed Complete Best as track number 10. It is also located in the Gundam Seed reproduction single, "Believe Reproduction ~GUNDAM SEED EDITION~" as track number 2.

- "Believe" (Instrumental)

This is the version where Nami is not singing, but only the instruments are playing. It is track number 4 on the single "Believe".

- "Believe" (2013)

The new version for the 10th anniversary of the song.
