= Oneness M =

Studio album by Sugizo
- Released: November 29, 2017
- Genre: Alternative rock; experimental rock
- Length: 60:00
- Language: Japanese
- Label: Universal Music Japan

Sugizo chronology
Oto (2016)	Oneness M (2017)	Love & Tranquility (2020)

Oneness M is the sixth studio album by Japanese musician Sugizo, released on November 29, 2017. The album is a celebration of the musician's 20-year career. It was released in two editions: a regular edition and a limited edition with the instrumental version of all songs. Sugizo invited ten well-known vocalists to sing for the album, such as Ryuichi, Kyo, Toshi, etc.

== Writing ==
The track "Towa" was originally written to be on Luna Sea's 2013 album A Will, while "Phoenix ~Hinotori~" was originally written for X Japan's unreleased sixth album. The lyrics for each song were written by their guest, with the exception of "Daniela" feat. Yoohei Kawakami, where the lyrics were written by Takuro and "Voice", which had previously been released on Sugizo's 2003 album C:Lear with lyrics written by him.

In 2019, Sugizo re-recorded "Hikari no Hate" with Aina the End on vocals to be used as one of the ending themes of Mobile Suit Gundam: The Origin - Advent of the Red Comet. It was later included on his 2020 album Love & Tranquility.

== Charts ==
The album peaked at number twenty-three on the Oricon Albums Chart.

== Tracklist ==
All music is composed by Sugizo

No.	Title	Feat.	Length
1.	"Towa" (永遠)	Ryuichi	8:16
2.	"Daniela"	Yoohei Kawakami	5:01
3.	"Zessai" (絶彩)	Kyo	6:34
4.	"Rebellmusik"	K Dub Shine	5:35
5.	"Meguri Aerunara" (巡り逢えるなら)	Teru	5:07
6.	"Phoenix ~Hinotori~"	Toshi	6:34
7.	"Garcia"	Toshi-Low	4:49
8.	"Kanjyō" (感情漂流)	Jinsei Tsuji	5:17
9.	"Voice"	Kiyoharu	4:58
10.	"Hikari no Hate" (光の涯)	Morrie	7:54
Total length:			1:00:00

== Production ==
- Produced by Sugizo
- Stewart Hawks - Mastering engineer in the limited edition
