= Make Progress =

Studio album by Nami Tamaki
- Released: May 11, 2005 (Japan)
- Genres: Dance-pop, pop, J-pop
- Label: Sony Music Japan

Nami Tamaki chronology
| "Greeting" (2004) | Make Progress (2005) | "Speciality" (2006) |

Make Progress is the second album from Japanese pop singer Nami Tamaki. The album was Tamaki's first Oricon number-one album. It also reached number two on Billboard Japan's album chart.

== Track listing ==
Source: Oricon profile

1. Fly Away
2. Reason
3. Daybreak
4. Future Step
5. Truth
6. 大胆にいきましょう↑Heart & Soul↑ (Daitan ni Ikimashou)
7. Make Progress ~Instrumental~
8. Heroine
9. 暗闇物語 (Kurayami Monogatari)
10. You
11. Fortune
12. DreamerS
13. Distance
14. Reason (Reproduction ~flash forward mix~) (bonus track)

== Trivia ==
- "大胆にいきましょう↑Heart & Soul↑ (Daitan ni Ikimashou)" is a cover version from "A Perfect Match", a song by the Swedish pop group A-Teens.
