= Storm (Luna Sea song) =

Single by Luna Sea

from the album Shine
- B-side: "Kono Sekai no Hate de"
- Released: April 15, 1998
- Genre: Alternative rock
- Length: 11:02
- Label: Universal
- Songwriter: Luna Sea
- Producer: Luna Sea

Luna Sea singles chronology
"In Silence" (1996)	"Storm" (1998)	"Shine" (1998)

Music video
- "Storm" on YouTube

"Storm" is the ninth single by Japanese rock band Luna Sea, released by Universal on April 15, 1998. Their first release after switching record labels from MCA Victor, "Storm" became the band's fourth number 1 single on the Oricon Singles Chart. It was certified Platinum by the RIAJ and was the 29th best-selling single of the year with 720,370 copies sold, which makes it the band's best-selling single. It was used as the April 1998 theme song for NHK's music television show Pop Jam.

== Composition ==
"Storm" was originally composed by bassist J. Guitarist Sugizo cited "Storm" as one of the songs where he tried to replicate the "psychedelic feel of shoegaze bands" by using effects, "like playing fast with a wah-wah pedal, or using tape-echo and harmonizers. I couldn't figure out how they did it, so I just made it into my own thing." He used a 1956 Gibson Les Paul Custom to record the song.

== Cover artwork ==
Like most of Luna Sea's releases, the artwork to the "Storm" single was designed by Ken Sakaguchi. After J told him that the keyword for the visual image was "light", Sakaguchi kept thinking about photorealism and consulted his graphic collaborator Nicci Keller. Deciding on a beach location, it took them four attempts over a weekend to capture the perfect moment of the sun first appearing.

== Reception ==
"Storm" was Luna Sea's fourth number 1 single on the Oricon Singles Chart and charted for 10 weeks. It was certified Platinum in April 1998 by the RIAJ for sales over 400,000. "Storm" was the 29th best-selling single of the year with 720,370 copies sold, making it the band's best-selling single. The song's music video was nominated for the International Viewer's Choice - Japan award at the 1998 MTV Video Music Awards. In a 2021 poll conducted by Net Lab of 4,805 people on their favorite Luna Sea song, "Storm" came in tenth place with 191 votes.

== Track listing ==
All tracks written and arranged by Luna Sea.

No.	Title	Length
1.	"Storm"	5:05
2.	"Kono Sekai no Hate de" (この世界の果てで)	5:57

== Personnel ==
Luna Sea

- Ryuichi – vocals
- Sugizo – guitar, violin
- Inoran – guitar
- J – bass
- Shinya – drums, percussion

Production

- Hitoshi Hiruma – recording and mixing
- Yasuji Maeda – mastering

== Cover version ==
The song was covered by pop singer Nami Tamaki on 2007's Luna Sea Memorial Cover Album -Re:birth-.

It was also covered by Lolita23q on the compilation Crush! -90's V-Rock Best Hit Cover Songs-, which was released on January 26, 2011 and features current visual kei bands covering songs from bands that were important to the '90s visual kei movement.
