= Sugizo =

Japanese musician (born 1969)

Sugizo 杉原有音
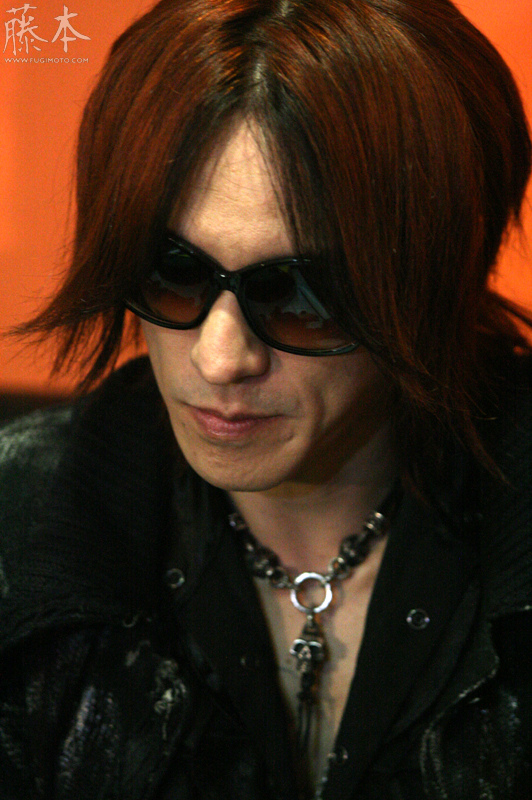
- Sugizo in 2011

Background information
- Born: Yasuhiro Sugihara (杉原 康弘); July 8, 1969 (age 57); Hadano, Kanagawa, Japan
- Genres: Rock; heavy metal; psychedelia; electronica; world; experimental; ambient
- Occupations: Musician; songwriter; composer; record producer; actor; writer; activist
- Instruments: Guitar; violin
- Works: Sugizo discography
- Years active: 1986–present
- Labels: Cross/Polydor; Embryo; Nippon Crown; Sephirot; Universal; Avex Trax; Wakyo
- Member of: Luna Sea; X Japan; Juno Reactor; The Last Rockstars
- Formerly of: S.K.I.N.; Stop Rokkasho
- Website: sugizo.com

Japanese name
- Kanji: 杉原有音
- Hiragana: すぎはら ゆうね
Transcriptions
- Romanization: Sugihara Yūne

Yūne Sugihara (Japanese: 杉原有音, Hepburn: Sugihara Yūne), born Yasuhiro Sugihara (杉原 康弘) and better known by his stage name Sugizo, is a Japanese musician, songwriter, composer and record producer. He is best known as the lead guitarist and violinist of the rock band Luna Sea since 1989.

Sugizo started his solo career in 1997 and has since collaborated with a variety of different artists. He formed the psychedelic jam band Shag in 2002, the rock duo The Flare in 2004, and the electronica duo S.T.K (Sensual Technology Kooks) in 2005. In 2007 he became a member of the international trance/world music act Juno Reactor, and of the Japanese rock supergroup S.K.I.N. Sugizo officially joined the rock band X Japan in 2009, and became a member of the supergroup The Last Rockstars in 2022.

In addition to being known for experimenting with many musical genres, mostly rock, psychedelic and electronica, he is known for his political views and for being an anti-war, anti-nuclear, and environmental activist.

== Early life and musical education ==
Yasuhiro Sugihara was born on July 8, 1969, in Hadano, Kanagawa, in Japan. His Manchukuo-born father played trumpet in the Tokyo Metropolitan Symphony Orchestra, and his mother played cello in the same orchestra. He has a younger sister, who was the drummer in a band with Sugizo's future Luna Sea bandmates J and Inoran. From a young age, Sugizo was brought up on classical music and studied classical music theory. At the age of three, by his father's initiative, he started to learn to play the violin. He practiced it for 3 hours per day, but without the right type of music or composer, began to hate playing music, and coercion from his parents aggravated his feeling of repulsion. The situation persisted until the age of ten. His early favorite composers included Beethoven, Bartók, Liszt and J.S. Bach.

When Sugizo was eleven or twelve years old, he began to play the trumpet. He preferred the trumpet's "dirty" image from the 1950s through the 1970s over playing the violin, which was seen as something for higher-class people. During his junior high school days, he became exposed to non-classical music types, such as the Japanese synthpop group Yellow Magic Orchestra, the British new wave group Japan, David Bowie's glam rock, and the London punk scene, forming his attraction to rock'n'roll. Sugizo's parents divorced when he was in high school, and his father moved out. He has a good relationship with his mother and has since reconciled with his father, who has another family.

== Career ==
=== 1986–1996: Early bands and Luna Sea ===
Despite his father's disapproval, Sugizo acquired a bass guitar and an electric guitar and began to teach himself how to play. He has cited three Japanese guitarists as influences; Masami Tsuchiya, Kazumi Watanabe and You. When he was around the age of 17, then in high school, Sugizo with Shinya on drums and Tezya on vocals formed a power metal band called Pinocchio, where he played as the bassist. Since the internal structure of Pinocchio was not cohesive, Sugizo and Shinya left and briefly joined Kashmir in 1988. On January 16, 1989, they both joined another band which performed at the same live houses, called Lunacy, formed by J and Inoran. With the addition of Ryuichi Kawamura, vocalist from the band Slaughter, the five formed the visual kei rock unit Lunacy. Since J was already the bass player and Inoran preferred to play rhythm guitar, Sugizo became the lead guitarist and took on his stage name, which he believes Shinya came up with. Soon they were discovered by hide (then lead guitarist of X Japan), who got them signed by X Japan co-founder Yoshiki, to his independent label Extasy Records, on which they released their debut album in 1991. Upon their first album release, the band changed their name from Lunacy to Luna Sea. They became one of the most famous rock bands in Japan, selling more than ten million records, as well as performing in China and Taiwan.

Sugizo's first solo activity came in 1993, when he wrote his first solo song "Revive" for the album Dance 2 Noise 004 featuring many musicians, including the group M*A*S*S, which consisted of hide, J and Inoran. In the upcoming three years, a variety of lesser-known musical collaborations and contributions took place.

=== 1997–2001: Solo career, Truth? ===
"Lucifer"
A 30-second sample of "Lucifer", the debut single from Truth? (1997). It is an experimental alternative rock song.

"Tell Me Why?"
A 30-second sample of "Tell Me Why?", from Parallel Side of Soundtrack (2001). It is a hard rock song with guitar noise, and beat, featuring Lori Fine on vocals.

"Synchronicity"
A 30-second sample of "Synchronicity", from Soundtrack (2002). It is an instrumental composition which predominantly features Sugizo's violin.

After Luna Sea went on break in 1997, Sugizo started his own solo career and opened the independent label "Cross" to produce other artists and release his own records. He points out that the opening of his record label was one of his very important projects at the time, but not anymore. On July 9, his debut single "Lucifer" was released and reached number 8 on the Oricon singles chart. It was followed by his first solo tour Abstract Day which lasted until the final performance in August at Akasaka Blitz, where he was joined by DJ Krush, Masami Tsuchiya and members of Japan. Then on September 10 he released his second single, "A Prayer", which reached number 7 on the charts. On November 19, his first solo album Truth? was released, and reached number 12 on the album charts. It was met with mixed reviews, largely because of the unexpected musical style which mixed different genres with electronica beats. A variety of artists participated in the album, from Ryuichi Sakamoto and Mick Karn, to Lou Rhodes and Valerie Etienne. Towards the end of the year, remix editions of his two maxi singles and album were released.

As Luna Sea resumed activities, until the band's disbandment, Sugizo collaborated in the studio with actress Miki Nakatani and singers Miu Sakamoto and Vivian Hsu, among others. On August 11, 1999, a compilation album titled Grand Cross 1999, sponsored by Sugizo's record label Cross, was released, featuring many musicians whom he had worked with before, and many for the first time.

He starred in Ken Nikai's movie Soundtrack and composed the music for the film. On November 14, a compilation album inspired by the film, titled Parallel Side of Soundtrack was released, and the following year he released the single "Rest in Peace & Fly Away" featuring Bice on vocals. That same year he produced the music for, as well as danced in, Suichoku no Yume, a production by the popular contemporary dance company H. Art Chaos.

=== 2002–2007: C:Lear, joining Juno Reactor ===
Around late 2001 he formed the solo project Sugizo & the Spank Your Juice, with whom he toured with until 2004 and released three singles; "Super Love", "Dear Life" and "No More Machineguns Play the Guitar", which entered top 50 on the charts. In 2002, he formed the jam band Shag. His acting career also continued in 2002, when he starred in Isao Yukisada's film Rock'n'roll Mishin, and the television series RedЯum, directed by Ken Nikai. In 2003, following the release of "No More Machineguns Play the Guitar", Sugizo released his second album C:Lear. It peaked at the number 56 on the album charts.

In March 2004, Sugizo formed the rock band The Flare with vocalist Yuna Katsuki. He also created a new record label called "Embryo", which received major distribution from Universal Music Group for the music of The Flare. They performed at Earth Day in Tokyo, Japan's largest event devoted to environmental and peaceful causes. The band would last until 2006, releasing four singles and one album. In May 2005, Sugizo organized the event Neo Ascension Groove, with his jam act Shag. In the band he plays guitar, violin and percussion, while the music is avant-garde with concentration on rhythm. Also in 2005, he formed the electro-acoustic duo S.T.K (Sensual Technology Kooks) with author and music producer Tetra Tanizaki. In April 2006, collaborated with trumpeter Toshinori Kondo and celebrated Earth Day by participating in three shows held on April 9, 22 and 23 at the Yoyogi Koen in Tokyo. He later had his first performance with Juno Reactor at the Tokyo Techno Festival, after starting talks with the band in 2005 about a possible collaboration.

In April, he played at the Nagisa Music Festival with Shag. On June 29, 2007, Anime Expo convention in Long Beach, California, hosted the debut performance of S.K.I.N, a supergroup consisting of Sugizo, Yoshiki, Gackt, and Miyavi. In July, Juno Reactor performed as the White Stage's main act on the final day of the Fuji Rock Festival. On December 5, he released the remix album Spirituarise, in which artists from both Japan and overseas remixed his original tracks. On December 24, 2007, Luna Sea reunited for a one-night only concert at the Tokyo Dome.

=== 2008–2009: Cosmoscape, joining X Japan ===
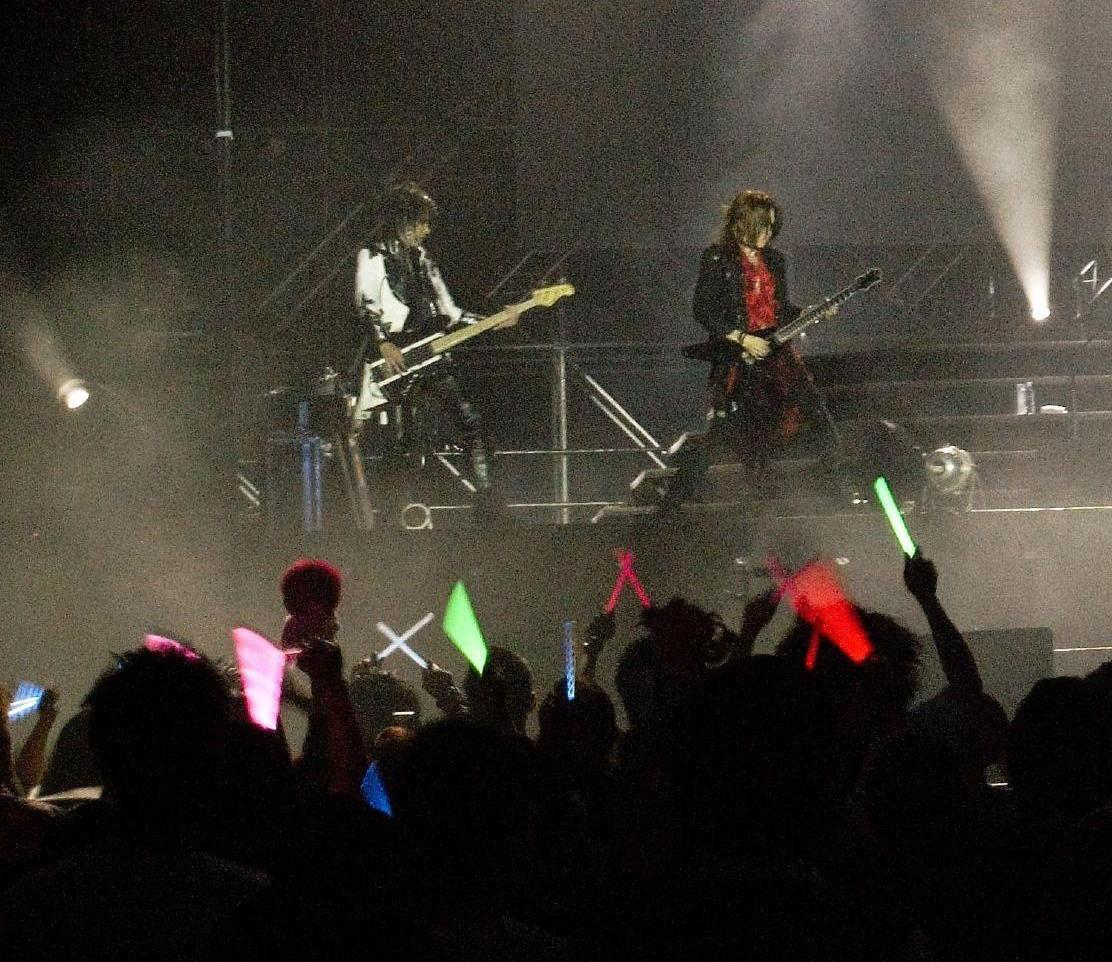
Heath and Sugizo during an X Japan concert in Hong Kong, 2009

On March 28 and 29, 2008, Sugizo played at X Japan's two reunion concerts as a stand-in along Wes Borland and Richard Fortus for the deceased hide. In April, he took part in Juno Reactor's European tour. On May 2, he reunited with Luna Sea again at the "hide memorial summit", a two-day concert in memory of hide, at the Ajinomoto Stadium. On July 23, Sugizo released a greatest hits compilation album titled Cosmoscape. The album featured various music genres, such as rock, trance, jazz, classic, bossa nova, among others, and spans his ten years of solo work. During the year, Sugizo wrote a song titled "Enola Gay", named after the Boeing B-29 bomber that dropped the atomic bomb on Hiroshima. He wrote the song to convey his feelings and thoughts toward the people who suffered from the aftermath of nuclear war, and to the cities of Hiroshima and Nagasaki. As well, that the bomb never must be dropped again, and as his live supporting drummer Greg Ellis is American, singer Origa Russian, and him Japanese, that people from former enemy states can be friends.

In September joined Juno Reactor on the USA leg of their tour. On December 19, at the 1,500-seat Shibuya-AX concert hall, he held the solo concert "Rise to Cosmic Dance" playing songs from Cosmoscape, and including the new song "Enola Gay". On December 31, Sugizo played with X Japan at their New Years countdown gig at Akasaka Blitz.

On May 1, 2009, Sugizo officially joined X Japan as lead guitarist, violinist and backing vocalist. In December, Sugizo with Juno Reactor performed in the Netherlands, twice in Germany, the Czech Republic and Poland. Upon returning to Japan, he released two new digital singles, "Messiah" and "Tell Me Why You Hide the Truth?", via iTunes on December 16. They topped iTunes electronic music charts with first and second place. On December 24 and 25, he held the concert "Next Phase of Cosmic Dance" in Taipei, Taiwan.

=== 2010–2011: Flower of Life, Luna Sea reunion ===
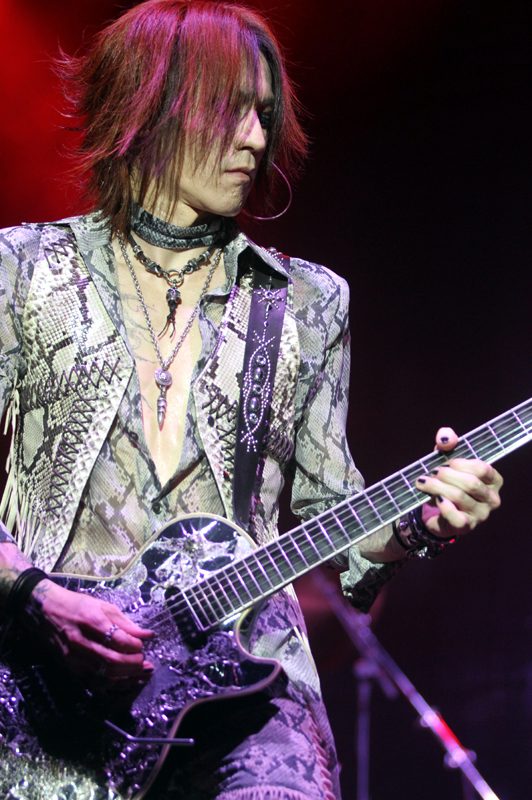
Sugizo performing with X Japan in São Paulo, Brazil 2011

Upon returning to Japan, on January 27 Sugizo released two digital singles, "Fatima" and "Do-Funk Dance", another on February 24 entitled "Prana", which also topped the iTunes electronic charts, and one more on March 31 named "Dear Spiritual Life". Sugizo was the music director and composer of the soundtrack for jidaigeki theatre stage play Nemuri Kyoshiro Buraihikae, featuring Gackt in the main role, which ran for 120 performances across Japan. In April he performed at the Nagisa Music Festival. On July 8, Sugizo announced that he would help his friend Mick Karn, who was diagnosed with cancer, by remixing his song "Missing". The song was renamed "Missing Link" and was available for download in return for a donation on Mick's official website to help fund the expensive medical treatment. Mick Karn died on January 4, 2011.

On August 29, he held a fan club only event called Soul's Mate Day IV. The show featured an acoustic set which was given the name "Soul's Mate Quintet". On August 31, he and Luna Sea attended a press conference in Hong Kong, where they announced that they would be touring worldwide after 10 years of inactivity. From November 5 to 8, Sugizo teamed up with drummers Budgie, Leonard Eto and Mabi, and multi-instrumentalist Knox Chandler in Hong Kong, to participate in a project called "The Butterfly Effect: East-West Percussive Parade", as part of the New Vision Arts Festival. On April 13, 2011, Sugizo released two singles, "No More Nukes Play the Guitar" and "The Edge". On June 29, he released the single "Miranda", followed by "Neo Cosmoscape" on July 27, which was remixed by System 7, "Enola Gay" on August 15, and "Pray for Mother Earth" on September 9, a song he wrote with Toshinori Kondo for Earth Day 2006. On December 14, Sugizo released two albums, Flower of Life and Tree of Life. The first is completely instrumental with psychedelic and electronica songs, while the second includes remixed songs and those done in collaboration with other artists. In December, a four-date tour titled Stairway to the Flower of Life was held, with a concert in Taipei and Hong Kong.

=== 2012–2015: Luna Sea, X Japan ===
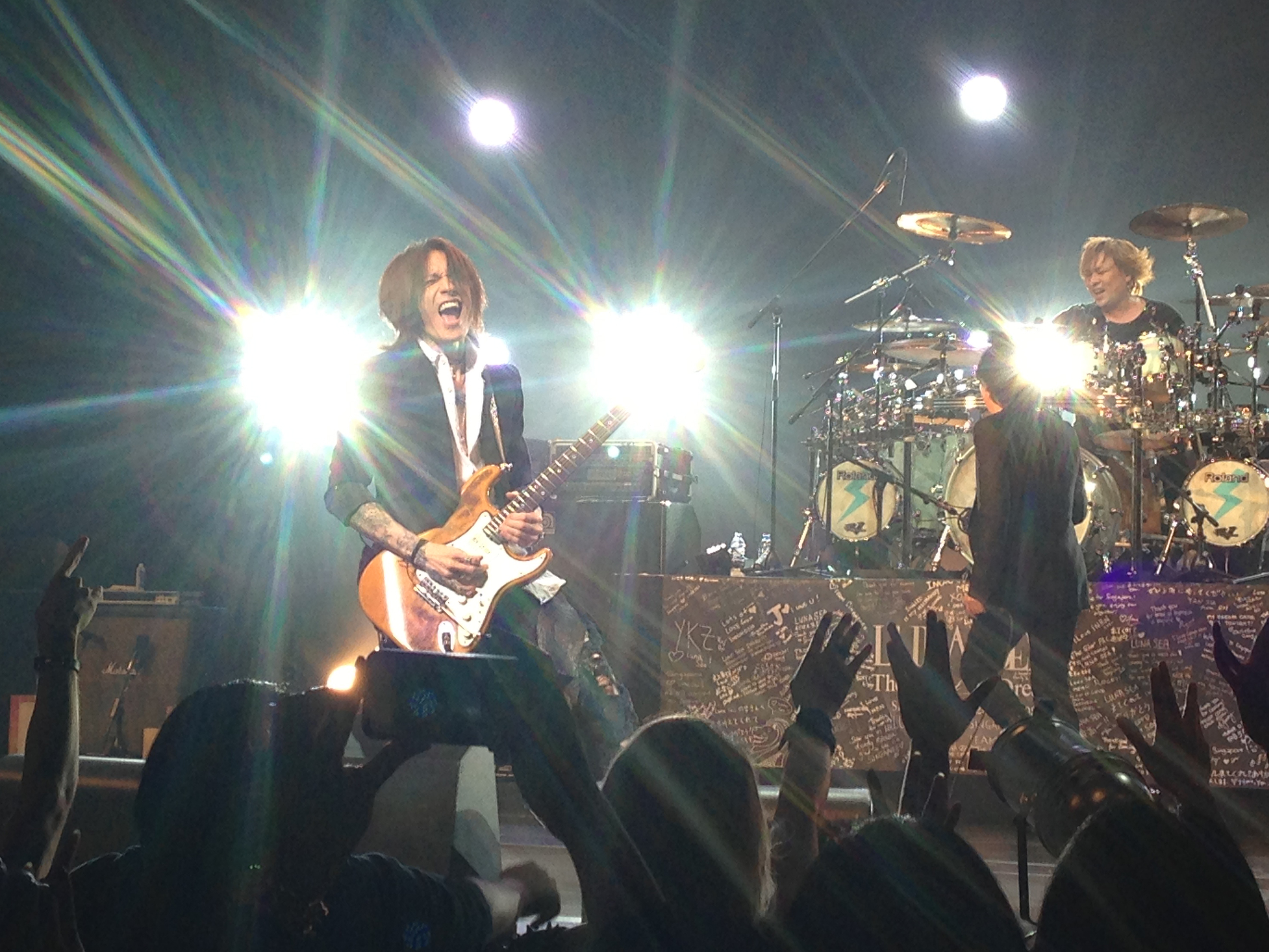
Sugizo with Luna Sea in Singapore, 2013

In 2012, besides being vastly involved with Luna Sea, two digital songs were released, titled "Final of the Messiah" and "Super Love 2012", followed by concerts. The final concert of the small Ascension to the Consientia tour was on September 17, at Akasaka Blitz. On May 30, the original soundtrack composed and produced by Sugizo for the theatre stage play 7 Doors was released, and he also starred in the play, a staging of Bartók's opera Bluebeard's Castle.

On March 6, 2013, his remix album Vesica Pisces was released, including remixes by Juno Reactor, System 7, and The Orb. The Golden Sun of the Great East, the second Juno Reactor studio album featuring Sugizo, followed on April 23. Sugizo was the musical director and composer for the new staging of Mary Shelley's Frankenstein, staged by the same producer of the earlier 7 Doors play. On December 23, the solo tour Thrive to Realize started in Kobe, and ended on December 29 at Shibuya-AX in Tokyo.

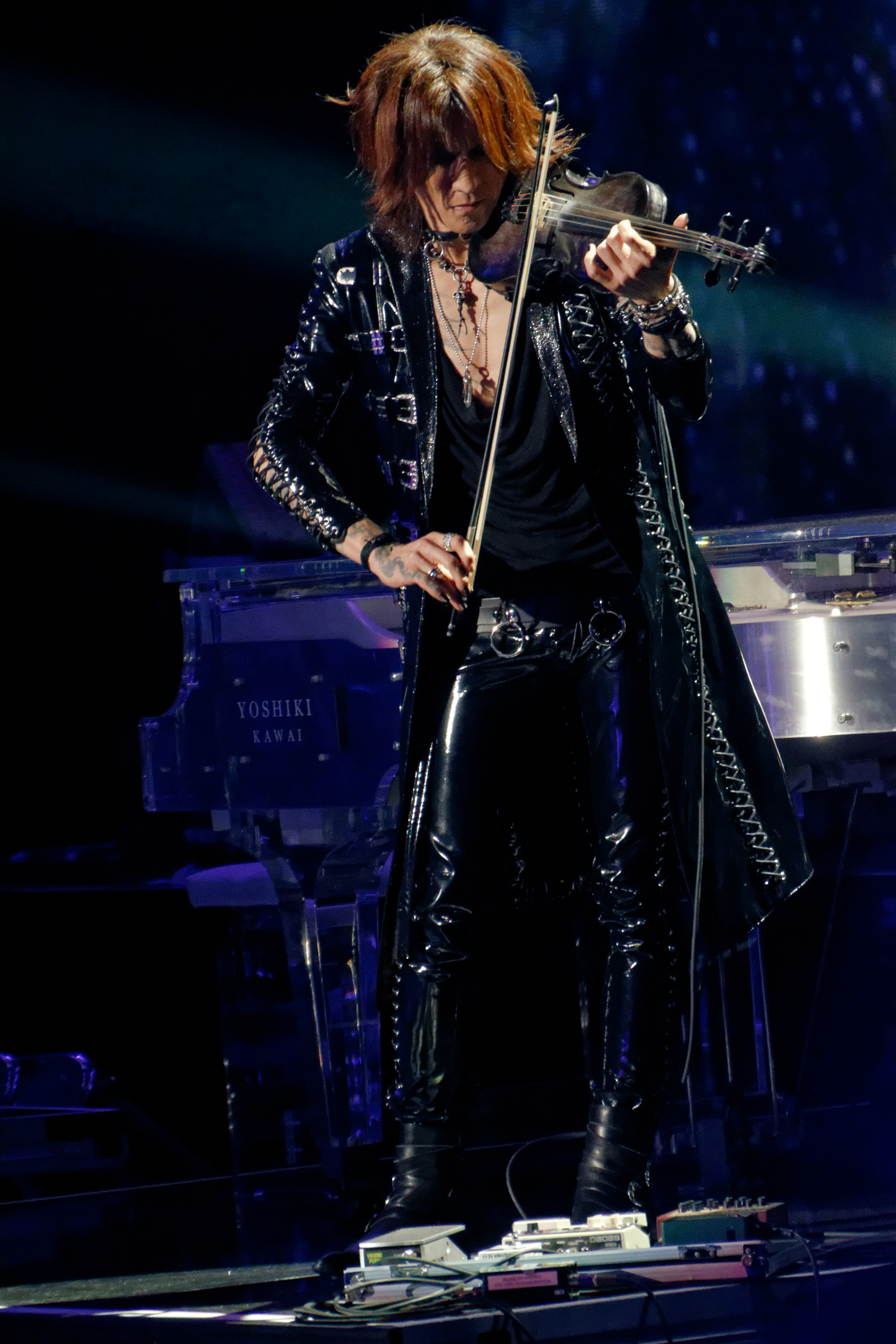
Sugizo playing the violin at Madison Square Garden, 2014

In March 2014, he performed at the 50th anniversary concert of his long-time friend Morrie. On September 24, a compilation of classical music selected by Sugizo was released, some of the tracks re-arranged by him.

In January, Sugizo was a guest at film score composer Ikurō Fujiwara's solo piano concert. On March 11, he took part in the Peace on Earth event in Yoyogi Park for a memorial ceremony of the 2011 Tōhoku earthquake and tsunami. In April, he covered the track Bike, for Maaya Sakamoto's 20th anniversary tribute album, and was scheduled to appear at the Tanz Too Noise Muzik Festival in Hong Kong, but the event was eventually cancelled. In May, he participated in Juno Reactor's short Japanese tour, performing in Osaka, Nagoya and Tokyo. On May 3, he joined fellow Luna Sea member Ryuichi and conductor Ikuro Fujiwara for a 'Symphonic Luna Sea Reboot' concert. In June, he toured extensively with Luna Sea, performing in 32 concerts in 16 cities across Japan. He performed at Makuhari Messe at Luna Sea's Lunatic Fest, also with X Japan. On July 8, his Spiritual Classic Sugizo Selection II compilation album was released. In the same month he performed at the In Order To Dance Vol.1 event, along with Takkyu Ishino and others. X Japan's first domestic tour of Japan in 20 years began with three consecutive dates at Yokohama Arena on December 2, continued with Osaka-jō Hall on December 7, Marine Messe Fukuoka on December 9, Hiroshima Green Arena on December 11, and finished on December 14 at the Nippon Gaishi Hall. They also performed on Kōhaku Uta Gassen for the first time in 18 years.

=== 2016–present ===
On March 11, 2016, he again participated in the free Peace on Earth event, then appeared on Kazumi Watanabe's Guitar is Beautiful KW45 45th anniversary album with the tracks "Round Midnight" and "Island Hop". In April, he performed at Earth Day Tokyo, In June, he held a concert with fellow Luna Sea member Inoran, titled Sugizo vs Inoran Presents Best Bout. In August, a cover of "Life on Mars?" was released as a digital single in tribute to David Bowie. It was followed up by "Lux Aeterna" in September and "Raummusik" in October. X Japan headlined all three nights of the Visual Japan Summit on October 14–16, 2016 at Makuhari Messe. As a celebration of the 20th anniversary of his solo debut, Sugizo set out on a national tour, with his new album, Oto released in November. At the end of December, he performed with Luna Sea at Saitama Super Arena for a two-day concert.

On March 4, 2017, Sugizo took the stage at Wembley Arena in London with X Japan. On May 24 it was revealed that Sugizo has been experimenting with alternative energy sources to power his guitar system, testing the Toyota Mirai and Honda Clarity fuel cells and the system would be put to live test during Luna Sea's May 29 Budokan show. At the end of 2017, Sugizo released a solo album titled Oneness M, featuring a different vocalist on each song, including for example Toshi of X Japan and Teru from Glay. He also asked the vocalists to contribute to the lyrics.

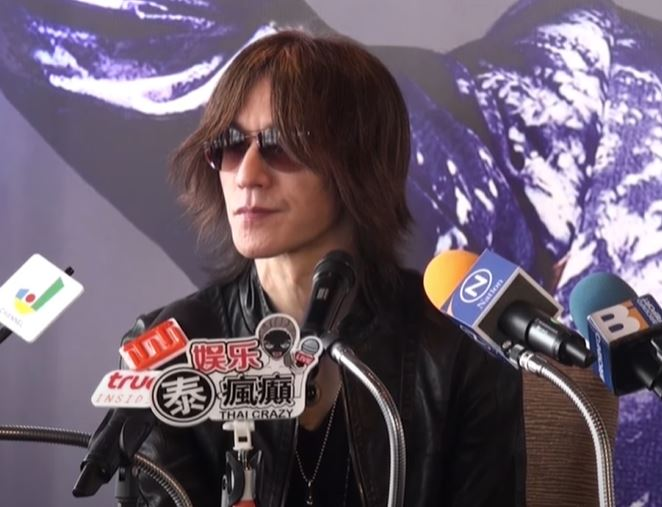
Sugizo in Thailand in 2019

Sugizo produced the theme songs for the 2019 Mobile Suit Gundam: The Origin - Advent of the Red Comet anime. Luna Sea provided the opening themes, but for the ending themes he decided to collaborate with female singers. The first is Sugizo feat. Glim Spanky covering Daisuke Inoue's "Meguriai" (めぐりあい), and the second is a cover of Hiroko Moriguchi's "Mizu no Hoshi e Ai wo Komete" (水の星へ愛をこめて) by Sugizo feat. KOM_I (Wednesday Campanella). The third is the new song "A Red Ray" by Sugizo feat. miwa, which he composed and arranged while she wrote the lyrics. The last is Sugizo feat. Aina the End (BiSH) covering "Hikari no Hate" (光の涯), which was originally on his album Oneness M with lyrics and vocals provided by Morrie. Also in 2019, Sugizo helped produce the Chinese pop rock band VOGUE5.

He provided the theme songs for the July 2020 Gibiate anime; "Gibiate" with the Yoshida Brothers and "Endless" with Maki Ohguro. After 12 years, Sugizo announced the revival of his jam band Shag in November 2020. The group, which includes bassist KenKen (Rize), performed two shows on December 6 and 7. Sugizo's seventh studio album, Love & Tranquility, was released on December 23. In addition to "A Red Ray", Aina the End's version of "Hikari no Hate", and a new version of "Endless", it also features a cover of Dead End's "So Sweet So Lonely" as a tribute to their guitarist You, who died earlier in the year.

In 2022, he released an ambient music EP with Hataken, titled The Voyage to The Higher Self. On July 1, Shag released its first album titled The Protest Jam, edited from live performances and studio recordings. In November 2022, Sugizo was announced as a member of the supergroup The Last Rockstars, along with fellow musicians Yoshiki, Hyde, and Miyavi. The group released their first single, "The Last Rockstars (Paris Mix)", in December of the same year.

In 2023, Sugizo collaborated with Yoshiki to perform an instrumental version of the X Japan song "La Venus" in the documentary film Yoshiki: Under the Sky. In 2025, he served as composer on Daisuke Miyazaki's visual kei-themed film V. Maria, and for the story-driven ice show Hyoen 2025: Kagamon no Yasha, which was directed by Yukihiko Tsutsumi and featured figure skater Daisuke Takahashi and entertainer Takahisa Masuda in double-starring roles. SUGIZO performed live for the majority of the latter, and said collaborating with Tsutsumi was a longstanding wish due to his admiration of the film director's work. On June 10 the official soundtrack was released.

== Personal life ==
Divorced, Sugizo has a daughter named Luna Artemis Sugihara, who was born on April 27, 1996, in Tokyo, Japan. In an interview he said that her birth has transformed him the most and "when you love your daughter, you begin to love all children. Although this might sound grandiose, nothing will make me happier than seeing all children around the world lead joyous lives. I'll be more than satisfied if I can become a tool towards that goal". He briefly dated Taiwanese actress Vivian Hsu.

Sugizo finds all religions interesting and reads many books about them. Since his father was a Buddhist, while his mother was a Protestant, from the young age he has often been in contact with things related to church and Protestantism. Currently, he's more into Buddhism, or more specifically, Buddha himself. Ever since he was little he was curious about occult subjects. While in Elementary School, he became obsessed with the ancient civilizations of Egypt, the Mayas, Easter Islands and the Inca. One of the very important moments were when he was around 18 or 19 years old, after reading Shirley MacLaine's book Out on a Limb, he became even more intrigued about the spiritual world. Noting "As I grew older, I was able to better understand the things that caught my attention when I was young".

Sugizo in the interview said that "there are secrets held by a small elite who control the world... We spend our lives without ever being aware of the truth that is hidden from us", and so through the song "Tell Me Why You Hide The Truth?" meant "We have to liberate freedom and rebuild it by ourselves. I think the world is in need of a revolution. To know what to believe, to know what's really going on in this world we have to take the initiative. That's the sort of signal I'm trying to send". However, he tries to avoid mixing ideology with music because it changes music as such.

=== Activism ===
In 2001, Sugizo participated in Ryuichi Sakamoto's N.M.L. ("No More Landmines"), a campaign to promote awareness of the problems of land mines and promote a ban on them, and helped in the making of the album Zero Landmine. In 2007, he participated in the project Stop Rokkasho, run by the Japanese NGO Boomerang Net and headed up by Sakamoto, created to bring attention to the Rokkasho Reprocessing Plant in Aomori Prefecture. His interest in environmental issues led to attend many environmental events. In 2007, Sugizo became involved with Greenpeace, specifically regarding the whaling in Japan. He gave a name to one humpback whale (Lyra) and followed the Great Whale Trail. After the 2011 Tōhoku earthquake and tsunami, Sugizo continued to yearly volunteer and offer educational assistance to the locals of Ishinomaki and Minamisōma among others.

In 2016, Sugizo made a live performance at a Syrian refugee camps of Zaatari and Azraq in Jordan . Since then one of his guitars has a sticker titled "Save Syria". In 2018, as part of an event promoting cultural exchanges held jointly by Japanese companies and Palestinian NGOs, he made a live performance at an Aida Camp which audience mostly included children of Palestinian refugees in West Bank.

== Equipment ==
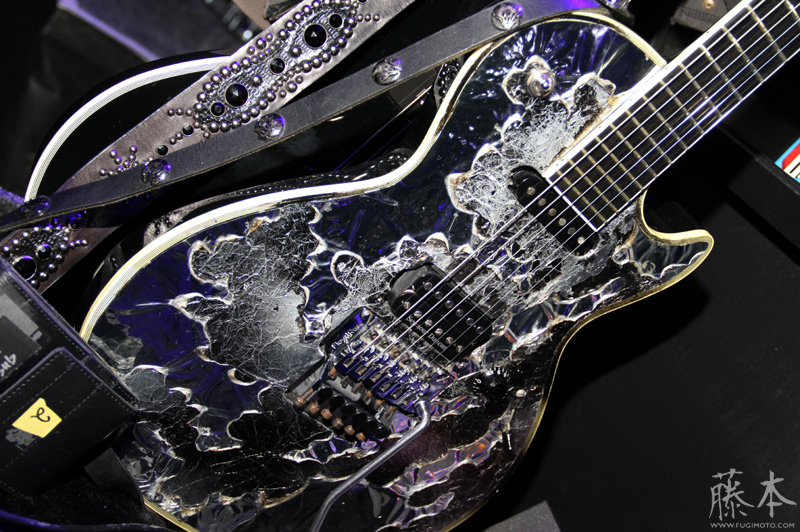
Sugizo's signature ESP Eclipse S-VIII Brilliant MixedMedia guitar at an X Japan concert backstage in 2011

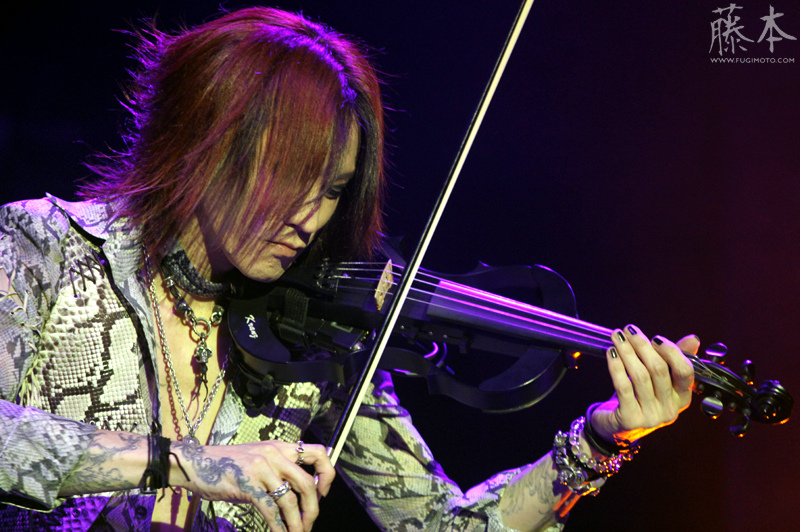
Sugizo playing his ESP Kranz EV-75 violin

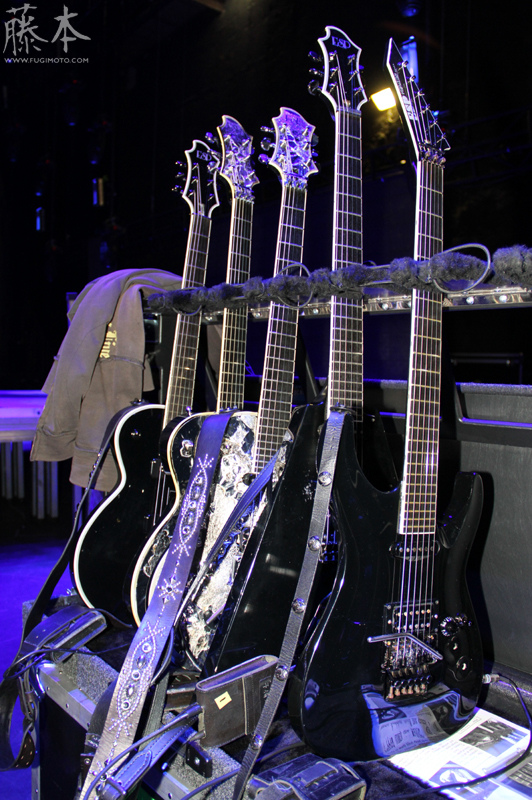
Sugizo's guitar rack at an X Japan concert in 2011

Sugizo almost exclusively uses ESP guitars and has around sixteen signature models with them, mostly with the Eclipse body style or other Gibson-style shapes like the RD and Flying V. But their specs are more similar to the Fender Stratocaster than any Gibson, using single coil pickups, alder bodies and maple necks, 25.5" scale length and tremolo arms. He later favored a P-90 in the bridge position and vintage-style trems, as opposed to the 3 single coils and Floyd Rose trems he used for most of his career. His signature models with the company feature the ESP logo written in the same font as Luna Sea's logo, a feature also found on J's and Inoran's signature models.

In 2021, Sugizo bought a 1961 Gibson ES-330 which has since become his main guitar. He had always wanted an archtop guitar from the ES Series because of its association with jazz. The first one he acquired in the 1990s, a 1959 ES-175, did not "fit" him, so his search continued. He also owns an ES-225 and a 1956 Les Paul Custom. He acquired the latter around 1997 and used it on Luna Sea's Shine, including its singles "Storm" and "I for You".

Sugizo also often uses Stratocaster-type guitars from Navigator, a high-end custom shop related to ESP. His acoustic guitars of choice are usually C.F. Martin Dreadnoughts. He also plays signature electric violins made by Kranz, and his bows are made by CodaBow.

His amps have changed often throughout his career but are generally high-end and boutique brands, including Fender, Marshall, Mesa/Boogie, Matchless, Bogner, Custom Audio Electronics, Divided by 13 and Koch. Most recently he's been using EVH5150's and EVH 4x12" cabs with some additional heads like a Diezel Vh4. He's also performed using an Axe-Fx II.

His effects are numerous and spanning several pedalboards and racks, but important staples are his DigiTech Whammy pedal for pitch effects, and delays and reverbs from various Eventide pedals and the TC Electronic 2290 Digital Delay.

Open table to see signature models
Brand	Model	Notes
ESP	Eclipse S-I	Is a basic model of the Eclipse lineups. Traditional body shape, with 3 single-coiled pick up, all around type, which can respond to various styles of music.
ESP	Eclipse S-II	The Eclipse S-II's feature is the heavy & thick bass sounds of a Humbucker and ample mid-range. When it first time appeared in public, the constitution was of through-neck, EMG-81 for its rear pick-up, and EMG-SA for its front pick-up, made its debut in Luna Sea's 1996 Unending Style tour. Later remodeled edition was introduced in song "Inside You" for 2000 Brand New Chaos tour.
ESP	Eclipse S-III	The Eclipse S-III first time appeared with Luna Sea's 1996 Unending Style tour, when Sugizo played the solo for "Forever & Ever". It was also used in Sugizo's 1996-1997 Abstract Day tour. The present front pick-up was placed on the middle pick-up position with its style like the S-S-H design. The pick-up then was the same as the S-I in the same year, equipped with Lasesensor. On the 1998 Shinging Brightly tour, front pick-ups were placed next to the sustainer driver pick-up. At that time, the front pick-up was equipped on the bridge side. After that, there was an improvement of the driver pick-up by Floyd Rose Sustainer. Since December 1999, it developed into its present style.
ESP	Eclipse S-IV	The Eclipse S-IV is the 12 stringed model of the Eclipse lineup. Used for the song "Velvet" on the 1998 Shining Brightly tour. As with the other models, the same body shape had its feature in the construction of a semi-hollow body with all-maple. The bridge equipped with 12 parts, which can be adjusted to an Octave with independent major & minor strings. This is the sole model equipped with tone control.
ESP	Eclipse S-V	The Eclipse S-V's main feature is the original sound of pick-up P-90, which made its appearance with electric guitars in the 1940s, and being one of the most favorable throughout electric guitar history. Debuted in Slave limited Gig in August 1998. This model lasted from the first stage of the Shining Brightly tour, until Luna Sea's final tour. It supported some main songs like "Storm" and "I for You". Currently is set up with SP-90-1 (Seymour Duncan).
ESP	Eclipse S-VI	The Eclipse S-VI development based on Sugizo's concept, started in 1999 through making prototypes, and was completed in 2001. The 6-stringed model, one octave lower than the other orthodox models, has the same sound range as bass guitars.
ESP	Eclipse S-VII	The Eclipse S-VII was completed in 2000, for making its debut on the Brand New Chaos tour. Was also used for Sugizo & the Spank Your Juice performances. A thin 45mm nut-width was made for the first time for a 7-stringed guitar. Bridge-string pitch 9.6mm, nut side-string pitch 6.5mm, 7-stringed bridge & rock nut. Also was attached a unique 3 single-coiled pick-up.
ESP	Eclipse R-I	The Eclipse R-I was developed based on a concept Sugizo had cherished for a long time. It made its debut on the 2000 Brand New Chaos Act II tour, but more than a year had been spent before the model was finally completed in 2001. Its constitution was of single-coiled pick-up and a Floyd Rose Bridge. Its 42mm thin flattop Adler body with broad-surfaced body design has its quick sound response (a bit different from Eclipse S-I) and also has ability to emphasize wide range sounds.
ESP	Eclipse E-I	The Eclipse E-I made its debut at Sugizo's solo project performance Abstract Day in 1997. It is a semi-acoustic Sugizo model but equipped with Floyd Rose Bridge.
ESP	Eclipse S-I Brilliant -Mixed Media-	The Eclipse S-I Brilliant -Mixed Media-, appeared on July 30, 1996, on the Unending Style tour, as a custom version of Eclipse S-I. Created as a collaboration between the ESP manufacturing staff and Sugizo. This model was equipped with vintage Lase Blue of Lasesensor for the rear pick-up which was modeled exactly by Sugizo himself. In 1997, after the tour, it was sold as a signature model with a limited number produced.
ESP	Eclipse S-I Python	The Eclipse S-I Python made its debut on December 23, 1998, at the Tokyo Dome on the Shining Brightly tour. This model was used for both Asian tours and the 2000 Brand New Chaos tour. In 2000, its sales were limited to 40 because of difficulty to get the real leather of Diamond Pison, but the number of products was increased up to 120.
ESP	Eclipse S-III Brilliant -Mixed Media-	The Eclipse S-III Brilliant -Mixed Media-, as of September 1999, it was put on the market with a limited production of 100. But because of its popularity, two months later 50 more were announced. When it went on the market, Seymour Duncan SJAG-1 carried on the pick-up.
ESP	Eclipse S-III Custom -Fretless-	For the Eclipse S-III Custom -Fretless-, Sugizo originated the idea that fit sustainers to the fretless guitars, and often uses it for his recordings. Its basic components are the same as the S-III. Black-binding is used, which is rare for Eclipse series.
ESP	PR - Triple Neck	The three necks are (each from high to low) 12-stringed guitar, sustainer attached fretless guitar and the Floyd Rose 6-stringed fretted guitar. The pick-ups on each three necks are set to instantaneously change. Presently, the standard models are the same as S-I with Seymour Duncan Antiquity Strat Custom Bridge. Sugizo performed with this triple neck guitar for Luna Sea's openings from 1995's Mother of Love tour, up to the last stage of Epilogue 2000, with the songs "Loveless" and "Genesis of Mind ~Yume no Kanata e~".
ESP	PR - Double Neck	The combination of a 6-string and a fretless guitar started only with Sugizo. Its pick-ups are EMG-SA for the fretless, and Seymour Duncan Antiquity Strat Custom Bridge for the fretted. The bridges are a combination of Tune-matic-bridge (black nickel coating) and Stop-tailpiece. The first time it was used was for song "4:00 AM" on Luna Sea's 2000 Brand New Chaos tour.
Seymour Duncan	DG-300R CTM	Sugizo used a Jaguar-type black guitar (made by Seymour Duncan) for Luna Sea's 2000 Brand New Chaos tour. It was a developed type of a Jaguar with new tensions & sustains. The secret to its success was in the scale change from short to medium. Its bridge was equipped with ST's synchronized tremolo.
Seymour Duncan	DS-280M-RV	Built for right-handers from a left-hand body and neck, which Sugizo pursued as newer possibilities than the Stratocaster. Results are both mellower tones in higher-tone strings and tighter low tones in lower-tone strings. He started using this model on Luna Sea's Brand New Chaos tour, at the live in Yokohama Arena on July 15, 2000. It is known to be responsible for the reversible-strato-tones in "Virgin Mary".
ESP	Edwards & GrassRoots	List of five Edwards guitars, and four GrassRoots guitars Sugizo used on lives respectively.
ESP	(Electric Violin) Kranz EV-75	The violin Sugizo plays on his performances.

== Concerts and tours ==
- 1997: Abstract Day
- 2001: Sugizo & The Spank Your Juice Abstract Day 2001
- 2008–09: Rise to Cosmic Dance
  - Support band: Origa on vocals, Takumi Samejima on guitar, Fire on bass, Greg Ellis on drums, d-kiku on keyboards and programming, K-Ta and Kenji Yoshiura on percussion, Shinpei Ruike on trumpet.
- 2009–10: Next Phase of Cosmic Dance
- 2011: Stairway to the Flower of Life
  - Support band: Origa on vocals, Takumi Samejima on guitar, Tokie on bass, Motokatsu Miyagami on drums, d-kiku on keyboards and programming, Kenji Yoshiura on percussion, Shinpei Ruike on trumpet.

== Discography ==
=== Studio albums ===
- Truth? (November 19, 1997), Oricon Peak Position: #12
- C:Lear (October 1, 2003) #56
- Flower of Life (December 14, 2011) #62
- Tree of Life (December 14, 2011) #69
- Oto (音; December 23, 2016) #132
- Oneness M (November 29, 2017) #23
- Love & Tranquility (愛と調和, Ai to Chōwa; December 23, 2020) #87
- The Voyage to The Higher Self (February 16, 2022) #125
  - Sugizo x Hataken

== Bibliography ==
- A Prayer I (June 26, 1997)
- A Prayer II (July 8, 1997)
- Can I Fly? (February 13, 1998)
- Piano Solo Instruments ~Truth? Sugizo~ (June 30, 1998)
- Ecton x Sugizo Rise to Heaven on Earth (March 25, 2009)
- The Man Who Loved Music - A Life of Ups and Downs (音楽に愛された男、その波乱の半生; March 22, 2011)

== Filmography ==
Year	Title	Role	Notes
2002	Soundtrack	Sion	movie score composer
2002	Hogi-Lala (ホ・ギ・ラ・ラ)	Toshi (トシ)	
2002	Rock'n'roll Mishin (ロックンロールミシン)		
2002	RedЯum		Fuji TV
2016	Tokyo Decibels	Kurosawa	music director
2016	We Are X	himself	X Japan documentary
