= Luv (album) =

2017 studio album by Luna Sea

Studio album by Luna Sea
- Released: December 20, 2017
- Studios: Sound Dali; Sound Crew; Tago Studio Takasaki; Kamome; King Sekiguchidai & YK; Art Terror
- Genres: Alternative rock; progressive rock
- Length: 60:45
- Label: Universal
- Producer: Luna Sea

Luna Sea chronology
A Will (2013)	Luv (2017)	Cross (2019)

Singles from Luv
- 1. "Limit" Released: June 22, 2016

Luv is the ninth studio album by Japanese rock band Luna Sea, released on December 20, 2017. The album reached number 4 on both the Oricon Albums Chart and Billboard Japan.

== Overview ==
At their May 5, 2017 concert at the Nippon Budokan, Luna Sea announced that a then untitled new album would be released within the year. Ryuichi also said that the theme of the album is "Love." The album cover was designed by graphic artist YOSHIROTTEN. The album's eighteen-date The Luv -World Left Behind- tour was set to begin with two concerts on January 27 and 28, 2018 at Mori no Hall 21 in Chiba, but these shows were rescheduled to May 23 and 24 due to Sugizo having the flu. Instead the tour began on February 3.

The opening track "Hold You Down" was originally composed by Inoran, who compared it to "Absorb" from A Will. Maki Ohguro provides backing vocals on "Chikaibumi", "The Luv" and "Black and Blue".

"Piece of a Broken Heart" and "So Sad" were originally composed by Ryuichi with arrangements by Sugizo. Ryuichi and Inoran's Tourbillon bandmate Hiroaki Hayama provides piano on "Piece of a Broken Heart" and "The Luv".

"Ride the Beat, Ride the Dream" is Luna Sea's first instrumental track, originally composed by Inoran. "Black and Blue" was temporarily titled "Persian Cat" (ペルシャ猫, Perusha Neko) after the film No One Knows About Persian Cats which greatly inspired Sugizo.

The song "Limit" was released as a single over a year before Luv. A music video was also made for the opening track "Hold You Down" directed by Shuichi Tan, who last worked with the group on the video for 2000's "Love Song".

== Release ==
Three limited editions of Luv were released. The normal limited edition came with a DVD of the music videos for "Limit" and "Hold You Down". An edition limited to members of the band's fan club, Slave, came with a live album of their May 29, 2017 concert and a DVD or Blu-ray of their September 24, 2016 concert in addition to a photobook and other goods. The third was only sold at their December 23 and 24, 2017 concerts at the Saitama Super Arena and included a live album recorded at that same venue the previous year on December 23 and 24, 2016.

Luv and the band's seven other major label studio albums released at the time were released on vinyl record for the first time on May 29, 2019.

== Track listing ==
All tracks are written by Luna Sea.

No.	Title	Length
1.	"Hold You Down" (Originally composed by Inoran.)	4:21
2.	"Brand New Days" (Originally composed by J.)	3:41
3.	"Chikaibumi (誓い文)" (Originally composed by Sugizo.)	4:55
4.	"Piece of a Broken Heart" (Originally composed by Ryuichi.)	6:27
5.	"The Luv" (Originally composed by Sugizo.)	5:01
6.	"Miss Moonlight" (Originally composed by J.)	4:51
7.	"Yamibi (闇火)" (Originally composed by Sugizo.)	6:10
8.	"Ride the Beat, Ride the Dream" (Originally composed by Inoran and Shinya.)	5:32
9.	"Thousand Years" (Originally composed by Inoran.)	4:45
10.	"Limit" (Originally composed by J.)	3:45
11.	"So Sad" (Originally composed by Ryuichi.)	5:01
12.	"Black and Blue" (Originally composed by Sugizo.)	6:16

== Personnel ==
Luna Sea

- Ryuichi – vocals
- Sugizo – guitar, violin
- Inoran – guitar
- J – bass
- Shinya – drums

Other

- Daisuke "d-kiku" Kikuchi – sound effects and programming
- Hiroaki Hayama – acoustic piano and electric piano on "Piece of a Broken Heart" and "The Luv"
- Maki Ohguro – female chorus on "Chikaibumi", "The Luv" and "Black and Blue"
- Yumi Kawamura – female chorus on "Hold You Down", "Yamibi", "Thousand Years" and "Black and Blue"
- U-Key zone – chorus arrangement on "Thousand Years"
- Ikuro Fujiwara – strings arrangement supervisor and conductor on "Yamibi" and "Black and Blue"
- Tsunehiro Shigyou – strings on "Yamibi" and "Black and Blue"
- Mayumi Tabata – strings and chorus copyist on "Chikaibumi", "The Luv", "Yamibi" and "Black and Blue"

Production

- Masayuki Nakahara – recording and mixing engineer
- Junpei Ohno – recording and assistant engineer
- Koniyoung, Masaaki Taya, Shintaro Inoue, Masashi Hashimoto – recording engineers
- Stuart Hawkes – mastering
- Yoshirotten – art direction and design
- Shinya Hanafusa – design
