= Promise (Luna Sea song) =

Song by Luna Sea
- Released: April 9, 2011
- Genre: Alternative rock
- Length: 3:57
- Label: Luna Sea Inc.
- Songwriter(s): Luna Sea
- Producer(s): Luna Sea

Luna Sea song chronology
"Love Song" (2000)	"Promise" (2011)	"The One -Crash to Create-" (2012)

"Promise" is a song by Japanese rock band Luna Sea, released on April 9, 2011 as a digital download available exclusively on Amazon websites; Japan, United States, United Kingdom, France and Germany. It is the band's first release of completely new material since "Love Song", released over ten years earlier.

== Overview ==
"Promise" was originally composed by Inoran and was first played by Luna Sea at the World Memorial Hall on December 30, 2010 as part of their 20th Anniversary World Tour Reboot -to the New Moon- reunion tour. At the time it was reported to be titled "Promised Night".

Originally there were no plans to release the song, however after the 2011 Tōhoku earthquake and tsunami the band decided the best way they could help contribute to the recovery was to "generate support through music because music is the reason of our presence and our lifetime mission.", and donated all proceeds to the Japanese Red Cross and American Red Cross for earthquake relief and recovery.

== Track listing ==
Written and composed by Luna Sea.

1. "Promise" - 3:57
