= The End of the Dream/Rouge =

- Cover of the regular edition

Single by Luna Sea

from the album A Will
- Released: December 12, 2012
- Genre: Alternative rock
- Length: 8:30
- Label: Universal
- Songwriter: Luna Sea
- Producer: Luna Sea

Luna Sea singles chronology
"The One -Crash to Create-" (2011)	"The End of the Dream/Rouge" (2012)	"Thoughts" (2013)

Music video
- "The End of the Dream" on YouTube "Rouge" on YouTube

"The End of the Dream/Rouge" is the sixteenth single by Japanese rock band Luna Sea, released on December 12, 2012. It is the band's first double A-side single and their first after returning to Universal Music Group. It reached the number 6 position on the Oricon chart, number 7 on Billboard's Japan Hot 100, and also ranked number 6 on Count Down TV.

== Overview ==
"Rouge" was originally written by Sugizo. Shinya said that J asked to play around with the rhythm and changed it. The song was used in a commercial for Goodyear Eagle LS EXE tires.

Both songs were first performed on their The End of the Dream Zepp Tour 2012. Music videos were created for both songs, their first since "Love Song" twelve years ago. The video for "Rouge" is unique in that it was filmed entirely on an iPad.

The single was released in four editions, each with a different cover; a regular, a limited edition with a DVD of the video for "The End of the Dream", a limited edition with a DVD of the video for "Rouge" (listed as "Rouge/The End of the Dream") and a limited edition with two SHM-CDs, each containing one of the tracks, and a blu-ray with both videos.

== Track listing ==
All songs written and composed by Luna Sea.

1. "The End of the Dream" - 4:00
  Originally composed by J.
2. "Rouge" - 4:30
  Originally composed by Sugizo.
