= Thoughts (song) =

- Cover of the regular edition.

Single by Luna Sea

from the album A Will
- B-side: "Lost World"
- Released: August 28, 2013
- Genre: Alternative rock
- Length: 9:49
- Label: Universal
- Songwriter(s): Luna Sea
- Producer(s): Luna Sea

Luna Sea singles chronology
"The End of the Dream/Rouge" (2012)	"Thoughts" (2013)	"Ran" (2013)

Music video
- "Thoughts" on YouTube

"Thoughts" is the seventeenth single by Japanese rock band Luna Sea, released on August 28, 2013. It reached number 7 on the Oricon chart and number 14 on Billboard's Japan Hot 100.

== Overview ==
The B-side "Lost World" is one of the few Luna Sea songs originally composed by Ryuichi. Inoran said that Sugizo helped arrange it and thus added his own "essence" into it.

The single was released in three editions; a regular CD single, and two limited editions both with the music video for "Thoughts", but one version with it on Blu-ray, the other on DVD. All three have different cover art.

"Thoughts" was used in a commercial for the mobile game Master of Chaos, while "Lost World" was used in one for the game Space Fighter.

== Track listing ==
All songs written and composed by Luna Sea.

1. "Thoughts" - 4:04
  Originally composed by Inoran.
2. "Lost World" - 5:45
  Originally composed by Ryuichi.
