= 20th Anniversary World Tour Reboot =

2010 concert tour by Luna Sea

- Reunion tour by Luna Sea
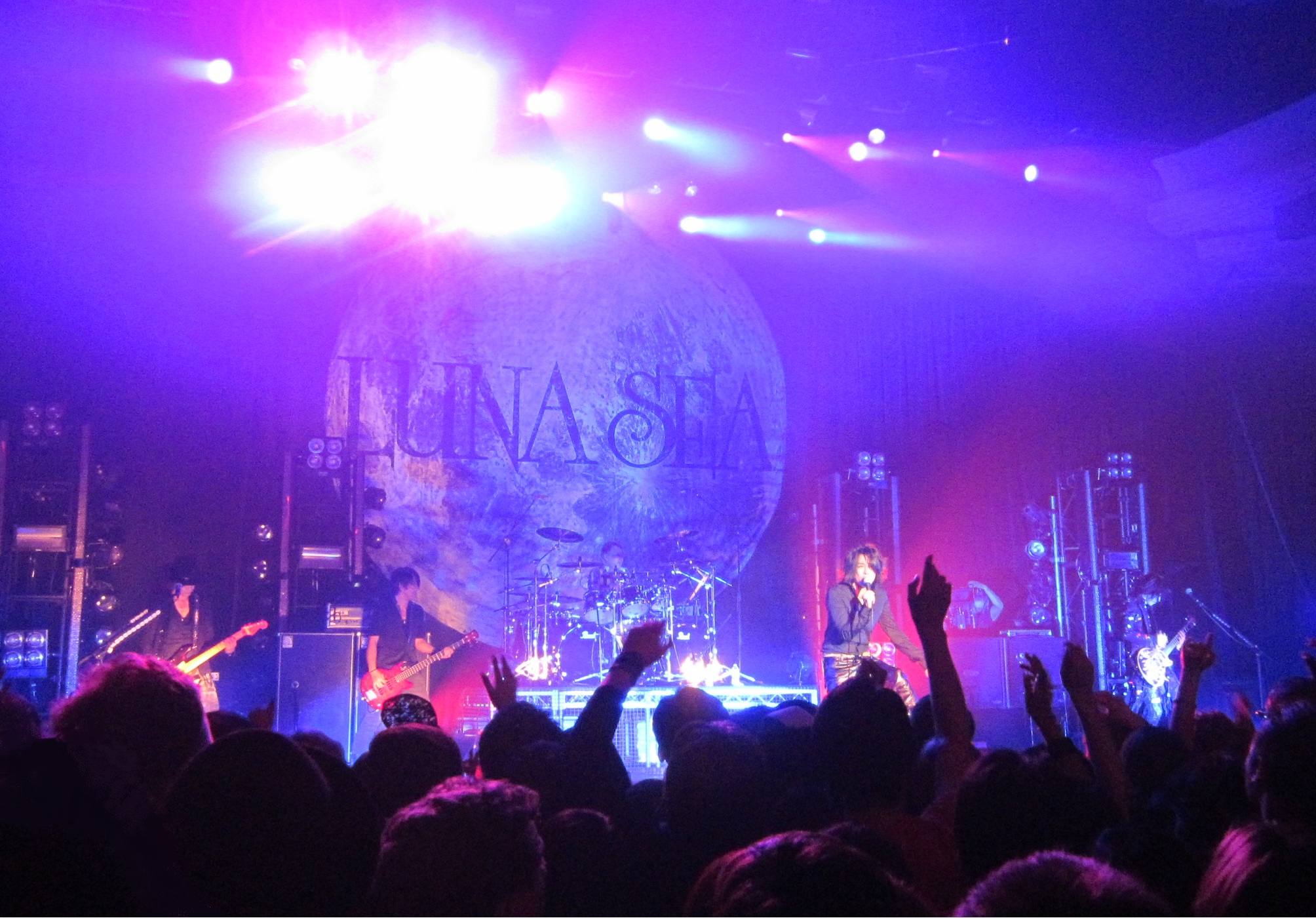
- Luna Sea at the Hollywood Palladium
- Location: Europe, North America, Asia
- Start date: November 27, 2010
- End date: December 31, 2010
- Legs: 1
- No. of shows: 9

Luna Sea concert chronology
- The Brand New Chaos (2000); 20th Anniversary World Tour Reboot (2010)

20th Anniversary World Tour Reboot is a concert tour by Japanese rock band Luna Sea. The tour is the first set of regular concerts given by the band in ten years since their Final Act concerts in December 2000, a one-night reunion concert in 2007 and a performance at the hide memorial summit in 2008.

The tour kicked off on November 27, 2010, in Bochum, Germany, and ended on December 31 in Kobe, Japan. The tour also included a free concert under the band's original name, Lunacy, on Christmas night.

== Overview ==
After their God Bless You ~One Night Dejavu~ concert on December 24, 2007 at the Tokyo Dome and their performance at the hide memorial summit on May 4, 2008, Luna Sea started teasing a possible reunion for 2010. In May 2010 the band's official website was updated, and a series of YouTube videos were being uploaded hinting at the reunion. The last video was uploaded in late July, revealing an important announcement for August 25, when a press conference was announced. On August 31, the band held a press conference in Hong Kong, which was streamed worldwide on Ustream.tv, confirming the reunion and their world tour schedule. It was also stated that new songs might be performed during the tour. Two new songs titled "Days of Repetition" and "Maria" were performed during the December 23 and 24 Tokyo Dome concerts, both recorded later in their next studio album A Will. "Promised Night", now known as "Promise", was performed at the World Memorial Hall on December 30.

On November 30, it was announced that Luna Sea would hold a free concert, titled Lunacy Kurofuku Gentei Gig ~the Holy Night~, at the Tokyo Dome on December 25, under their original name Lunacy. There was a dress code of black clothing, reminiscent of a trend the band started back in their indie days, and all songs performed were pre-1995. The concert was broadcast live in 22 theaters around Japan.

On December 9, a two-day concert at the World Memorial Hall in Kobe for December 30 and 31 was announced, the later being a New Year "countdown" concert.

The entire tour was documented and released on home video, as were the December 24 and 25 concerts at the Tokyo Dome, on March 30, 2011. Their December 4 concert in Los Angeles was filmed in 3D, and was released as a live album and video. Titled Luna Sea 3D in Los Angeles, the album was released on June 1, while the video was premiered on May 29 at Toho Cinemas Roppongi Hills and began showing in theaters nationwide on June 4. The film was later released on DVD, Blu-ray and 3D Blu-ray on February 22, 2012.

== Tour dates ==
Date	City	Country	Venue	Attendance
Europe
November 27, 2010	Bochum	Germany	RuhrCongress	
North America
December 4, 2010	Los Angeles	United States	Hollywood Palladium	
Asia
December 11, 2010	Hong Kong	Hong Kong	AsiaWorld–Expo	
December 18, 2010	Taipei	Taiwan	Taiwan World Trade Center	6,000
December 23, 2010	Tokyo	Japan	Tokyo Dome	45,000
December 24, 2010	Tokyo	Japan	Tokyo Dome	45,000
December 25, 2010	Tokyo	Japan	Tokyo Dome	50,000
December 30, 2010	Kobe	Japan	World Memorial Hall	8,000
December 31, 2010	Kobe	Japan	World Memorial Hall	8,000

== Setlists ==
RuhrCongress/Hollywood Palladium/Asia World Expo/Taiwan World Trade Center

Main set:

1. "Loveless"
2. "Dejavu"
  - "Slave"
  - "G."
3. "End of Sorrow"
4. "True Blue"
5. "Face to Face"
6. "Gravity"
7. "Ra-Se-N"
8. "Providence"
9. "Genesis of Mind ~Yume no Kanata e~"
10. "Drum Solo"
11. "Bass Solo"
12. "Fate"
13. "Storm"
14. "Desire"
15. "Time is Dead"
16. "Rosier"
17. "Tonight"

Encore:

1. "I for You"
  - "Precious..."
  - "In My Dream (With Shiver)"
  - "Believe
  - "Shine"
2. "Wish"

Tokyo Dome (December 23, 2010)

Main set:

1. "Loveless"
2. "Precious..."
3. "G."
4. "Slave"
5. "True Blue"
6. "Sweetest Coma Again"
7. "Luv U"
8. "Gravity"
9. "Until The Day I Die"
10. "Virgin Mary"
11. "Drum Solo"
12. "Bass Solo"
13. "Be Awake"
14. "Breathe"
15. "Storm"
16. "Desire"
17. "Time is Dead"
18. "Rosier"
19. "Tonight"

Encore:

1. "I for You"
2. "Days of Repetition" (New song)
3. "Dejavu"

2nd Encore:

1. "In My Dream (With Shiver)"
2. "Wish"

3rd Encore:

1. "Forever & Ever"

Tokyo Dome (December 24, 2010)

Main set:

1. "Time Has Come"
2. "Dejavu"
3. "Jesus"
4. "End of Sorrow"
5. "Shine"
6. "Face to Face"
7. "Gravity"
8. "Rain"
9. "Providence"
10. "Genesis of Mind ~Yume no Kanata e~"
11. "Drum Solo"
12. "Bass Solo"
13. "In Future"
14. "I for You"
15. "Storm"
16. "Desire"
17. "Time is Dead"
18. "Rosier"
19. "Tonight"

Encore:

1. "In Silence"
2. "Maria" (New song)
3. "Believe"

2nd Encore:

1. "Love Song"
2. "Precious..."
3. "Wish"

Tokyo Dome (December 25, 2010)

Main set:

1. "Fate"
2. "Dejavu"
3. "Mechanical Dance"
4. "Imitation"
5. "Image"
6. "Slave"
7. "Branch Road"
8. "Sandy Time"
9. "Symptom"
10. "Suspicious"
11. "Search for Reason"
12. "Drum Solo"
13. "Bass Solo"
14. "Blue Transparency Kagirinaku Tōmei ni Chikai Burū"
15. "Shade"
16. "Chess"
17. "Time is Dead"
18. "Precious..."
19. "Nightmare"

Encore:

1. "Rosier"

2nd Encore:

1. "Mother"

World Memorial Hall (December 30, 2010)

Main set:

1. "Time Has Come"
2. "Dejavu"
3. "End of Sorrow"
4. "Shine"
5. "Face to Face"
6. "Gravity"
7. "Rain"
8. "Providence"
9. "Genesis of Mind ~Yume no Kanata e~
10. "Drum Solo"
11. "Bass Solo"
12. "Fate"
13. "Storm"
14. "Desire"
15. "Time is Dead"
16. "Rosier"
17. "Tonight"

Encore:

1. "I for You"
2. "Promised Night" (New Song)
3. "Precious..."
4. "Wish"

2nd Encore:

1. "In My Dream (With Shiver)"

World Memorial Hall (December 31, 2010)

Main set:

1. "Up to You"
2. "Dejavu"
3. "G."
4. "Slave"
5. "True Blue"
6. "Sweetest Coma Again"
7. "Gravity"
8. "Until the Day I Die"
9. "Virgin Mary"
10. "Drum Solo"
11. "Bass Solo"
12. "Fate"
13. "Desire"
14. "Time is Dead"
15. "Rosier"
16. "Tonight"

New Year's Countdown

1. "Wish"
2. "Precious..."
3. "In My Dream (With Shiver)"

Encore:

1. "Believe"
2. "I for You"
3. "Loveless"

== Personnel ==
- Ryuichi – vocals
- Sugizo – lead guitar, violin, backing vocals
- Inoran – rhythm guitar, backing vocals
- J – bass, backing vocals
- Shinya (真矢) – drums
