= The One: Crash to Create =

"The One -Crash to Create-"
- Cover of the regular edition

Single by Luna Sea
- Released: March 21, 2012
- Studio: Victor, Sound Dali, Kamome, Art Terror, Alive
- Genre: Progressive rock
- Length: 22:56
- Label: HPQ
- Songwriter: Luna Sea
- Producer: Luna Sea

Luna Sea singles chronology
"Love Song" (2000)	"The One -Crash to Create-" (2012)	"The End of the Dream/Rouge" (2012)

"The One -Crash to Create-" is the fifteenth single by the Japanese rock band Luna Sea, released on March 21, 2012. It is their first single since reuniting in 2010 and their first since "Love Song", which was released over 11 years earlier. It debuted at number five on the Oricon Singles Chart and reached number 23 on Billboard Japan's Japan Hot 100.

== Overview ==
J said he felt that the first new material Luna Sea released after reuniting had to be good, no matter how long it took to create. He initially wanted a song that would bring out all of the things they had done up to their disbandment, as well as all the stuff they had done individually after it, but realized this would be impossible to fit into a normal format. So the bassist came up with the idea for each member to create their own parts, and then they would connect them together. He and drummer Shinya discussed the arrangement right up until five minutes before recording, and as a result said they both largely recorded their parts in one take. The final result is a song lastly nearly 23 minutes.

Sugizo believes that it was because they were able to complete the challenging and "grand" "The One - Crash to Create", that Luna Sea was able to create its follow-up and "unquestionable rock 'n roll" songs "The End of the Dream" and "Rouge". He also said that the track had a big influence on the band's first album in 13 years, A Will.

On March 8, 2012, the band held an event titled Full Moon Contact "The One" at United Cinemas Toyosu, where they played the recording of the song for an audience of 30 people. It was streamed live worldwide on Nico Nico Live and Ustream. The song was then released exclusively on Luna Sea Mobile on March 14, before its general release on March 21, 2012. The single was released in four editions, each with different cover art; a normal CD, a HQCD, a Hybrid SACD, and a set including all three and a DVD with the track in 5.1 surround sound. The first actual live performance of the song was for the special pay-per-view program Luna Sea TV Special -The End of the Dream-, which was broadcast on WOWOW on July 8, 2012, when the band performed without an audience.

The song was included on the band's 2014 compilation album 25th Anniversary Ultimate Best -The One-, while a live performance of it is featured on Never Sold Out 2, which was released on the same day.

== Reception ==
"The One -Crash to Create-" debuted at number five on the Oricon Singles Chart, selling close to 24,000 copies in its first week, and charted for seven weeks. It reached number 23 on Billboard Japan's Japan Hot 100.

== Track listing ==
Written and composed by Luna Sea.

1. "The One -Crash to Create-" - 22:56
  Composed by J, Sugizo and Inoran. Written mainly by Ryuichi.

== Personnel ==
Luna Sea

- Ryuichi – vocals
- Sugizo – guitar, violin
- Inoran – guitar
- J – bass
- Shinya – drums

Additional musicians

- Daisuke "d-kiku" Kikuchi – keyboards, sound effects, programming
- H. Hayama – piano
- Tomoyuki Asakawa – harp
- Yucca – backing vocals
- Chiyoko Noguchi – strings
- Ikuro Fujiwara – strings arrangement supervisor and conductor
- Mayumi Tabata – strings copyist

Technical personnel

- Hitoshi Hiruma – recording engineer, mixing engineer
- Akinori Kaizaki – recording engineer
- Masaaki Taya – recording engineer
- Stuart Hawks – mastering engineer
