= Aion (band) =

Japanese metal band

- Origin: Osaka, Japan
- Genres: Heavy metal; thrash metal; power metal; speed metal
- Years active: 1983–1985, 1986–present
- Labels: MAR 1987; Night Gallery 1989–1990; BMG-Victor 1991–1995; Deathrash Bound 1997–present
- Members: Izumi

Aion is a Japanese heavy metal band from Osaka, formed in 1983 by guitarist Izumi. Aion are considered to be important to the formation of visual kei, credited as being one of the bands to start the movement in the early 1980s. They were also one of the most successful Japanese metal bands of the early 1990s, charting on the Oricon music chart and touring with big bands such as Luna Sea. As of 2010 they have released 15 full albums, 6 singles, 2 EPs and more than 10 VHS/DVD. Following the April 2017 departures of longtime bassist Dean and vocalist Nov, Izumi continues Aion as the only official member.

== History ==
Aion was originally created in 1983 by Izumi Ochiai. He soon ended it in 1985 to start a new band named Mein Kampf (which included future X guitarist Kerry and Color drummer Toshi). But this band was short lived as well, only lasting until May 1986. Izumi then decided to try again with Aion, bringing with him Mein Kampf bassist Tatsuya "Dean" Miwa and vocalist Kenichi "Rod" Fujisaki, and adding Jun "S.A.B" Saburi on drums. Rod would soon be replaced by Salee, whom after a year, would then be replaced by Satoru Sasano. And with this line-up they had their first official release, the 1987 single "Hang on Night", which sold out all 3,000 copies. In 1988, Satoru left and Hisayoshi Hiraga joined. Their first album, Deathrash Bound, was released in 1989, and sold out all 5,000 copies. Hisayoshi left soon after the album's release, and they finally got a steady vocalist when he was replaced by Nov.

In 1990 they released Human Griefman, which is basically Deathrash Bound, the only differences being Nov is singing and he also rewrote the lyrics. Signing a contract with BMG in 1990, Aion gained a following in the visual kei scene. 1991 was the year when they started to succeed, with the release of Aionism. At that time, Aion and Luna Sea used to play a lot of shows together. This led to Luna Sea providing some backing vocals on the album. Bigger success would come in 1992 when they changed from their thrash and speed metal roots to a more power metal sound. The first album with the new sound, Aion -Aion-, was very successful. Also in 1992 S.A.B left and was replaced by Shu. Local magazines and TV showcased them from 1991 until 1995, when their album Freak-Out was released. In 1995 they disbanded, although not in the traditional sense as Nov and Izumi continued to release their own music using the Aion name and reverting to their original thrash and speed metal sound.

In 2000 Dean and Shu rejoined the band and they released the album Magnitude in three versions: Japanese, English and All English. Although Shu soon left, he was replaced with the return of S.A.B, thus the "classic" Aion line-up was reunited. In 2003 they released the album Sister. They continued to play shows in small live houses, until 2009 when S.A.B left. Support drummer Youth-K was recruited in his place, and in 2010 Aion released their first single in 16 years "Black Heart". Aion took part in Luna Sea's Lunatic Fest at Makuhari Messe on June 28, 2015. Bassist Dean and vocalist Nov, who were in the band for the last 17 and 28 years respectively, both left Aion on April 18, 2017, leaving Izumi as the only official member.

== Band members ==
=== Current members ===
- Izumi Ochiai – guitar 1983–1985, 1986–present (Mein Kampf, The Braincase), vocals, bass, drums 2017–present

=== Former members ===
- Taro – vocals 1983
- Potukun – vocals
- Shin'ichi "Shin" – drums
- Hideki – drums 1983–1985
- Ray – bass 1984–1985
- Kamizi – vocals 1985
- Kenichi "Rod" Fujisaki – vocals 1986 (Mein Kampf, Justy Nasty, Craze)
- Salee – vocals 1986–1987
- Satoru Sasano – vocals 1987–1989 (Paranoia, Sweet Death)
- Hisayoshi Hiraga – vocals 1989 (Rosenfeld, Thread Worm)
- Shue "Shu" Sakai – drums 1992–1995, 2000 (Virus, Girl Tique)
- Jun "S.A.B" Saburi – drums 1986–1992, 2000–2009 (Virus, Lizer) Died October 2, 2016.
- Nov Takafumi – vocals 1989–2017 (Paranoia, Z-Sect, Volcano, Zigoku Quartet)
- Tatsuya "Dean" Miwa – bass 1986–1995, 2000–2017 (Mein Kampf)

== Discography ==
=== Studio albums ===
- Deathrash Bound (March 21, 1989)
- Human Griefman (February 25, 1990)
- Aionism (October 8, 1991) Oricon Albums Chart Position: No. 37
- Aion -Aion- (愛音～AION～; August 21, 1992) No. 34
- Z (Z [ZETTO], June 2, 1993) No. 40
- Absolute (March 2, 1994) No. 41
- Freak-Out (November 22, 1995) No. 96
- Mithras (February 22, 1997, fan-club only)
- Eve (April 4, 1998, fan-club only)
- Ceremony of Cross Out (September 9, 1999, fan-club only)
- Judge of Death Line (September 9, 1999, fan-club only)
- Manners of Kill and Wound (September 9, 1999, fan-club only)
- Magnitude (December 24, 2000, fan-club only, 3 versions: Japanese, English and English with Japanese)
- Sister (October 24, 2003, fan-club only)

=== EPs ===
- MA-G-MA (November 25, 1990)
- Sei・Aion (聖・愛音; December 16, 1992) No. 77

=== Self-cover album ===
- Nine Bells (July 7, 2012)

=== Live albums ===
- Plasmatic Mania (April 8, 1992) No. 46
- Threatened Species Mania (December 13, 2011)

=== Singles ===
- "Hang on Night" (July 1987)
- "Fatalism" (August 3, 1990, distributed at a Nakano Kokaido concert)
- "Gasp for Breath" (August 5, 1990, released with the music magazine Rockin' f)
- "Be Afraid" (October 2, 1991) Oricon Singles Chart Position: No. 45
- "Piece of My Life" (1991, limited to 3,000 who purchased "Be Afraid" and Aionism)
- "Aion -Aion-" (愛音～AION～; August 5, 1992) No. 68
- "Missing" (February 23, 1994)
- "Black Heart" (October 13, 2010)
