= Luna Sea =

Japanese rock band

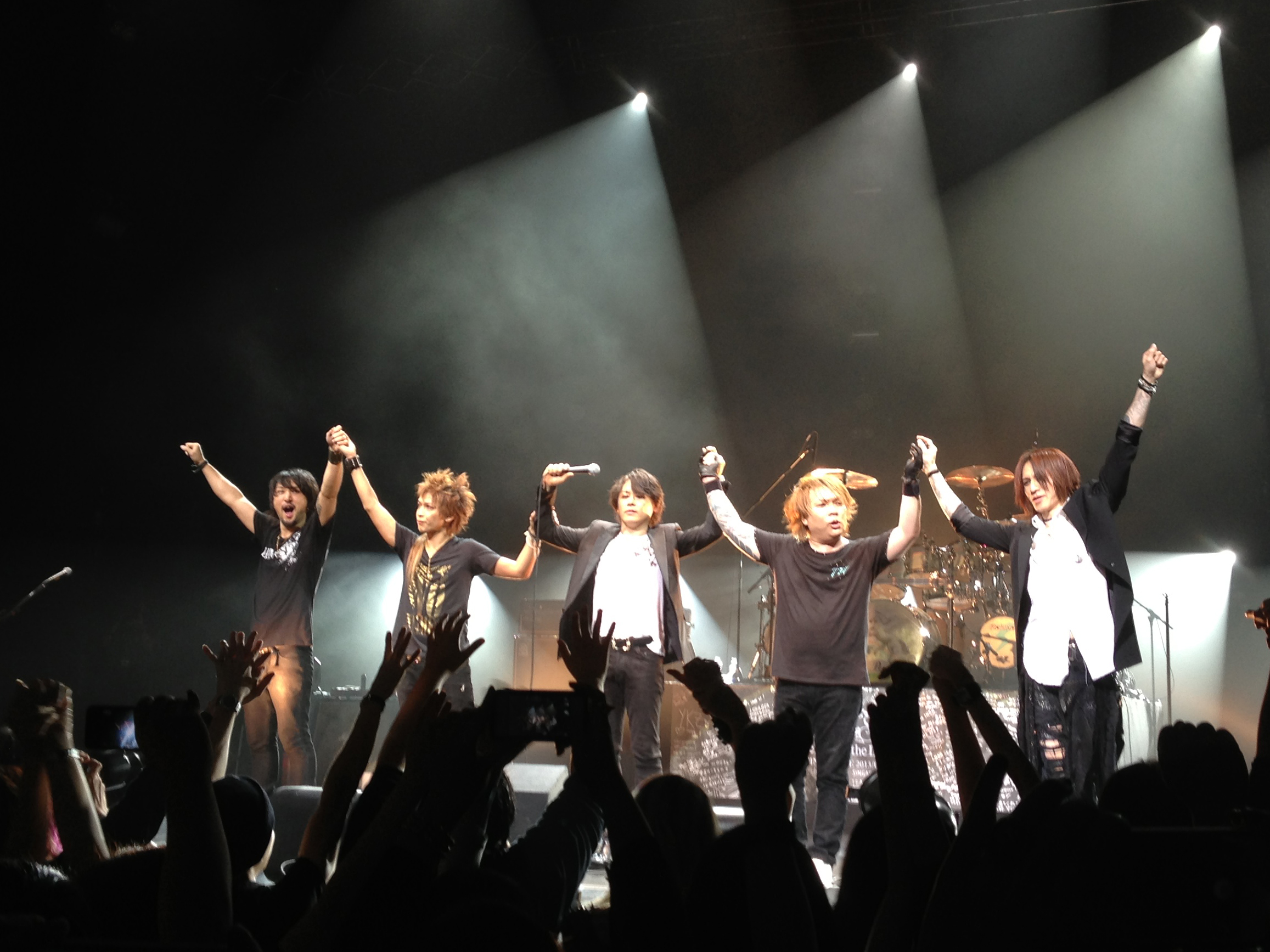
- Luna Sea in 2013. From left to right: J, Inoran, Ryuichi, Shinya, Sugizo.

Background information
- Also known as: Lunacy
- Origin: Kanagawa, Japan
- Genres: Alternative rock; punk rock; progressive rock; hard rock
- Works: Discography
- Years active: 1986–2000, 2010–present (Reunions: 2007, 2008)
- Labels: Extasy; MCA Victor; Universal; HPQ; Avex Trax
- Members: J; Inoran; Sugizo; Ryuichi
- Past members: Yasu; Shinya
- Website: www.lunasea.jp

Luna Sea (stylized as LUNA SEA) is a Japanese rock band formed in Kanagawa Prefecture in 1986. Due to the use of makeup and costumes early in their career and their widespread popularity, they are considered one of the most successful and influential bands in the visual kei movement. Throughout the mid-1990s they used significantly less makeup, and after a one-year break in 1997, came back with a more mainstream alternative rock style and toned down their on-stage attire. They disbanded in 2000. In 2003, HMV ranked Luna Sea at number 90 on their list of the 100 most important Japanese pop acts.

Initially founded in 1986, by bassist J and rhythm guitarist Inoran while in high school, the band was originally called Lunacy. In 1989 they recruited lead guitarist Sugizo, drummer Shinya and vocalist Ryuichi, a lineup that remained the same until Shinya's death in February 2026. They released a few demo tapes prior to renaming themselves Luna Sea and releasing their self-titled debut album in 1991. The band achieved their breakthrough success with a sold-out tour in 1991, which helped them get a contract with MCA Victor, and with the release of their second album Image (1992), which reached number nine on the Oricon music chart. Following the critically acclaimed albums Eden (1993), Mother (1994) and Style (1996), the band switched to Universal in 1998 and released their best-selling studio album, Shine. In late 2000, after their seventh studio album Lunacy, Luna Sea disbanded.

Luna Sea reunited for a one-off reunion concert in 2007 at the Tokyo Dome, and again in 2008 for the Hide memorial summit. In 2010 the group officially reunited and held a world tour. Three years later they released their first new album in thirteen years, A Will. Their ninth album, Luv, followed four years later in 2017. At the end of 2019, their tenth album Cross, co-produced by Steve Lillywhite, became their first to top Billboard Japan.

== History ==
=== 1986–1991: Formation and debut album ===
The band's logotype, used since 1991

Childhood friends Jun "J" Onose and Kiyonobu "Inoran" Inoue founded a band called Lunacy in high school in 1986. The name was chosen because they felt something akin to "madness" in their sound, the future they aspired to, and the things they were doing. As the other members left to pursue careers or college, they recruited Pinocchio drummer Shinya Yamada and guitarist Yasuhiro "Sugizo" Sugihara on January 16, 1989. J had originally asked Shinya, but the drummer insisted that his friend Sugizo also join, and the bassist did not object as he found the prospect of a twin guitar setup between Inoran and Sugizo to be intriguing. According to Sugizo, they played a single concert before firing their vocalist for a lack of talent. However, in his autobiography, J recalls that vocalist Yasuhiro "Yasu" Imai, one of his closest friends, suddenly told him one day that he wanted to quit. He speculated that Yasu might have become uncomfortable because, like any band, the members grew at different rates, differences in direction became apparent, and their expectations of each other gradually increased. At the same time, J learned that Ryuichi Kawamura (then called "Rayla") was considering leaving his band Slaughter, and said the timing worked out perfectly for Ryuichi to replace the outgoing Yasu on May 6.

The finalized lineup of Lunacy made their debut on stage at the 100-seat capacity Play House in Machida, Tokyo on May 29, 1989. They released their first demo tape, "Lunacy", on August 9, with all one hundred copies sold out. In October, they transferred their activities to Meguro, where they performed at local venues such as Rock-May-Kan and Live Station. In December, the band's second demo "Shade" was released, with all one thousand copies sold out, and on December 17 the band sold all 150 tickets for their first official one-man live concert at Machida Play House. In 1990, Lunacy continued to play small venues, but held their first concert outside Tokyo in Osaka. They held their first anniversary concert, Kurofuku Gentei Gig (黒服限定GIG; "dress code black gig"), at Machida Play House on June 10, where they distributed the free demo "Lastly". When the band started working towards creating their first album, J suggested Lunacy change their name. He felt that continuing with a name meaning "madness" might eventually trap and confine them, and wanted one that conveyed a deeper and broader meaning. "Luna Sea" suddenly came to him one day, and he proposed writing it in Japanese as "月海", which would evoke a mystical energy reminiscent of the ebb and flow of the tides. Additionally, he liked that there were very few bands that used something found in nature as their name, and the fact that no other band would dare change their name at such an important time as their debut album. The Japanese spelling was ultimately not used, and their first concert with the new name was held at Live Station on November 24.

In early 1991, they were discovered by hide and signed to his X Japan bandmate Yoshiki's independent label, Extasy Records. Luna Sea took part in the label's Nuclear Fusion Tour in March with Gilles de Rais and Sighs of Love Potion. On the tour, a 3-track sample CD including a song from each band was freely distributed, to which they contributed a short sample of "Precious". The self-titled Luna Sea was released on April 21. They held larger live performances throughout the year with their first national tour titled Under the New Moon, which was separated into three legs or "Episodes", with 45 performances, of which the final concerts attracted an audience of over one thousand. The tour gathered seventeen thousand people in total. On October 29, they performed at that year's Extasy Summit concert, at the sold out Nippon Budokan.

=== 1992–1994: Breakthrough success; Major label debut with Image, Eden and Mother ===
In January 1992, the band's official fan club Slave was launched. Its name was derived from "slave tapes", a term used for backup tapes that are synchronized during the recording process, in order to symbolize that the fans "synchronize" with the band. In March they held a small fan club tour and on May 20 performed their last indie concert, the third kurofuku gentei gig at Machida Play House. On May 21, Luna Sea released their first major label studio album, Image, on MCA Victor. They had originally been approached by Akira Sekiguchi of Victor Invitation when it was still not publicly announced that they had signed to Extasy, so when the time came to sign to a major label, they decided to go with Victor, as they were the first to approach them and Sekiguchi had been very enthusiastic. However, negotiations were conducted with someone else, and talks broke down when the band felt the offer was not enough. But they were then told a new Victor label was launching. Because it was new with only one other Japanese artist, Mari Hamada, MCA Victor could provide Luna Sea with the level of support they wanted, agreed to their requests, and even allowed them to have Sekiguchi act as their representative. The album peaked at number 9, spending 14 weeks on the Oricon charts. It was followed by the band's debut tour Image or Real in May, and corresponding with their increasing popularity, continued with After the Image tour in September. There were 25 concerts with an audience of more than twenty-eight thousand people. On October 31, they performed at another Extasy Summit at the Nippon Budokan.

"Rosier"
A 30-second sample of "Rosier", the first single from Mother (1994) and the band's first to receive mainstream success.

"Face to Face"
A 30-second sample of "Face to Face", a heavy rock song originally from Mother. Here is the live recording from December 27, 1994 at the Nippon Budokan, included on the album Never Sold Out.

Luna Sea's first single, "Believe", was released in February. The single peaked at number 11, spending 7 weeks on the charts. The band started working on their second album and began touring throughout the country for it on April 16, with the Search for My Eden tour. The tour included 14 concerts in the same number of locations, and mobilized an audience of around twenty-six thousand people. The album Eden was released on April 21, and peaked at number 5, spending 19 weeks on the charts. It was certified gold, for shipment of over two hundred thousand copies, by the RIAJ. In July they released their second single "In My Dream (With Shiver)", which peaked at number 9 and spent 4 weeks on the charts. In August, the four concert Search for My Eden Encore tour was held, of which the latter two shows on August 26 and 27 were planned for the Nippon Budokan. However, the last concert was postponed until August 30 because of the Category 4 Super Typhoon Yancy. In December the Sin After Sin video compilation was released, which included performances from smaller venues during the year, and the band started the Garden of Sinners 93-94 tour, with 20 concerts that mobilized forty thousand people. At the end of the year, the band received the "Grand Prix New Artist of the Year" award at the 7th Japan Gold Disc Awards.

On February 12, 1994, the band performed the tour's final concert at the sold-out 17,000 seat Yokohama Arena. On July 21, their third single "Rosier" was released. It peaked at number 3, spent 25 weeks on the charts, and was certified gold by the RIAJ. In December, the single's promotional video was awarded the "Best Promotional Video" at the 36th Japan Record Awards. Between August 9 and 30, the band went on a sold-out five-stop tour with Soft Ballet and Buck-Tick titled LSB. It is now looked at as a legendary tour in Japanese rock, not only due to the three headlining acts coming together, but because the then up-and-coming guest acts, The Yellow Monkey, L'Arc-en-Ciel, The Mad Capsule Markets and Die in Cries, all went on to achieve success. On September 21, Luna Sea released their fourth single "True Blue", which topped the charts, and was certified platinum for selling over four hundred thousand copies. Responding to the popularity, the band released their third album Mother on October 26. It peaked at number 2, spent 30 weeks on the charts, and eventually sold more than half a million copies. In December they performed at the Osaka-jō Hall, and three times, of which two were consecutive, at the Nippon Budokan.

=== 1995–1997: First live at the Tokyo Dome, Style, and brief hiatus ===
The members of Luna Sea went to Ireland to film the promotional video for their fifth single, "Mother". Released in February 1995, the single peaked at number 5, spending 8 weeks on the charts, and was certified gold by the RIAJ. Throughout March and May, the band held the Mother of Love, Mother of Hate tour, which included 31 concert in twenty-seven locations and an audience of sixty-three thousand people. On May 24, Luna Sea released their first promotional video collection, Eclipse I. On November 13, the band's sixth single "Desire" was released. It topped the charts, spending 14 weeks on them, and sold more than half a million copies, being certified platinum by the RIAJ. By now, the band's popularity had reached the point to which they would headline Japan's largest indoor concert venue, the Tokyo Dome, on December 23. Titled Lunatic Tokyo, the 50,000 tickets sold out the same day they went on sale, and the show was filmed for a home video release the following year.

In March 1996, "End of Sorrow", their seventh single, topped the charts, spent 8 weeks on them, and was certified platinum by the RIAJ. It was followed on April 22, by the band's fourth album Style. It was the band's first album to top the charts, spending 21 weeks on them, sold more than half a million records by the end of the year, being certified platinum, and was the thirtieth best-selling album of 1996. In July, the single "In Silence" was released and peaked at number 2, spending 9 weeks on the charts, and was certified gold. Also in July, the band went on the sold-out Un Ending Style tour, which opened with two consecutive concerts at Yokohama Arena and continued for 16 concerts in nine locations, and mobilized an audience of over one hundred thousand people. It was continued in October with the Encore - To Rise tour, 28 concerts in smaller venues, and ended with a Christmas concert on December 23, titled Christmas Stadium ~Mafuyu no Yagai~ (Christmas STADIUM 〜真冬の野外〜), at the outdoor Yokohama Stadium. During the concert it was announced that the band would have a temporary year break in 1997 for each member to pursue solo careers. J later explained that some members wanted to start solo activities, while others did not as they felt they should all be focusing on the band, and the resulting conflict is what resulted in the one year limit.

May 1997 saw the release of the Rew home video, which summarizes the band's activities from their formation. During their hiatus that year, Luna Sea switched record companies, as MCA Records was renamed to Universal. The band's first compilation album, Singles, was released on December 17. The album topped the charts, sold over a million copies in the first three weeks, spent 27 weeks on the charts, and would go on to become the twentieth best-selling album of 1998. It was also one of the albums to receive the "Best Rock Album of the Year" award at the 12th Japan Gold Disc Awards. On the same day Singles was released, Luna Sea resumed their activities with a concert at Akasaka Blitz, where they unveiled a toned-down visual image.

=== 1998–2000: Commercial peak; Shine, Lunacy, disbandment ===
"Storm"
A 30-second sample of "Storm", the first single from Shine (1998). It is a fast paced rock song and the band's best-selling single.

"I for You"
A 27-second sample of the slow pop rock ballad "I for You", which was the third single from Shine.

In April 1998, the band's ninth and best-selling single, "Storm", was released. It topped the charts with sales of over three hundred thousand copies, becoming the band's second single to sell more than half a million units, and spent 10 weeks on the charts. It was the twenty-ninth best-selling single of 1998, and was certified platinum by the RIAJ. In June and July, two more singles followed, "Shine", which topped the charts, and "I for You", which peaked at number 2 and spent 16 weeks on the charts. Both singles were certified platinum. "I for You" was the theme song of the very popular Japanese drama Kamisama mō Sukoshi dake. On July 23, Shine, the band's sixth and best-selling studio album, was released. It topped the charts, spent 13 weeks on them, and was certified million. It, like Singles, was awarded "Best Rock Album" at the 13th Japan Gold Disc Awards. The song "Breathe" from this album was also used in the Japanese release of Walt Disney's animated movie Mulan. In August, the band held two consecutive concerts at Yokohama Stadium, titled Revive ~Manatsu no Yagai~ (REVIVE 〜真夏の野外〜), followed in September by, at the time, the band's longest tour, Shining Brightly, which included 33 concerts in twenty-six locations and mobilized one hundred and fifty thousand people. Two consecutive sold out concerts, titled End of Period, were held at the Tokyo Dome on December 23 and 24.

In 1999, Luna Sea's popularity reached overseas to neighboring countries in Asia, and they went on their first Asian tour in January, visiting Taipei, Hong Kong, and Shanghai. In celebration of the 10th anniversary of the band, their first live compilation album Never Sold Out was released in May, which peaked at number 5, and was certified gold. They then planned an open-air concert at Tokyo Big Sight, with a stage costing 10 million dollars US. On May 27, two days before the planned concert, a typhoon destroyed the elaborate set. However, at the suggestion of Sugizo, the debris was used as a backdrop. 10th Anniversary Gig [Never Sold Out] Capacity ∞ was held on May 30, and was attended by 100,000 people, making it one of the largest-ticketed concerts ever held by a single act. On December 23, a sold-out joint live by Luna Sea and Glay, titled The Millennium Eve, was held at the Tokyo Dome.

On January 29, 2000, the band's song "Sweetest Coma Again" was included in the Japanese release of the original soundtrack to, the James Bond film, The World Is Not Enough. Their first release in almost two years, the single "Gravity" was released in March and topped the charts, being certified gold. In June the single "Tonight" was released, peaked at number 4, and was also certified gold. Following the singles, on June 23 the concert titled Premiere of Lunacy 2000 was held at the Nippon Budokan to promote the band's upcoming album. At the show they only played songs from their upcoming seventh studio album. The album, Lunacy, was released on July 12, and while it was not as successful as their previous efforts, spending only 6 weeks on the charts, it peaked at number 3 and was certified gold by the RIAJ. It was supported by two sold out nationwide tours in July and October, titled Brand New Chaos, with 32 concerts in sixteen locations and an extended two shows in Hong Kong and Taipei. The tour garnered 350,000 people. On November 8, they released their fourteenth and last single, "Love Song", which peaked at number 4. That same day the band held an emergency press conference in Hong Kong, where they announced they would "drop the curtain" after two shows at the Tokyo Dome. The decision was made at a meeting held in a hotel suite after the August 2000 Fukuoka performances of the Brand New Chaos tour.

The compilation album Period -the Best Selection-, which topped the charts and was certified platinum by the RIAJ, was released on December 23. On December 26 and 27, Luna Sea performed their two consecutive sold out farewell concerts, The Final Act, at the Tokyo Dome. In March 2001, Billboard quoted music critic Hiromichi Ugaya as saying that Luna Sea broke up due to conflict between Ryuichi and the other members. Speaking of the last years of the band in 2008, Sugizo stated that the relationships and communication between members were strained due to egos. Looking back decades later, J wrote in his 2025 autobiography that ever since they achieved their first Tokyo Dome concert in 1995, the members lacked a goal to strive for in unison, and that he personally started to sense the band was coming to its end when they regrouped and began working on Shine, after a year off in 1997 for solo activities. Although it was never said aloud, he suspects each member went into recording Lunacy with the feeling that it would be their last. In 2014, after the band reunited, Inoran claimed that at the time "we promised to each other that we would all go out into the world while we were in our 30s, absorb things and regroup."

=== 2007–2011: Reunion concerts and World Tour Reboot ===
Nearly seven years after disbanding, Luna Sea reunited for the God Bless You ~One Night Dejavu~ concert on December 24, 2007, at the Tokyo Dome. Tickets for the show sold out within five minutes, and the concert was broadcast live on Japan's NHK BS Hi-vision Satellite channel. A tribute album to the band, Luna Sea Memorial Cover Album -Re:birth-, was previously released on December 19, 2007. It features covers of their songs performed by artists that were either influenced by Luna Sea or artists that the band's members respect, such as Nami Tamaki, Masami Tsuchiya, High and Mighty Color, Mucc, and Merry. Less than a year later, Luna Sea reunited again to perform at the hide memorial summit on May 4, 2008, at Ajinomoto Stadium. On May 29, 2009, the band's music catalog was released on iTunes.

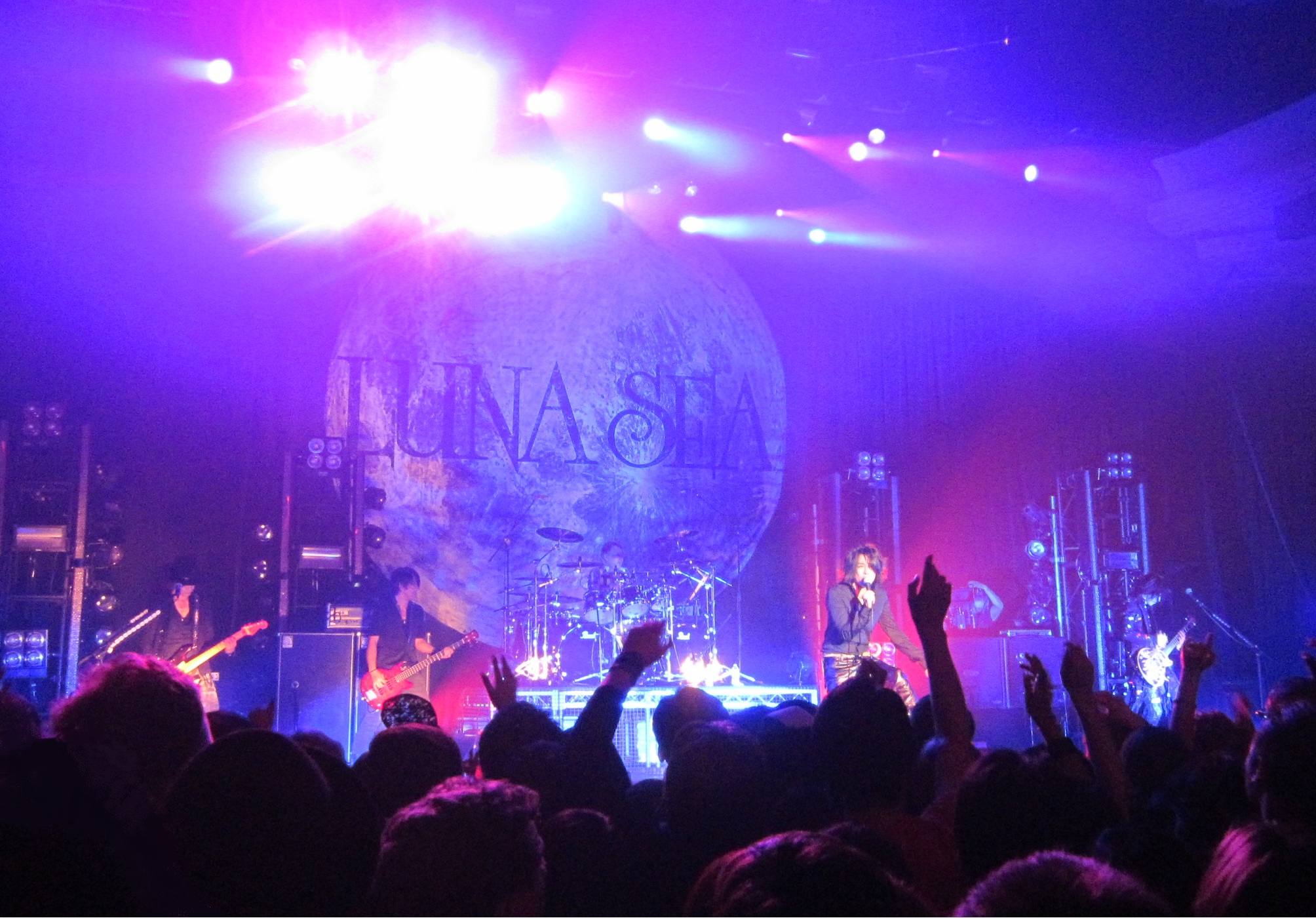
Luna Sea performing at the Hollywood Palladium in 2010. The concert was recorded and released as the theatrical film and live album, Luna Sea 3D in Los Angeles.

On August 25, 2010, it was announced that Luna Sea would hold a press conference on August 31 in Hong Kong, where they previously announced the end of their activities ten years earlier. At the press conference, the band officially announced their reunion. Their first concert tour in ten years, the world tour named 20th Anniversary World Tour Reboot -to the New Moon-, was confirmed and the band also said they were in the process of writing new songs. Inoran later cited the success of their 2007 concert as a major reason for the regrouping. The tour began on November 27 in Germany and continued on to the United States, Hong Kong and Taiwan, and was planned to end with two shows in Japan on the 23 and 24 of December at the Tokyo Dome. A third show, a free concert titled Lunacy Kurofuku Gentei Gig ~the Holy Night~ (LUNACY 黒服限定GIG 〜the Holy Night〜), which referred to the three previous kurofuku gentei gigs held in their indie days, was held on December 15 with all songs performed being from pre-1995. The tour finished with two additional concerts at the World Memorial Hall in Kobe on December 30 and 31. Before the last shows, in December, they transferred record companies to Avex Group's HPQ label.

A new re-recording of their debut album, Luna Sea, was released on March 16, 2011, as a self-cover. In response to the 2011 Tōhoku earthquake and tsunami that occurred on March 11 in Japan, the band released the digital download song "Promise" on April 9. It was their first new song in ten years and was released exclusively on Amazon websites, with all proceeds donated to the Japanese Red Cross to aid the victims. A live album and video of their US concert, both titled Luna Sea 3D in Los Angeles, was released in June, with the film being shown in Japanese theaters nationwide. On October 22, they held a charity concert titled A Promise to the Brave at Saitama Super Arena, and all proceeds from the event went to the Japanese Red Cross. Tickets for the show went on sale on August 14 and sold out in five minutes.

=== 2012–2015: A Will and 25th anniversary ===
The band's first physical single in over eleven years, "The One -Crash to Create-", was released in March 2012. It contains only the title track, which is nearly twenty-three minutes long, peaked at number 5 and spent 7 weeks on the charts. It is also the band's last release with Avex, and they returned to Universal Music in October. On Universal, Luna Sea released their sixteenth, and first double A-side, single "The End of the Dream/Rouge" on December 12.

A concert series titled Luna Sea Live 2012-2013 The End of the Dream was announced, with shows at Osaka-jō Hall on December 23 and the other six nights at the Nippon Budokan on January 11–13 and 18-20. It was their first concerts at both venues in 13 years. After the concerts sold out in one day of going on sale, the Zepp Tour 2012 Kourin (降臨) was announced to take place before them, with all performances being at Zepp live houses. It started on November 16 in Osaka and went to Nagoya, Fukuoka, Sapporo, and ended in Tokyo on December 16, with each venue being played two to three consecutive nights each. The Zepp tour was also sold out. Additionally, in a sequel to the previous year's charity performance at Saitama Super Arena, the band performed another at Sendai Sun Plaza on December 24.

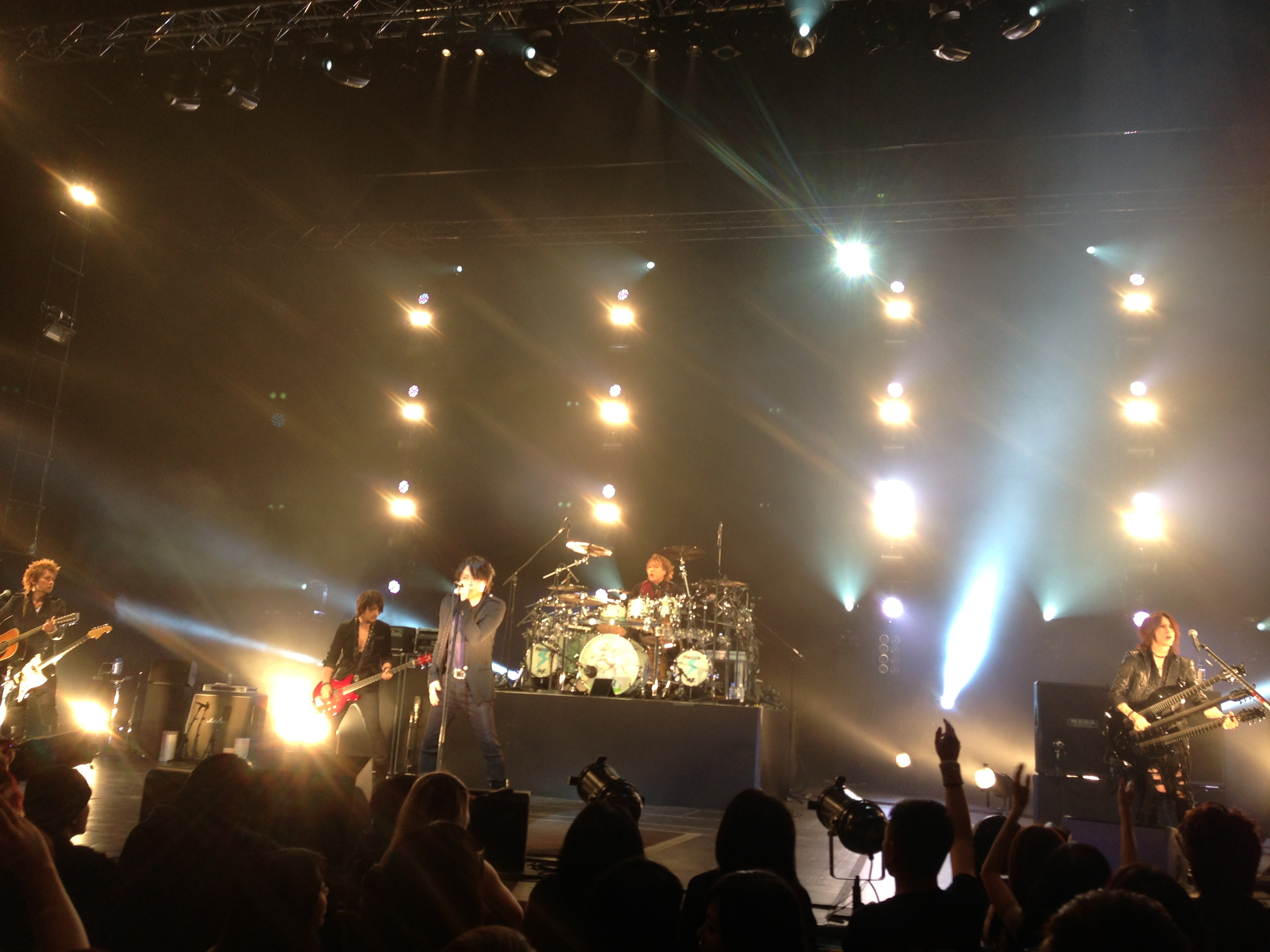
Luna Sea performing in Singapore in February 2013

Following the performances at the Budokan, another Asian tour started on January 26, 2013, with two shows in Taiwan, then moved to Hong Kong, Bangkok and ended on February 8 in Singapore. After the tour, Luna Sea also held an exclusive live performance for their official fan club members on February 17. Originally, NHK Hall was selected to hold the event, however, the band decided to change the location to Ryōgoku Kokugikan to serve excessive demands. The single "Thoughts" was released on August 28 in celebration of the band's 24th anniversary, and is featured in a TV commercial for the online video game Master of Chaos. The group's next single, "Ran", was released on November 13 and used as the theme song to the television drama Toshi Densetsu no Onna 2. Luna Sea performed at Fuji TV's 2013 FNS Kayōsai festival, which was broadcast live on December 4. A Will, the group's first new studio album in 13 years, became available on December 11, 2013.

2014 marks Luna Sea's 25th anniversary, and they celebrated the occasion in several ways. The band performed a fan club-only show on May 26 at Akasaka Blitz, at which they performed A Will in full, and announced four more fan club-only kurofuku gentei concerts at the Diver City (June 21–22) and Osaka (August 23–24) Zepp music halls. They released both the remastered compilation album 25th Anniversary Ultimate Best -The One- and the live compilation album Never Sold Out 2 on May 28, and performed a special anniversary concert at Yoyogi National Stadium on May 29. Their first nationwide tour since reuniting, Luna Sea 25th Anniversary Live Tour The Lunatic -A Liberated Will-, took place from June 7 to September 14 before picking up again in January 2015 and ending on March 1. Additional performances at Saitama Super Arena and Yokohama Arena took place at the end of 2014, on December 21 and 23 respectively.

As an epilogue to their 25th anniversary, Luna Sea hosted a rock festival titled Lunatic Fest on June 27 and 28, 2015, with an estimated 60,000 fans attending. Held at Makuhari Messe, there were three stages and 12 artists, with the host band performing twice both nights; once as opening act Lunacy and again as Luna Sea. Other acts included Dead End, Dir En Grey, X Japan, Siam Shade and Tokyo Yankees the first night, and Aion, Buck-Tick, D'erlanger, and Glay the second night.

=== 2016–2022: Luv, 30th Anniversary and Cross ===
The band provided the new song "Limit" to be used as the opening theme song for the Endride anime series. It was released as a single on June 22, 2016. They performed at Makuhari Messe on October 14 and 16 as part of the three-day Visual Japan Summit. On December 23 and 24, Luna Sea performed The Holy Night -Beyond the Limit- concerts at Saitama Super Arena. A limited single of a Christmas song titled "Holy Knight" was sold only at these concerts.

Luna Sea held a special concert at the Nippon Budokan on May 29, 2017, where Sugizo's guitar was powered only by hydrogen fuel cells, making it the first concert in history to be powered as such. They then headlined at the Summer Sonic Shanghai 2017 festival on August 26. The band's ninth studio album Luv was released on December 20. The equipment of all five members was powered by hydrogen fuel cells for their December 23 and 24 concerts at the Saitama Super Arena. The eighteen-date Luv Tour -World Left Behind- was set to begin with two concerts on January 27 and 28, 2018 at Mori no Hall 21 in Chiba, but these two concerts were rescheduled to May 23 and 24 due to Sugizo having the flu. Instead the tour began on February 3. The band hosted another two-day Lunatic Fest at Makuhari Messe on June 23 and 24, 2018. Performers who were not at the 2015 festival include Glim Spanky, lynch., Maki Ohguro, and The Oral Cigarettes.

Beginning the celebration of their 30th anniversary early, Luna Sea held two concerts titled Lunatic X'Mas 2018 -Introduction to the 30th Anniversary- at Saitama Super Arena on December 22 and 23, 2018. The first was subtitled "Image or Real" after their 1992 tour of the same name, while the second was subtitled "Search for My Eden" after their 1993 tour of the same name; each night saw them perform songs they had not played since the original tours. Ryuichi underwent surgery to remove adenocarcinoma of the lung in January 2019, and returned to work the following month. The band's eight major label studio albums from Image to Luv were released on vinyl record for the first time on May 29. That same day, a double A-side single titled "Sora no Uta ~Higher and Higher~/Hisōbi", the first and second opening themes of the Mobile Suit Gundam: The Origin - Advent of the Red Comet anime, was released. Luna Sea contributed a cover of TM Network's "Beyond the Time ~Moebius no Sora o Koete~" as the third opening theme of the anime. Anniversary concerts were held at the Nippon Budokan on May 31 and June 1, and in Hong Kong on June 7.

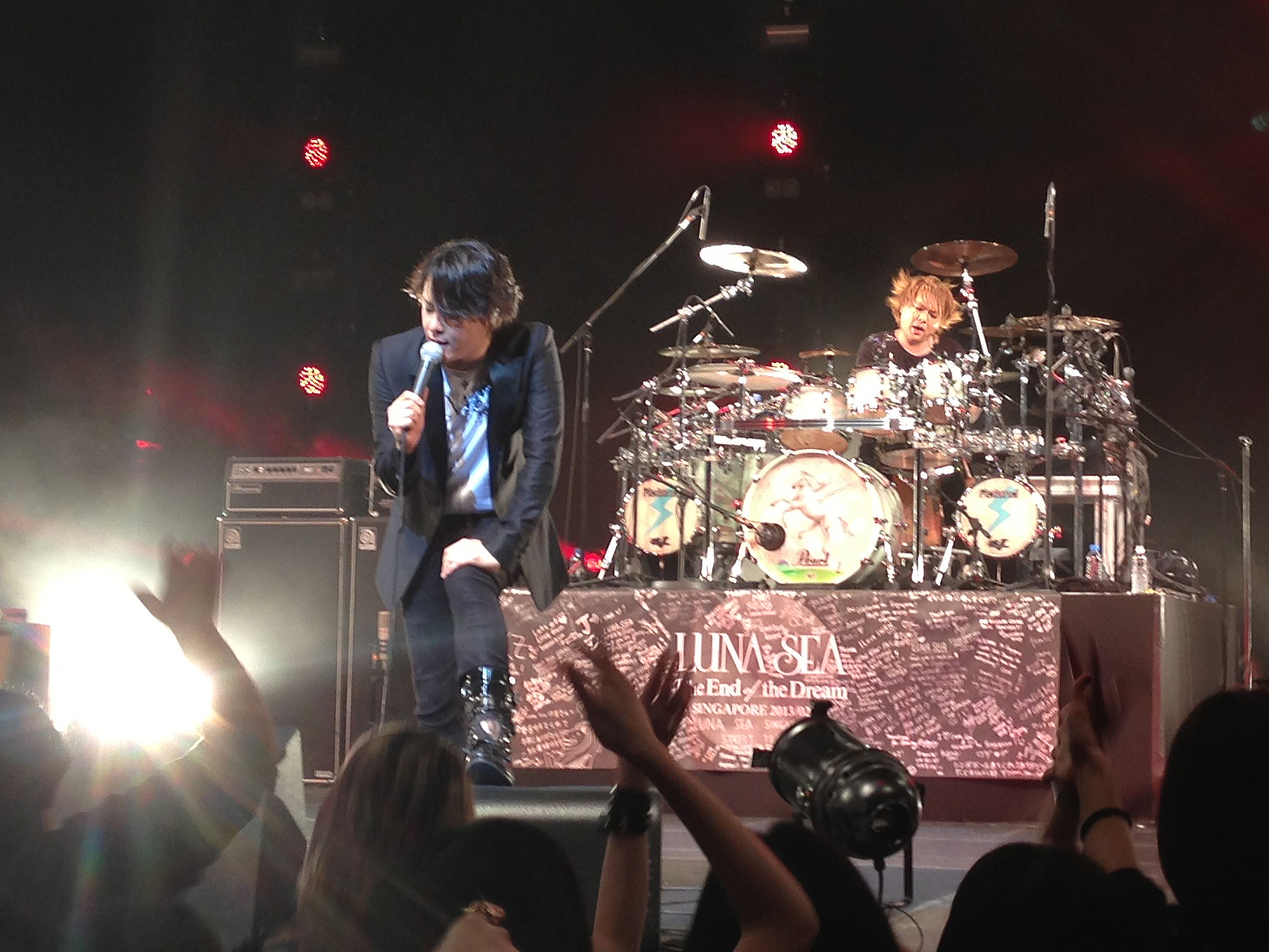
Luna Sea continued activities while Ryuichi (left) and Shinya (right) received separate cancer diagnoses in 2019 and 2020, respectively.

The band's tenth studio album, Cross, was released on December 18, 2019. Co-produced by Steve Lillywhite, it marks the first time the band has worked with a record producer. It was their first album to top Billboard Japan Hot Albums chart. On December 21 and 22 the band performed two 30th anniversary Christmas concerts at Saitama Super Arena. From February 1 to May 31, 2020, Luna Sea was scheduled to have a nationwide 30th anniversary hall tour titled Cross the Universe with over 29 performances in 13 cities. However, all tour performances from the end of February on were postponed until 2021 due to the COVID-19 pandemic in Japan. On April 28, 2020, the band released the digital song "Make a Vow", which was produced remotely within two weeks as an answer to the pandemic. A day later, their twenty-first single "The Beyond" was released in limited production. It became their first song in over 20 years to top the Oricon Singles Chart.

Inspired by One World: Together at Home, Luna Sea designed and hosted Music Aid Fest. ~For Post Pandemic~ on Fuji TV One on May 31 to support medical workers and others on the frontline of the COVID-19 pandemic. Essentially a television music festival featuring live remotely recorded performances to elicit monetary donations, over 25 artists participated, including Ellegarden, Char, Koda Kumi, and 9mm Parabellum Bullet. Luna Sea were set to perform at Saitama Super Arena on December 26 and 27, 2020 as their first concerts since the pandemic forced them to postpone their 30th anniversary tour earlier in the year. They were to be the band's first live streamed concerts with physical seats limited in capacity. However, both days were also postponed after Shinya tested positive for COVID-19 on the morning of December 26. These two shows, titled Reload, were finally held in 2021 on March 27 and 28. The seating was limited to 50% capacity or less and the shows featured a 20 minute break to allow ventilation in the arena. Following three days at the Tokyo Garden Theater from May 28–30, which were originally intended to be the Grand Final of the 30th anniversary tour, the rescheduled Cross the Universe tour began on June 12. The tour's new Grand Final shows were held at Saitama Super Arena on January 8 and 9, 2022, but the regular tour actually ended on February 1. Ryuichi then underwent surgery to remove microvascular lesions in his vocal cords and Luna Sea began a "recharging period".

=== 2022–present: 35th Anniversary and Shinya's death ===
Following Ryuichi's successful rehabilitation, Luna Sea resumed activities with two concerts at the Nippon Budokan titled Fukkatsusai -A New Voice- (復活祭 -A NEW VOICE-) on August 26 and 27, 2022. Gachi Sea, a cover band formed by comedians Kamaitachi, Hiroki Nunokawa of Tom Brown, and Shinya Takagi of Joyman, with the addition of Luna Sea's Shinya, performed during the encore of the first night. Two kurofuku gentei gigs took place on December 17 and 18 at Saitama Super Arena. Luna Sea played two nights at the Musashino Forest Sport Plaza on May 27 and 28, 2023, which marked the first time in about three years that the audience could cheer aloud, as it was previously not allowed due to COVID-19 guidelines. On May 29, the band held a short free live for 150 members of their fanclub at Meguro Rock-May-Kan. On November 29, Luna Sea released self-cover re-recordings of their albums Mother and Style via Avex Trax. From October 7 to December 31, they held a dual arena tour of 10 concerts at five venues where they alternated recreating the setlists of those two albums' tours, the 1995 Mother of Love, Mother of Hate tour and the 1996 Un Ending Style tour, respectively.

Luna Sea held the largest nationwide tour of their career in 2024, to commemorate their 35th anniversary. Split into three episodes, the 41-date Era to Era tour saw the band continue to alternate setlists from their old tours, adding the 1992 Image or Real, 1993 Search for My Eden, 1998 Shining Brightly, and 2000 Brand New Chaos tours into the mix. Episode 1 took place between May 25 and July 14, Episode 2 between July 27 and September 1, while the final Episode 3 took place between September 14 and November 15 and included several kurofuku gentei gigs performed under the Lunacy name. Additionally, a Memorial Talk & Unplugged Session for members of their fanclub was held at Culttz Kawasaki in their home prefecture on May 29, 2024. On February 22, 2025, Luna Sea reunited with Glay for The Millennium Eve 2025 joint concert at the Tokyo Dome, 25 years after the original. The following day saw the band's 35th anniversary tour end with their first solo Tokyo Dome concert in 14 years, Lunatic Tokyo 2025.

On September 8, 2025, it was announced that Shinya had been diagnosed with a brain tumor, and that, because the radiation therapy he would be undergoing could impair his mobility, his former protégé and Siam Shade drummer Jun-ji would be filling-in for him at Luna Sea's upcoming Lunatic Fest that November. Additionally, it was revealed that Shinya was previously diagnosed with stage IV colon cancer in 2020 and had continued to perform with the band while receiving treatment, which included radiation, chemotherapy and seven surgeries. The third Lunatic Fest was held at Makuhari Messe on November 8 and 9. Marking the tenth anniversary of the first festival, performing acts included The Yellow Monkey, Kuroyume, Uverworld, Ling Tosite Sigure, Nemophila and Brahman. Jun-ji also filled-in for Shinya at the 2025 Jinmirai Festival celebrating Brahman's 30th anniversary on November 24. Luna Sea were scheduled to hold Lunatic X'Mas 2025 -Our Journey Continues- at Ariake Arena on December 23, but postponed the show to March 12, 2026, after Sugizo was involved in a traffic accident on December 18. Shinya died at 6:16 pm on February 17, 2026, after his condition suddenly worsened. Luna Sea announced his death six days later. At Lunatic X'Mas 2025, the band performed with one of Shinya's drum sets on stage, played audio and video footage of him at several points, and announced that they will continue activities per his wishes. Their first new song in six years, "Forever", was released as a single on May 29 and features Shinya. The sold-out Unending Journey -Forever- tour began that same day and saw 33 shows in 22 cities, before ending on October 18. Following the 2026 Kumamoto earthquake, Luna Sea announced they would donate all proceeds from their Kumamoto-jo Hall performance to Kumamoto Prefecture. An additional four-date leg of the tour, subtitled To Rise, will take place in December at World Memorial Hall and Ariake Arena. Luna Sea will also perform at Uverworld's November 25 concert at LaLa Arena Tokyo-Bay.

To commemorate the 35th anniversary of the founding of their fan club, Luna Sea will hold the seven-date Dear Slaves 2027 tour exclusively for fan club members in five cities between March 16 and May 5, 2027.

== Musical style and influences ==
"Mother"
A 30-second sample of "Mother", the third single from the 1994 album of the same name. It is one of the band's songs to predominately feature violin by Sugizo.

"Hurt"
A 30-second sample of "Hurt", a hard rock song from Style (1996).

In the early 1990s, while still an indie band, Luna Sea's musical style was punk rock with gothic and hardcore punk tendencies. Recalling their sound when he first saw them live at the end of 1990, Yoshinobu Matoba, an editor of Rockin'f magazine, said Luna Sea blended elements of hard rock, punk, new wave, gothic and more, to create a style of rock he had never heard before. Ryutaro Hokari of OK Music noted that, although their sound is based in punk and hard rock, they showed a musical sophistication from the beginning of their major label career by incorporating tension chords, guitar synths and violins. Gota Nishidera recalled that the public's image of Luna Sea in the mid-1990s was, "A band that wears all-black, makeup, and repeatedly produced melodic killer tunes with fast beats." According to Alexey Eremenko of AllMusic, their sound is firmly based in '80s hard rock, with a "versatile, almost [progressive] approach to songwriting". Nishidera opined that the biggest difference between Luna Sea and their contemporaries was their rhythm section of Shinya, J, and Inoran, and their ability to control and freely manipulate silence and explosion. This has been echoed by music journalist Showgun Fuyu, who said Luna Sea have a meticulously crafted world that is best described as "mysterious" and "fantastical", with their unique style evident in moments of sudden breaks and precise stops. He also explained that many of their songs lack the Japanese concept of B-melodies, which was very uncommon in the 1990s; "They start with the main motif, then have an A-melody, a chorus, and then return to the main motif". Discussing their two guitarists, Nishidera explained that Inoran specializes in rhythmic aspects such as arpeggios, riffs and cutting, while Sugizo is in charge of the world view including the guitar solos. Fuyu wrote that Inoran's clean-toned arpeggios deepen the band's decadent yet mystical atmosphere, and described Sugizo's solos as showing influences from hard rock and heavy metal, while his chords and sound design have a new wave feel. He said this unique twin guitar interplay creates a style unlike that of traditional rock bands, in that it requires two guitarists and can not be rearranged for a single player. Sugizo stated that his personal guitar sound developed from trying to get the "psychedelic feel" of shoegaze bands in songs such as "Wish", "Rosier" and "Storm". While their earlier material featured intense and harsh vocals, Nishidera and music writer Takuya Ito both note that Ryuichi's singing style changed after the band's hiatus in 1997, when he adopted a more "mellow" style by the time of the album Shine. Ito said this gave the undeniable impression that the band had gotten "milder", but Eremenko described this "softer side" as being "equally [as] strong" as their earlier work.

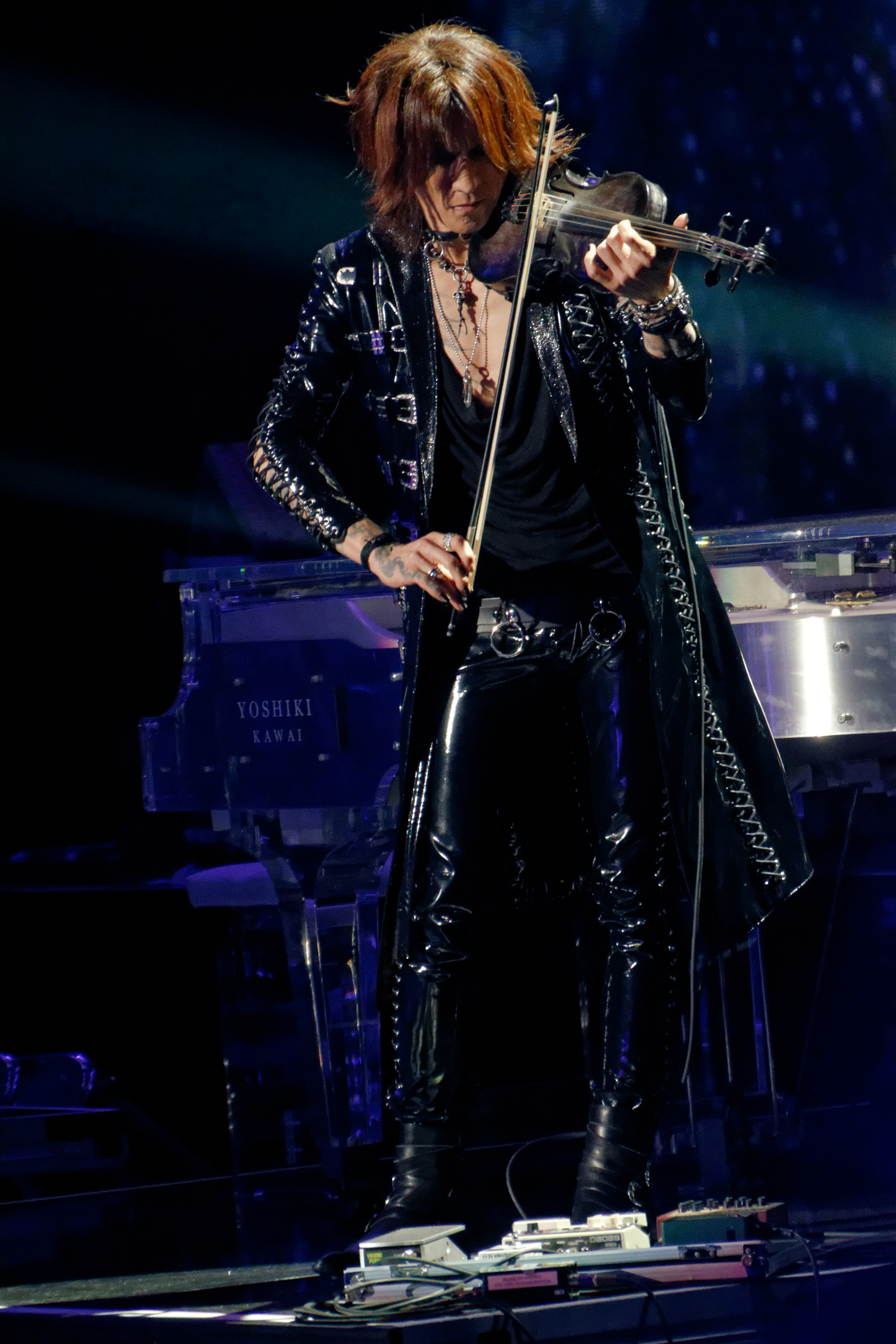
Several Luna Sea songs feature the violin played by Sugizo.

HMV Japan wrote that Luna Sea's appeal lies not only in their unparalleled good looks, but also in the individuality of each band member. They preferred different styles of music, and their individual music backgrounds influenced the band's style. As children, Sugizo and Shinya mastered the violin and the traditional taiko drums respectively, before forming a heavy metal band together in high school. Ryuichi liked the Beatles, Shinya had a tendency for Japanese pop, while Inoran, J and Sugizo loved hardcore punk. Sugizo liked England's indie music culture and experimental acts such as Ryuichi Sakamoto, Miles Davis and Frank Zappa, while J preferred the American rock scene. With such diverse musical tastes, Fuyu said it is almost miraculous that five musicians with such strong egos could coexist in the same band, and wrote that Luna Sea was born from the tension created as each member jostled for position, but understood their respective roles. One act that multiple members of the band have a common fondness for is Dead End, who had particular influence on them in the beginning, with Ryuichi being vocally and visually inspired by their frontman Morrie. Luna Sea and X Japan, despite their different musical styles, have had a close professional and personal relationship since the early 1990s, when they signed to Extasy Records. However, Fuyu opined that Luna Sea's "intense and profound spiritual world" was closer to that of Aion, with whom they had a mentor-disciple relationship, and their aesthetic lyricism was similar to Dead End, which makes them seem out-of-place in the more physical and yankī-like atmosphere of Extasy. Luna Sea operated via unanimous decision-making; all proposals were put to a vote, and if even one member dissented, the proposal was rejected.

Luna Sea's musical catalog encompasses songs in a diverse range of musical styles, including punk and post-punk (e.g. "Precious...", "Déjàvu", "Jesus"), gothic rock (e.g. "Moon", "Lastly"), hard rock (e.g. "Storm", "Hurt"), alternative rock (e.g. "True Blue", "Gravity"), progressive rock (e.g. "Genesis of Mind ~Yume no Kanata e~", "1999") and ballads (e.g. "Breathe", "Love Song"). Some of the band's songs feature the violin, played by Sugizo (e.g. "Providence", "Mother"). They have also written longer tracks, such as the nine- and ten-minute long ballads "Forever & Ever" and "Virgin Mary", and the twenty-three-minute "The One -Crash to Create-". When writing material, all the band members live together temporarily before they enter the studio to record. When one member brings in the initial idea for a song, all five develop it through jam sessions. The majority of the band's lyrics are in Japanese, but all songs usually include some English words or lines. While all lyrics and songwriting has been credited to Luna Sea as a whole since 1993, over the years the member who originally composed specific songs have been revealed by the band or otherwise learned. It is often believed that the lyrics are almost exclusively written by Ryuichi, whose music contributions are limited to "Until the Day I Die", "Lost World" and "Anagram". However, Inoran stated that this is not the case, as each member writes lyrics. For example, he said he writes the lyrics to his own songs. The majority of songs are originally composed by J, Inoran or Sugizo, with Shinya's only compositions being "Inside You", "Echo", and "Millennium", the last written with Sugizo. When asked if there was a message in their songs, Sugizo stated that there is no reason for Luna Sea to give a political message, only to create music that will stimulate the imagination and act as "a catalyst for realistic feedback." He personally attempts to "express all that psychedelica, house and drug culture in a rock, guitar-band format." Up until 2019's Cross, Luna Sea produced all of their music themselves, never working with a record producer. The majority of the artwork for their albums, singles and home videos, was designed by Ken Sakaguchi.

== Legacy ==
Luna Sea are considered pioneers of the visual kei movement, but transcended the scene to become one of Japan's leading rock bands. Nishidera wrote that Luna Sea created a "rhythm revolution" in Japanese rock that brought about a major change in Japanese music and led to teenage boys and girls picking up musical instruments across the country. Additionally, he suggested that, while there had been earlier instances of signature model instruments for specific musicians becoming popular, Luna Sea are the only example where the signature model of each band member has sustained popularity. Eremenko wrote that they "had an impact on literally hundreds of bands that followed in their wake in the next decade." Fuyu and Yoko Hattori of the music website Barks both wrote that the prevalence of twin guitars in visual kei rock bands, and the lack of a clear lead/rhythm distinction, is due to the influence of Luna Sea.

Acts that cite them as an influence or look up to them include Miyavi, Mucc, D, Ling Tosite Sigure, 9mm Parabellum Bullet, Base Ball Bear, Takuma of 10-Feet, Rottengraffty vocalists Nobuya and Naoki, Shinno of Nogod, members of Alice Nine, Tōru Kawauchi of 12012, Kei and Denka from Dio – Distraught Overlord, Aki of Sid, Kazuno, Touya and Ruka of Charlotte, Silver Ash leader Ling, Hazuki and Yusuke of Lynch., Dazzle Vision's Takuro, Kai from Esprit D'Air, several members of Nightmare, Akiya from Kagrra, and all five members of The Gazette. Glay guitarist Hisashi said Luna Sea's first album had a big impact on him, and his band's song "Tsuki ni Inoru" is heavily influenced by them. DuelJewel members Hayato and Yuya cited Luna Sea as the reason they entered the visual kei scene. Kra drummer Yasuno has said that he started playing drums because of Shinya, and their former guitarist Mai is also a fan of both Sugizo and Inoran. Back Number bassist Kazuya Kojima started playing bass because of J. The members of Versailles named Luna Sea and X Japan as influences, with singer Kamijo saying "I think there isn't anyone in the Japanese music business who hasn't been influenced by them." Similarly, Leda of Galneryus and Deluhi claims he was not even interested in music until a friend played him Luna Sea and X Japan. Unlucky Morpheus guitarist Shiren opined that Luna Sea is "in the blood" of every rock musician in Japan.

In 2003, HMV Japan ranked Luna Sea at number 90 on their list of the 100 most important Japanese pop acts. Mother was named one of the top albums from 1989 to 1998 in a 2004 issue of the music magazine Band Yarouze and number 49 on Bounce's 2009 list of 54 Standard Japanese Rock Albums. In 2018, Barks polled visual kei musicians born in the Heisei era on which artists influenced them, and Luna Sea came in fifteenth place. In 2021, Jamie Cansdale of Kerrang! included Mother on a list of 13 essential Japanese rock and metal albums.

In November 2025, the Odakyu Electric Railway began using Luna Sea's songs "Rosier" and "I for You" as train melodies at Hadano Station to commemorate the 70th anniversary of Hadano, Kanagawa, the hometown of J, Inoran, Sugizo and Shinya. A black granite monument featuring the handprints and signatures of all five members of Luna Sea was unveiled on Mahoroba Bridge, near the north exit of Hadano Station, on May 25, 2026. Additionally, two plaques commemorating the use of their songs as train melodies were installed at the north and south exits of the station.

== Members ==
Current members

- J – bass, backing vocals (1986–2000, 2007, 2008, 2010–present)
- Inoran – rhythm guitar, backing vocals (1986–2000, 2007, 2008, 2010–present)
- Sugizo – lead guitar, violin, backing vocals (1989–2000, 2007, 2008, 2010–present)
- Ryuichi – lead vocals (1989–2000, 2007, 2008, 2010–present)

Former members

- Yasu – lead vocals (1986–1989; died 2011)
- Shinya (真矢) – drums, percussion, backing vocals (1989–2000, 2007, 2008, 2010–2026; his death)

Support members

- Jun-ji (淳士) – drums (November 2025–present)

== Discography ==
=== Studio albums ===
- Luna Sea (1991)
- Image (1992)
- Eden (1993)
- Mother (1994)
- Style (1996)
- Shine (1998)
- Lunacy (2000)
- A Will (2013)
- Luv (2017)
- Cross (2019)
