= Ran (song) =

- Cover of the regular edition.

Single by Luna Sea

from the album A Will
- B-side: "Echo"
- Released: November 13, 2013
- Genre: Alternative rock
- Label: Universal
- Songwriter: Luna Sea
- Producer: Luna Sea

Luna Sea singles chronology
| "Thoughts" (2013) | "Ran" (2013) | "Limit" (2016) |

Music video
- "Ran" on YouTube

Teaser video
- "Ran" on YouTube

"Ran" (「乱」; romanized as "RUN" by the band) is the eighteenth single by Japanese rock band Luna Sea, released on November 13, 2013. It reached number 17 on the Oricon chart and number 24 on Billboard's Japan Hot 100.

== Overview ==
"Ran" was written by lead guitarist Sugizo, who stated the melody just "popped" into his head and who believes the song has a "nostalgic 90's melody." It was used as the theme song to the television drama Toshi Densetsu no Onna 2 (都市伝説の女), and is also the band's first single with a Japanese title. The version that appears on the album A Will has a slightly different intro than the single cut.

The B-side "Echo" is one of the few Luna Sea songs originally written by drummer Shinya, whom came up with one of the drum phrases while drunk. Sugizo stated that Inoran helped them flesh it out into a complete song, and that Inoran and himself switched their guitar roles for the track. When writing new material, the band lives together temporarily before going into a studio to record. However, the guitar for "Echo" was actually recorded while living together.

The single was released in three editions; the regular contains just the CD, Limited Edition A is on a high-fidelity SHM-CD and includes a Blu-ray of the title track's music video, Limited Edition B is a standard CD with the same video on a DVD instead. All three have different cover art.

== Track listing ==
All songs written and composed by Luna Sea.

1. "Ran" (「乱」; alternately "Run") - 4:14
  Originally composed by Sugizo.
2. "Echo" - 4:21
  Originally composed by Shinya.
