= A Will =

2013 studio album by Luna Sea

Studio album by Luna Sea
- Released: December 11, 2013
- Studios: Sound Dali; Victor; Sunshine; Kamome; Art Terror; A-tone Nishiazabu; A-tone Yotsuya
- Genres: Alternative rock; progressive rock
- Length: 54:16
- Label: Universal
- Producer: Luna Sea

Luna Sea chronology
Lunacy (2000)	A Will (2013)	Luv (2017)

Singles from A Will
- 1. "The End of the Dream/Rouge" Released: December 12, 2012; 2. "Thoughts" Released: August 28, 2013; 3. "Ran" Released: November 13, 2013

A Will is the eighth studio album by Japanese rock band Luna Sea, released on December 11, 2013. It is their first album of new material in over thirteen years, as they reunited in 2010 after disbanding in 2000. The album reached number 3 on both the Oricon Albums Chart and Billboard Japan.

== Overview ==
Commenting on the fact that the band had not created an album in so long, Sugizo stated "Each of us have become accomplished artists on our own, and it is more like we are all coming together as solo artists to make a Luna Sea album." He went on to compare A Will and the process of the band recording it to their first album and being a newly formed group; "You don’t make it to sell it; you do it as a pure expression of the self. What makes this album special is that it was born from that thought process." The band selected songs by going through those that each member had gathered through the years, writing them while living together. Many songs that did not end up being included on the album were partially recorded.

On the album's name, which Ryuichi suggested, Sugizo explained:

"WILL" just by itself is a word in future tense, expressing intent to do something; however the words "A WILL" mean "a testament" or "last request". It also has the nuance of pointing toward the future, and although it has a positive meaning, it also means that things are at a place where everything could come to an end and there would be no regrets.

== Composition ==
Speaking of the opening track "Anthem of Light", Sugizo said "These are wild times, but there's no reason to release negative energy just because of that; we made this song with the thought that it's precisely because we live in our current world that it's necessary for rock music to be the thing that brings light to it." Additionally, he believes there is no reason for Luna Sea to give a political message, only to create music that will "stimulate our imagination." J feels that "Anthem of Light" is an answer to their earlier song "Into the Sun", and that they both have similar rhythms and beats. He wrote "Glowing", which focuses on the "sexiness" of rock music, specifically for the current Luna Sea. He also remarked that despite it being a simple song, the band worked on it for months.

"Both "Maria" and "Gin no Tsuki" were first unveiled in 2010 at separate concerts at the Tokyo Dome as part of the band's reunion world tour, although the lyrics and arrangements of both have been reworked and the latter's titled changed from "Days of Repetition". The album version of "Ran" is slightly different from the single cut. Lead guitarist Sugizo described "Metamorphosis" as a "progressive piece in the form of hardcore/speed metal" where Shinya's drumming shines, and likened it to the band's earlier tracks "Fate" and "In Future". J remarked that the string section at the end of the last track "Grace" connects back to the first song on the album.

== Release ==
Three limited editions of A Will were produced: Limited Edition A includes the album on high-fidelity SHM-CD, a photobook, and a Blu-ray with the music videos for the four single tracks and their TV ads; Limited Edition B is a standard CD with the same video content on a DVD instead; the third contains the same contents as the prior edition but in a large case emulating the sleeve of an LP record. In commemoration of the album's release, Tower Records in Shibuya hosted a special event from December 5–23, 2013, where the band's instruments, behind the scenes photos, and items used in the album's creation were displayed. Never before seen footage and a preview of the album were also featured.

A Will and the band's other seven major label studio albums, up to Luv, were released on vinyl record for the first time on May 29, 2019.

== Reception ==
Fueled by their creative drive to shrug off the pressures of their reunion, music writer Takuya Ito said that on A Will, Luna Sea emanates a momentum and depth reminiscent of their past, but with a refined and mature aesthetic, and called it exactly what their fans were hoping for. He described it as being a precise balance of fast-paced, powerful rock, tasteful, lyrical mid-tempo tunes, and sweet, epic ballads.

== Track listing ==
All tracks are written by Luna Sea.

No.	Title	Length
1.	"Anthem of Light" (Originally composed by J.)	4:16
2.	"Rouge" (Originally composed by Sugizo.)	4:29
3.	"The End of The Dream" (Originally composed by J.)	4:00
4.	"Maria" (Originally composed by Inoran. Originally written by Inoran and Ryuichi.)	5:28
5.	"Glowing" (Originally composed by J.)	4:27
6.	"Ran (「乱」; romanized as "Run" by the band)" (Originally composed by Sugizo.)	4:28
7.	"Absorb" (Originally composed by Inoran.)	6:18
8.	"Metamorphosis" (Originally composed by Sugizo.)	5:47
9.	"Gin no Tsuki (銀ノ月)" (Originally composed by Sugizo.)	5:32
10.	"Thoughts" (Originally composed by Inoran.)	4:04
11.	"Grace" (Originally composed by J.)	5:11

== Personnel ==
Luna Sea

- Ryuichi – vocals
- Sugizo – guitar, violin
- Inoran – guitar
- J – bass
- Shinya – drums

Other

- Daisuke "d-kiku" Kikuchi – keyboards, sound effects and programming
- Ikuro Fujiwara – strings arrangement supervisor and conductor on "Anthem of Light", "Ran" and "Grace"
- MNP Strings – strings on "Anthem of Light", "Ran" and "Grace"
- Mayumi Tabata – strings copyist on "Anthem of Light", "Ran" and "Grace"
- Yumi Kawamura – female chorus on "Maria", "Absorb", "Gin no Tsuki" and "Thoughts"
- Junko Hirotani – female chorus on "Ran"
- U-Key zone – chorus arrangement on "Maria" and "Thoughts"

Production

- Kenichi Arai, Masaaki Taya, Atsuo Akabae, Yosuke Watanabe – recording engineers
- Stuart Hawkes – mastering
- Toshiyuki Suzuki – art direction
- Ryoko Kawagishi – design
- michiko – flower art
