= Limit (song) =

2016 single by Luna Sea

- Cover of the regular edition.

Single by Luna Sea

from the album Luv
- B-side: "I'll Stay With You"
- Released: June 22, 2016
- Genre: Alternative rock
- Label: Universal
- Songwriter: Luna Sea
- Producer: Luna Sea

Luna Sea singles chronology
"Ran" (2013)	"Limit" (2016)	"Sora no Uta ~Higher and Higher~/Hisōbi" (2019)

Music video
- "Limit" on YouTube

"Limit" is the nineteenth single by Japanese rock band Luna Sea, released on June 22, 2016. It reached number 14 on the Oricon chart and number 19 on Billboard's Japan Hot 100.

== Overview ==
"Limit" was written to be the opening theme song of the Endride anime after Luna Sea were approached by its staff. Thus it is the band's first work to be tied to an anime.

A 30-second commercial for the single utilizing footage of the song's music video was uploaded to YouTube on May 29. The full video was freely streamed on the band's website for only four hours from 20:00 to 24:00 during a full moon on June 20, 2016. As part of a promotion with the toy company Brokker, each band member had a Lego-like toy modeled after them. The figures served as the basis for a shortened, 3D animated recreation of the music video for "Limit" published on YouTube on September 21.

The single's b-side, "I'll Stay With You", was written by Sugizo and features him playing the violin.

== Release ==
The single was released in four editions; the regular contains just the two-track CD, Limited Edition A is on a high-fidelity SHM-CD and includes a Blu-ray of the title track's music video, Limited Edition B is a standard CD with the same video on a DVD instead. A special Endride edition includes just the title track and not the b-side. All four have different cover art.

== Track listing ==
All songs written and composed by Luna Sea.

1. "Limit" - 4:14
  Originally composed by J.
2. "I'll Stay With You" - 4:21
  Originally composed by Sugizo.
