= Endride =

Japanese multimedia franchise

- エンドライド
- Genre: Adventure, isekai
- Created by: Endride Project
- Developed by: Touko Machida
- Directed by: Keiji Gotoh
- Music by: Kōhei Tanaka; Imagine Project
- Country of origin: Japan
- Original language: Japanese
- No. of episodes: 24

Production
- Animators: Brain's Base; Lapin Track
- Production companies: Nippon Television; CyberAgent; 4Cast.co.jp; Nippon Television Music; Takara Tomy Arts

Original release
- Network: Nippon TV, Chukyo TV, Miyagi TV
- Release: April 3 – September 24, 2016

Related
- Video game

Endride: X Fragments
- Developer: CyberAgent
- Publisher: CyberAgent
- Platform: iOS, Android
- Released: JP: November 24, 2016
- Manga

Endride: Gleam of Dawn
- Written by: Hakurin
- Published by: Enterbrain
- Imprint: Famitsu Comic Clear
- Magazine: ComicWalker
- Original run: May 2016 – February 2017
- Volumes: 2

Endride (エンドライド, Endoraido) is a Japanese multimedia project that features an anime with the same name and a smartphone game named Endride: X Fragments (エンドライド ～X fragments～, Endoraido: Kurosu Furagumentsu). The project features the original character designs of Kazushi Hagiwara and Nobuhiro Watsuki. The anime television series by Brain's Base and Lapin Track, directed by Keiji Gotoh and written by Touko Machida aired from April 2, 2016, (Note: The anime premiered in Japan on April 2, 2016 at 26:30, which is 2:30 am on April 3, 2016.) to September 24, 2016. The smartphone game was released on November 24, 2016.

== Characters ==
=== Main characters ===
Shun Asanaga (浅永 瞬, Asanaga Shun) Voiced by: Kensho Ono (Japanese); Aaron Dismuke (English)

A 15-year-old boy from the surface who was transported to Endora after touching the mysterious crystal he found in his father's company. His Warp Relic is a sword. Despite his inexperience, he is surprisingly skilled with his Warp Relic, as he managed to master its usage in such a short amount of time, which prompts Emilio to use him to complete his revenge. He and Emilio are often at odds, despite that he shows concern for him. Because he is from the surface he should not be able to use a Warp Relic, so everyone was surprised that he even has one. It is possible that Shun's father may be aware of Endora's existence, in the first episode his outline and Delzaine's are seen together in front of the Adamas, while professor Asanaga was holding the crystal that pulled Shun to Endora. It's revealed that Shun is actually Delzaine's biological son and Emilio's cousin, and that he was stolen from Endora when he was just a baby by Professor Asanaga, who manipulated Emilio's father into bringing the Warp Particles to the surface before killing him. Shun was born with a weak body and succumbed to an outbreak in Endora. In an attempt to save his life, Delzaine gave him to Asanaga to be healed on the surface; but, Asanaga had no intention of returning the child and instead raised Shun as his own. He is the first character in the series whose Warp Relic evolved. Before Shun's father arrived in Endora, his wife was already expecting a child but there were complications during the pregnancy and the child was lost, so when Shun arrived, his mother had trouble sending him back to his birth home and, decided keep him and raise him. Even though he discovered the truth about himself, Shun still loves the parents who raised him, and considers them to be his true parents since he never knew his biological father. When Shun learned of his father's intentions in taking the Warp Particles from Endora, he could not agree with his plans, even though he understood them to some extent. In the end, Shun decides to return to the surface, believing that's where he truly belongs and with his father gone his mother had no one else.
Emilio Langheim (エミリオ, Emirio)
Voiced by: Toshiki Masuda (Japanese); Ian Sinclair (English)
The 16-year-old prince of Endora. He wants to avenge his father's death by killing Delzaine, the new King of Endora. His Warp Relic is a spear. Because of his mission of vengeance he is extremely wary of people and protective of those close to him. He is often picking a fight with Shun, in spite of that he looks out for him when push comes to shove. At first Emilio only wanted revenge against Delzaine, but after witnessing the events that were happening in his kingdom, he began to realize how little he knew about his own world. He once looked up to his foster father until he discovered that he may have been responsible for the death of his biological father. After Delzaine finally dies, Emilio began to wonder if it was really him who killed his birth father. He later discovers that Shun's father stole Delzaine's child years ago and was actually the one responsible for his father's murder. Emilio reveals to Shun that they are actually biological cousins and that Delzaine was his real father. One of Emilio's earliest memories was him waiting for his cousin to get better so that they could play because he lived in a castle full of adults and considered Shun to be his first real friend. He is the second character whose Warp Relic evolved. Emilio has not decided whether or not he will take the throne, but he finally lets go of his vendetta and is determined to help his country anyway he can. In the video game, Emilio has already been named king.
Alicia (アリシア, Alishia)
Voiced by: Karen Miyama (Japanese); Sarah Wiedenheft (English)
Emilio's childhood friend who is often with Falarion in the castle town. She gets dragged into in Shun and Emilio's adventure, though her cheerfulness gets her through it. Her Warp Relic is Falarion. Her mother was killed by bandits when she was a child and her father became a living Warp Relic trying to avenge her death. Because of what happened to her father, she's worried that something like that could also happen to Emilio. Alicia may harbor romantic feelings towards Emilio but she is uncertain about how she really feels about him, she decided to wait until Emilio sorted everything out before exploring her feelings for him.
Falarion (ファラリオン, Fararion)
Voiced by: Ayaka Ohashi (Japanese); Felecia Angelle (English)
A mysterious life form that appears to be a dragon and Alicia's pet and Warp Relic. It can understand human speech. When facing an opponent Falarion can increase in size to fight, he can also track other people who have Warp Relics. It is revealed that Falarion is Alicia's father when he was absorbed by his own Warp Relic, when it reached its final evolutionary stage, and became a living Warp Relic. Because her father's consciousness is lying dormant within Falarion, he never leaves Alicia's side.

=== Ignauts ===
Demetrio (デメトリオ, Demetorio)
Voiced by: Hiroki Takahashi (Japanese); Robert McCollum (English)
The leader of the rebel group "Ignauts". He draws many people to his cause with his intelligence and strength in battle. As a revolutionary, he has a hostile relationship with Prince Emilio. He is the only known member of the "Ignauts" who does not have a Warp Relic, but he uses twin swords that double as a whip and can fight right on par with anyone who uses a Warp Relic. He once had a Zoozian for a friend named Lucio, but he was killed by a lord, so he decided to get revenge on the world in the form of a revolution. With Delzaine dead he now steers the Ignauts towards restoring order to Endora.
Louise (ルイーズ, Ruīzu)
Voiced by: Shizuka Itō (Japanese); Janelle Lutz (English)
A member of Ignauts. She's a strong fighter who wields a giant sword as her Warp Relic. She is half Zoozian, a race of animal humanoids that are currently being persecuted by the Endras for their strength and power but because of her appearance she was able to pass for an Endra. She was working undercover for the Zoozian's serving Delzaine because she needed the money for her family, since her father is a Zoozian and her mother married him, no one would lend their support to them and they were forced to do the worst of jobs to make ends meet, but after Delzaine's death she decides to help the Ignauts restore order to kingdom. Not only is she a strong fighter, but she is also medically skilled she can treat injuries on a First Aid basis.
Eljuia (エルジュイア, Erujuia)
Voiced by: Kousuke Toriumi (Japanese); Tyler Walker (English)
A member of Ignauts who is no good in a battle but has a mysterious ability to predict the future. Because of his appearance he is often mistaken for a girl. He is very intuitive and sensitive to his surroundings. His Warp Relic is a cloth that serves as a barrier, which he controls at will.
Felix (フェリクス, Ferikusu)
Voiced by: Yūma Uchida (Japanese); Cris George (English)
A member of Ignauts who has a silent and cool personality, and adores Demetrio. He uses double swords to fight, but he can summon a Warp Relic sword if necessary. He often argues with Mischa. Demetrio saved him from the streets years ago, which is why he is fiercely loyal to him.
Mischa (ミーシャ, Mīsha)
Voiced by: Aoi Yūki (Japanese); Skyler McIntosh (English)
An assassin girl that was sent to take out Emilio, she started off as an orphan child, and then was taken and sold because of her Warp Relic. As an assassin she was taught that she needed to kill in order to survive. She was freed by Demetrio and was offered to join the Ignauts. Because of her training and upbringing, she shows little emotion. Her Warp Relic is a bunch of floating, exploding projectiles that she can control with her mind. She is also skilled in hand to hand combat so much so that she can keep up with Felix or Demetrio. It is unknown who sent her after Emilio but in Mischa's flashback that person had a portrait of Emilio hanging above her cage. Like all the other members of the Ignauts she looks up to Demetrio. Since she is so young, she is hard to take seriously but she is one of the fiercest members on the team. She and Felix are always competing.
Ralph (ラルフ, Rarufu)
Mainly serves as Demetrio's liaison for the Zoozians as well as an informant of Endora's overall situation. He has no Warp Relic.

=== Other characters ===
Delzaine (デルザイン, Deruzain)
Voiced by: Akio Ōtsuka (Japanese); Phil Parsons (English)
The current king of Endora. For reasons unknown, he wants to revive the Babel, a contraption that once connected Endora to the surface. It's said that he murdered Emilio's father, the former king. He may have also had a relationship with Shun's father because in the first episode there was a scene where they are having a conversation in front of the Adamas and in professor Asanaga's hands is the crystal that pulled Shun into Endora. Delzaine may be aware of the phenomenon that is causing the Warp particles in Endora to decrease because the incident began to take place around the time he was named king. Delzaine died protecting Shun and Emilio without revealing his intentions, however he stared at Shun as though he recognized him. It is revealed that Delzaine was Shun's biological father. When professor Asanaga first arrived in Endora, Delzaine was the first to suspect his motives often warning his older brother, the former king and Emilio's biological father, to be wary of him, but he would not listen. Shun was dying of illness as a baby and seeing no other alternative to save his life, Delzaine had professor Asanaga take him to the surface to find a cure for his illness, but because of that he could not make a move on the professor. After Asanaga killed the former king, he refused to return Shun to Delzaine, stating that if he cared about his son he should get him himself. The reason Delzaine wanted to restore Babel so badly was because he wanted to see his son again and to retrieve the stolen Warp Particles.
Pascal (パスカル, Pasukaru)
Voiced by: Yū Mizushima (Japanese); Mark Stoddard (English)
An eccentric scientist who used to be a Royal Researcher, until he questioned Delzaine's plans for reconstructing the Babel. In order to slow down its reconstruction, Pascal tampered with Babel's plans, so it could not be finished without him. He was Emilio's tutor as a child, until he was banished from the castle by Delzaine for questioning his motives on restoring the ruins. He does not have a Warp Relic, but he does have all sorts of crazy inventions which he sometimes shows off. Despite being a scientist, Pascal is not afraid of taking risks and relying on his strong intuition. He believes that Endora and the surface should remain separate from each other, therefore he plans to destroy Babel once they send Shun back to the surface.
Joseph (ヨセフ, Yosefu)
Voiced by: Yoshiki Nakajima (Japanese); Anthony Bowling (English)
A prodigious junior scientist at the Royal Laboratory with a passion for science similar to Pascal's, in fact Pascal is his scientific idol. He's always coming up with new ideas and inventions for the sake of science without considering the glory of his future prospects and is always thrilled when his idol pays him a compliment. He loves the idea of creating new inventions and discovering new scientific theories so much so that he sometimes gets happily lost in thought as he is trying to solve a complicated scientific problem. Delzaine believed that it was Pascal's replacement that figured out Babel's flawed planning but in fact it was Joseph.
Kazunobu Asanaga (浅永 和信, Asanaga Kazunobu)
Voiced by: Satoshi Mikami (Japanese); Chuck Huber (English)
Shun's adopted father. A scientist and a business man, Kazunobu was struggling to get some recognition in the scientific community, in the hopes of providing a better life for his wife and future child. He discovered Endora when he was examining the crystal that his wife had discovered, where he met Emilio's biological father, Alzerm, and Delzaine. He discovered that Alzerm was fascinated with the surface, and enticed him with stories about their technological prowess in order to gain his favor. Kazunobu also had a particular interest in the Warp Particles and Warp Relics in Endora, and used Alzerm to transfer the Warp Particles to the surface, so that he could study them, in exchange for restoring the ruins of Babel, with the false promise of a brighter future for Endora. When Shun was a baby, he fell sick from an outbreak and because he was born with a weak body his condition only worsened, Delzaine gave his son to the scientist in the hopes of curing his illness, but instead of returning Shun to his biological family, Asanaga decided to raise Shun himself, after his wife's initial pregnancy suffered complications, and the child died. Though he and Shun are not related, Kazunobu considers him to be his "precious son", and wanted them to move together as a family. He revealed to Shun that his work with the Warp Particles was used to help better the lives of the people on the surface, build his enterprise, as well as enabled him to pay the medical bills for treating his son's deadly illness, and wanted Shun to carry on his work. However, when Shun refused to follow his adopted father's footsteps, after discovering his true nature, Kazunobu warned Shun not to interfere with his plans because he would be forced to kill him too. Kazunobu was the one who killed Emilio's biological father, in order to take a sample of his body and create his own Warp Relic. In the end, Kazunobu was killed by Emilio at the ruins of Tir na Nog.
Makiko Asanaga (浅永 真紀子, Asanaga Makiko)
Voiced by: Ryoko Nagata (Japanese); Jessica Cavanagh (English)
Shun's adopted mother. A former archeologist, Makiko retired from work so she could take care of Shun. She loves her son, and is very protective of him. Before Shun first arrived to the surface, Makiko was expecting another child, but there were complications and the child was lost. When her husband came home with a sick Shun, she became very attached to him and wanted to keep him as her own, filling the void of the child she lost, she often worries for Shun because he came from Endora and fears that he will be hurt once he learns the truth of his origins. While her husband never told her about Endora's existence, she suspected that he knew something about the underground world. She was the one who discovered the Parinblue crystal that brought her husband to Endora.
Alzerm Langheim (アルゼルム, Aruzerumu)
Emilio's biological father, Delzaine's older brother and former king of Endora. Once he and his brother discovered Kazunobu Asanaga's unconscious body on the outskirts of the capital. When they found out that the man was from the surface, Alzerm became intrigued and brought him to the castle, there the king listened to his stories about life on the surface and became very interested, hoping that his kingdom would prosper just as greatly. Consumed with thoughts of the surface, Alzerm could think of nothing but of devising a way of going there, so that he could obtain supplies and new technologies from the other world, so much so that he valued the opinions of his surface world ally more than anyone else's, unaware that Asanaga was not his true friend, but rather he was using the king for his own gain. Once Alzerm had discovered this betrayal, it was too late, and Asanaga killed the king with his gun at the ruins of Babel. Alzerm took pride in his kingdom and wanted to expand upon it, he had hoped that with Asanaga's help, Endora would become as great as the surface.

=== Game characters ===
Some of the anime characters will be making a comeback in the game.

Kanata (カナタ, Kanata)
Voiced by: Natsuki Hanae
A young man from the surface who was sucked into Endora. Even though he normally looks unreliable, he displays leadership skills during tough situations.
Haruka (ハルカ, Haruka)
Voiced by: Minami Tsuda
A young woman from the surface who was sucked into Endora with her brother Kanata. She is excellent in both academics and sports. She is also great in doing household chores in place of her deceased mother. Capable of taking care of others, she earns a deep trust from friends.
Daniel (ダニエル, Daniel)
Voiced by: Yūki Ono
A warrior of Endora.
Denida (デニーダ, Denīda)
Voiced by: Sayaka Ōhara
Panicia (パニーシャ, Panīsha)
Voiced by: Kaori Ishihara
Antom (アントム, Antomu)
Voiced by: Masaya Matsukaze

== Media ==
The original character designs of the project are made by Kazushi Hagiwara and Nobuhiro Watsuki.

=== Anime ===
An original 24-episode anime television series produced by Brain's Base aired from April 2, 2016, to September 24, 2016. The series is directed by Keiji Gotoh and the story is written by Touko Machida. Its music is composed by Kōhei Tanaka and Imagine Project. The opening theme song is "Limit" by Luna Sea and the ending theme for the first half is "Go My Way" by Ryōta Fujimaki. For the second half, from episode 13 to 24, the ending theme is "Sekai wa Kawaru" (世界は変わる, lit. The World Changes) by Kazuyoshi Nakamura. Aniplus Asia aire the series in South-East Asia.

==== Episode list ====
No.	Title	Original release date
1	"Ride"; Transliteration: "Raido" (Japanese: ライド)	April 2, 2016
Shun Asanaga, a young man with an obsession with crystals, finds himself pulled into a world within one.
2	"Endora"; Transliteration: "Endora" (Japanese: エンドラ)	April 9, 2016
After escaping the castle, an encounter with an old friend helps reveal some of the mysteries surrounding Endora.
3	"Journey"; Transliteration: "Tabidachi" (Japanese: 旅立ち)	April 16, 2016
Shun and Emilio escape to a hideout but soon abandon it to begin their journey to defeat Delzaine.
4	"Ignauts"; Transliteration: "Igunātsu" (Japanese: イグナーツ)	April 23, 2016
When they're ambushed by a band of revolutionaries, Shun and Emilio make surprising new allies.
5	"Assault"; Transliteration: "Shūgeki" (Japanese: 襲撃)	April 30, 2016
Lacking in numbers to revolt, the Ignauts consider an alliance with the very group that attacks them.
6	"Determination"; Transliteration: "Ketsui" (Japanese: 決意)	May 7, 2016
After reuniting with Pascal and Alicia, Shun's determination to return home is stronger than ever.
7	"Girl"; Transliteration: "Shōjo" (Japanese: 少女)	May 14, 2016
While visiting the port city of Ametius to obtain a ship, a deadly killer threatens the adventure.
8	"Lone Isle"; Transliteration: "Kotō" (Japanese: 孤島)	May 21, 2016
After taking to the seas on a battered ship, the Ignauts head for an island to recruit the help of the Zoozians.
9	"Father and Son"; Transliteration: "Chichi to Ko" (Japanese: 父と子)	May 28, 2016
Alicia discovers the truth about her father during a surprise encounter with dragons.
10	"Feelings"; Transliteration: "Omoi" (Japanese: 想い)	June 4, 2016
As Delzaine and the Ignauts both close in on Babylon, Pascal attempts to solve the mystery of the decreasing Warp Particles.
11	"Depths"; Transliteration: "Shinsō" (Japanese: 深層)	June 11, 2016
Upon reaching Babylon, the Ignauts are deceived by more than its size and the traps that await inside.
12	"The Light of Babel"; Transliteration: "Baberu no Hikari" (Japanese: バベルの光)	June 25, 2016
The showdown reaches full swing as Babel starts up, bringing an end to an enemy in more than one way.
13	"Tracks"; Transliteration: "Kiseki" (Japanese: 軌跡)	July 2, 2016
While Pascal and Joseph are busy inspecting Babel, the others look back on how far they've come.
14	"Resume"; Transliteration: "Saiki" (Japanese: 再起)	July 9, 2016
With chaos and riots on the rise, the Ignauts make plans to bring order while marching back towards the capital for more research.
15	"Monster"; Transliteration: "Monsutā" (Japanese: モンスター)	July 16, 2016
When they attempt to save a crippled village, the Ignauts run into an old enemy and make an unexpected new ally.
16	"Longing"; Transliteration: "Dōkei" (Japanese: 憧憬)	July 23, 2016
In order to recruit the help of the Gradido and the island Zoozians, the Ignauts must fight back against a naval invasion.
17	"Return"; Transliteration: "Kikan" (Japanese: 帰還)	July 30, 2016
No sooner is the group welcomed home to the castle than a menace appears in the forest and threatens the capital.
18	"Prisoner"; Transliteration: "Shūjin" (Japanese: 囚人)	August 6, 2016
While fields and forests decay, deep under the dungeons of the castle, Shun and Emilio learn more about the past before being swept away.
19	"Surface"; Transliteration: "Chijō" (Japanese: 地上)	August 20, 2016
Taken to the surface, Shun introduces Emilio to his familiar world and a confrontation with Shun's father triggers some of Emilio's forgotten memories.
20	"Past"; Transliteration: "Kako" (Japanese: 過去)	September 3, 2016
After hearing Asanaga's shocking declaration, Shun and Emilio discover secrets of the past, the truth of their families, and a shared bond.
21	"Confrontation"; Transliteration: "Taiji" (Japanese: 対峙)	September 10, 2016
Though troubled by his father's actions, Shun learns about his motivation and the reason they're able to travel between worlds.
22	"Crisis"; Transliteration: "Kiki" (Japanese: 危機)	September 17, 2016
Back in Endora, the Ignauts face up against a monstrous Ibelda and learn about the ancient ruins which may be funneling Warp Particles to the surface.
23	"Showdown"; Transliteration: "Kettō" (Japanese: 決闘)	September 24, 2016
While Demetrio and the Ignauts battle Ibelda, Shun, Emilio and Falarion go to Tir Na Nog to destroy the device draining Warp Particles from Endora.
24	"Demise"; Transliteration: "Shūen" (Japanese: 終焉)	September 24, 2016
The final battle to determine the fate of Endora balances atop the high-reaching spire of Tir Na Nog.

=== Video game ===
The game was released in 2016. The game is illustrated by Hidari and its story is written by Takumi Miyajima. The game features a story different from the anime. Some of the anime characters will be making a comeback in the game. The game takes place three years after the anime.
