= Love Song (Luna Sea song) =

2000 single by Luna Sea

Single by Luna Sea
- B-side: "Into the Sun", "Until the Day I Die"
- Released: November 8, 2000
- Genre: Alternative rock
- Length: 19:20
- Label: Universal
- Songwriter: Luna Sea
- Producer: Luna Sea

Luna Sea singles chronology
"Tonight" (2000)	"Love Song" (2000)	"The One -Crash to Create-" (2012)

Music video
- "Love Song" on YouTube

"Love Song" is the fourteenth single by Japanese rock band Luna Sea, released on November 8, 2000. It turned out to be the band's last single, as they held a press conference on the day of its release and announced they would be disbanding. They later reunited in 2010, and released "The One -Crash to Create-" in 2012. "Love Song" reached number 4 on the Oricon Singles Chart, and charted for five weeks.

== Overview ==
"Love Song" was originally written and composed by Sugizo. He first wrote the acoustic guitar part and then the song's ending. The vocals came next, then the band arrangement and the guitar solo was the last part created. Although the song is from the Lunacy recording period, it was not included on the album. The single was released on November 8, 2000, and that same day Luna Sea held an emergency press conference in Hong Kong where they announced they would be disbanding the following month. Its music video was directed by Shūichi Tan. "Love Song" was covered by Kannivalism on 2007's Luna Sea Memorial Cover Album -Re:birth-.

"Into the Sun" is a 16-beat track, originally written and composed by J. He feels that "Anthem of Light" from Luna Sea's 2013 album A Will is an answer to "Into the Sun". The writer of both stated this as the reason the two tracks have similar rhythms and beats.

"Until the Day I Die" was originally composed by Ryuichi. Besides his vocals, the song only includes performances of acoustic guitar by Inoran and violin by Sugizo.

== Track listing ==
All songs written and composed by Luna Sea.

1. "Love Song" - 7:10
2. "Into the Sun" - 7:09
3. "Until the Day I Die" - 5:01
