= Ryuichi Kawamura =

Japanese singer (born 1970)

Ryuichi Kawamura 河村 隆一
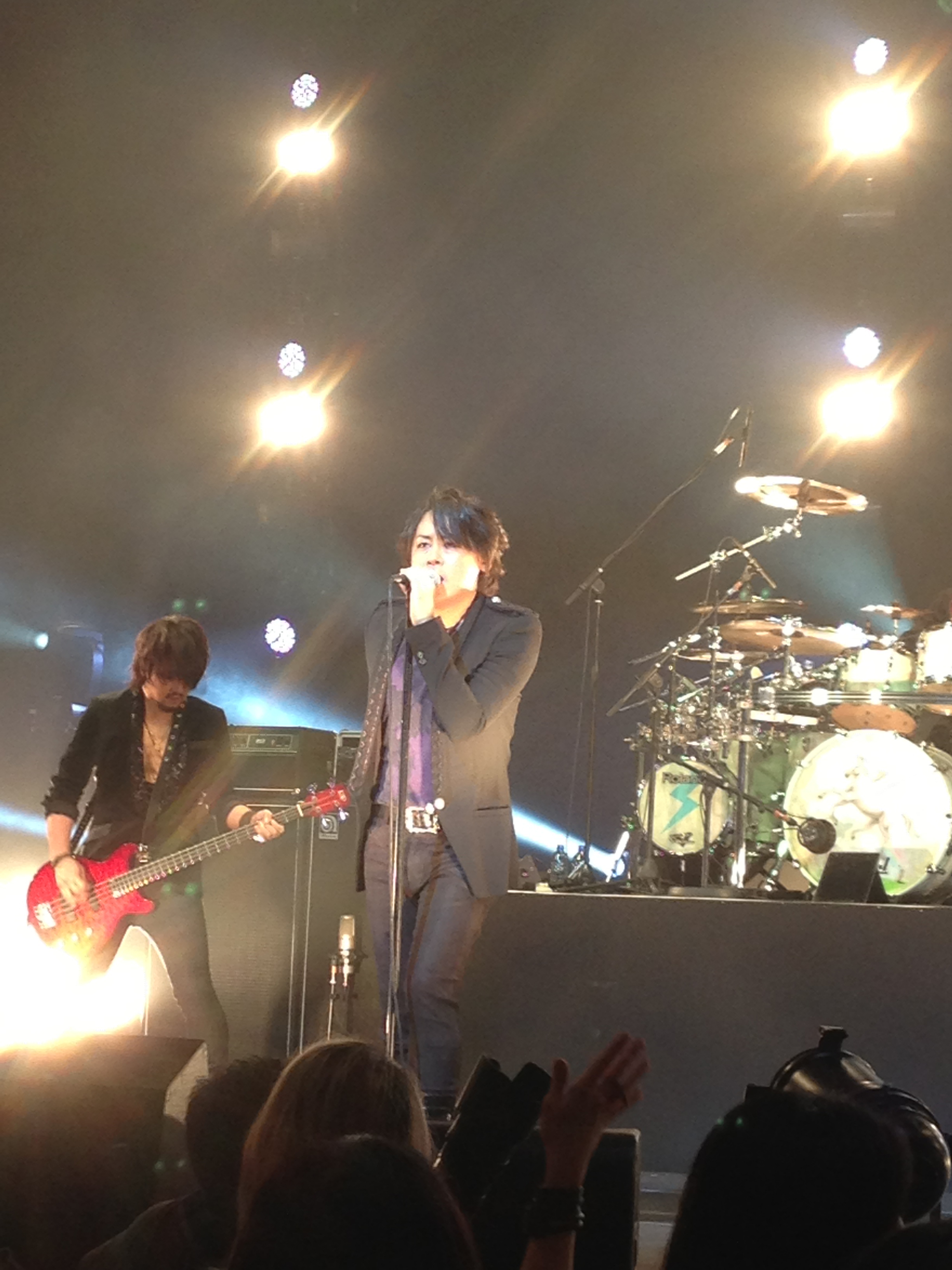
- Ryuichi (center) performing with Luna Sea in Singapore, 2013

Background information
- Also known as: ЯK, Rayla
- Born: May 20, 1970 (age 56); Yamato, Kanagawa, Japan
- Genres: Rock; J-pop
- Occupations: Musician; singer; songwriter; composer; record producer; actor; author; race car driver
- Instruments: Vocals; guitar; piano
- Years active: 1985–present
- Labels: Gai; Columbia; Avex
- Member of: Luna Sea; Tourbillon
- Website: www.kawamura-fc.com

Ryuichi Kawamura (Japanese: 河村 隆一, Hepburn: Kawamura Ryūichi; born May 20, 1970) is a Japanese singer, songwriter, record producer, actor and author. He is best known as lead singer of the rock band Luna Sea since 1989. They are regarded as one of the most influential bands in the visual kei scene. After they disbanded in 2000, he focused on his solo career as a pop singer, which began in 1997. In 2005, Kawamura formed Tourbillon with fellow Luna Sea member Inoran and Hiroaki Hayama. He rejoined Luna Sea when they reunited in August 2010.

Kawamura's first full-length album Love topped the Oricon Albums Chart with sales of 1,021,000 copies, making him the only male solo artist to have an album sell over one million copies within its initial week in the chart's history. It went on to sell 3.2 million copies, making it the best-selling male solo album in Japan. In 1997 alone, with his mini and full-length albums and four singles (of which "Glass" sold over one million itself), he sold over six million records.

== Early life ==
Ryuichi Kawamura was born in Yamato, Kanagawa on May 20, 1970. Because his father worked in the electrical industry, their household had a high-quality audio system. His father listened to jazz and orchestral music, while his mother was a fan of The Beatles. Whenever he was scolded and started to cry or sulk as a young child, Ryuichi would play music through headphones to calm down. He recalls that the first time he ever felt joy from singing was in kindergarten, when he sang alone for 20 or 30 of his classmates. His parents began splitting up when he was in the second grade, and Ryuichi chose to live with his mother. He was a member of the soccer club in elementary school and also played tennis, but continued to sing for his own enjoyment.

Ryuichi learned to play an acoustic guitar that was given to him by a relative. With his mother a fan of The Beatles, he began to admire the sound of an electric guitar and bought a white one for 15,000 yen when he was in fifth grade. But the bridge was rusted and he did not know about the existence of amplifiers. When he learned of amplifiers a little later, he became frustrated with guitar as he could not play fast enough to fit in the heavy metal boom of the time. Ryuichi also became frustrated with singing as he could not hit the high notes of heavy metal vocalists. "Instead of copying something, I realized I could make my own rules, so I formed a band and started writing original songs when I was in my second year of junior high school." He also began dyeing his hair red or purple at this time. In high school, Ryuichi realized he had not been taking singing seriously and became disillusioned with the daily grind of classes that he believed would not help him in the future. So he excised everything from his life except music, and threw himself into Japan's independent rock scene. He eventually dropped out of high school in order to pursue his goal of becoming a professional musician.

== Career ==
=== 1986–2000: Luna Sea, solo debut ===
Kawamura started his musical career as vocalist of the bands Cradle and Slaughter, while still in high school, under the name Rayla. When word got out that Slaughter was breaking up, Kawamura was quickly invited to join Lunacy in May 1989. In 1991, hide of X Japan found them on the indie circuit and eventually got them signed to X Japan co-founder Yoshiki's Extasy Records, where they changed their name to Luna Sea. They are considered one of the most influential bands in the visual kei movement, and have sold more than 10 million records in Japan. Ryuichi provided vocals for the B-side version of hide's 1994 song "Scanner". During Luna Sea's temporary break in 1997, Ryuichi started his solo career. Going by his full name, Ryuichi Kawamura, he changed his vocals and music from the powerful rock sound to more of a pop idol sound. That year, he released four singles, one mini-album and his first full-length album, Love. The album includes his cover version of the song "Namida Iro", which was formerly sung by Japanese female singer Noriko Sakai with his songwriting. Love topped the Oricon Albums Chart with sales of 1,021,000 copies, making him the only male solo artist to have an album sell over one million copies within its initial week of release in the chart's history. The album sold 2,788,000 copies by the end of the year, and 3.2 million in total. Kawamura later started his own production house titled RK, and in 1999, he went on to produce many artists including Azumaya Toga, Hideki and Izam.

Luna Sea disbanded at the end of 2000. Billboard later quoted music critic Hiromichi Ugaya as saying that the band broke up due to conflict between Kawamura and the other members. That same year, Kawamura started his first solo tour and created a subsidiary of RK intended for the production of film music. Shortly after, he composed music for the film So Faraway. In mid-2001, his fan-club RKF (Ryuichi Kawamura Family) opened. Later, Ryuichi released the singles "Shizuka na Yoru wa Futari Iyou" and "Julia". Kawamura started appearing on popular music shows including Music Station and Hey x3. Following the release of the single "Kimi no Mae de Paino o Hikou", he landed a role in the film Picaresque based on the life of Osamu Dazai.

=== 2002–2006: International tour, Tourbillon ===
His first international solo tour came in 2002 when he performed an exclusive concert in Seoul. When he returned to Japan, there were several meet and greet events at Zepp Fukuoka and Zepp Osaka, where he sold special merchandise (including manga he illustrated and figurines, etc.). Later, Kawamura starred as a lead role in the TV Asahi drama series Kowloon de Aimasho and also wrote the ending theme "Sugar Lady".

A special photobook was released in 2003 during his new tour. While putting his album and single releases on pause that year, he went on to produce artists such as Memory Cats and Kiyoshi. In 2004, Kawamura released the single "Spoon" and the album Vanilla, followed by a handful of tours. His fellow Luna Sea's bandmate Inoran was also a guest during his New Year's Eve live.

After taking a short vacation in Europe, Kawamura reunited with Inoran and Hiroaki Hayama to announce the formation of their band Tourbillon in 2005. Their first official concert was held at the Nippon Budokan on July 2 and it received good attendance and reviews. The band would release two albums, Heaven and A Tide of New Era in 2005 and 2006, respectively. In March 2008, Tourbillon's single "Break the Chain" was used as an opening theme of Kamen Rider Kiva.

=== 2006–2008: 10th Anniversary, Chicago on Broadway ===
In 2006, Kawamura released his first cover album, titled Evergreen ~Anata no Wasuremono~. He covered songs by artists such as Yutaka Ozaki and Akiko Kobayashi, as well as Luna Sea's "I for You". A year later, he released a second cover album to celebrate the 10th anniversary of his solo career. The covered songs included his original solo works and songs by other classic Japanese artists, such as Dead End, Kenji Sawada, Tetsurō Oda, and Dreams Come True.

On December 24, 2007, Kawamura reunited with Luna Sea for the concert God Bless You ~One Night Dejavu~ at the Tokyo Dome. The band played again at the hide memorial summit on May 4, 2008, along with X Japan, T.M.Revolution, Versailles and others.

On February 3, 2008, Kawamura held a special concert at the Nippon Budokan titled Yuki no Budokan ~70 Stories~ sponsored by Sports Nippon. The show celebrated the 10th anniversary of his solo career where he performed half of every song recorded from each of his six original albums, amounting to a 70-song set. Inoran also appeared to perform with Kawamura during the concert, which lasted four and a half hours. Ryuichi also sang the Japanese National Anthem for the occasional sporting event, including the 7th Grand Prix D1 series and one of the J-League's Kashima Antlers soccer game in March 2008.

In October 2008, Kawamura co-starred in the Broadway musical Chicago, along with Takarazuka stars Yoka Wao and Ryoko Yonekura, in which he played the lawyer Billy Flynn. This event marked the first time ever that a Japanese production of a Broadway music has been performed on Broadway.

=== 2009–2010: Sora, Luna Sea reunion ===
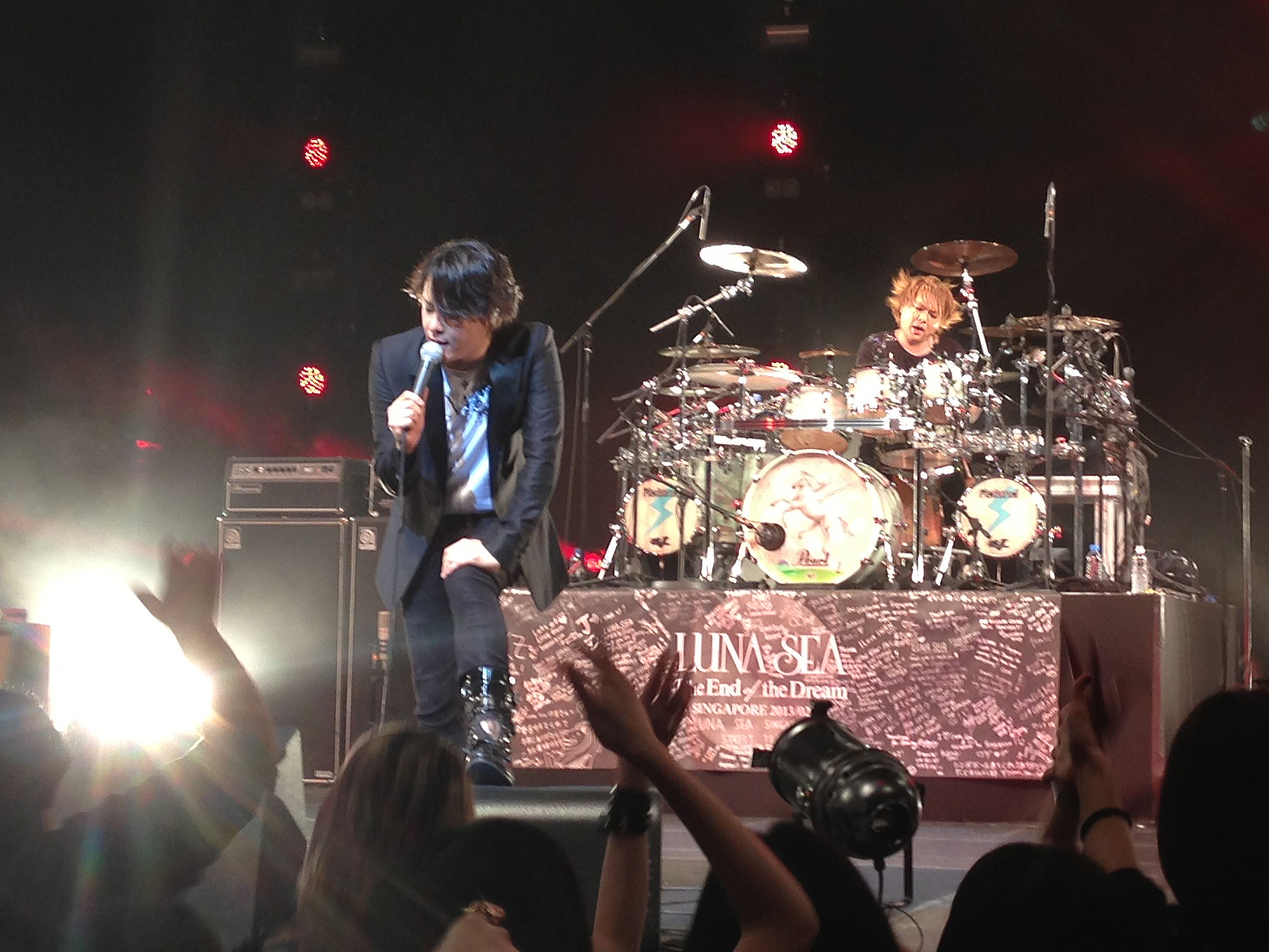
Kawamura performing with Luna Sea in 2013

Following an overseas performance in Hong Kong in March 2009, Kawamura released the single "Heroine" on February 4, which was a collaboration with Tetsurō Oda. He then released the album Piano on April 1, which included the environmental-conservation themed single "Midori no Uta".

In July, Kawamura released a photo book called Japanesque. He went on to perform an international tour in Taiwan in late August. On September 30, 2009, he released the single "Brilliant Stars", including a tie-up song with the jewellery brand GemCeree. With a new contract with Avex Group (after leaving Columbia Music Entertainment), Kawamura performed at the Hard na Yaon 2009 concert that same month along with many other artists from the company.

Following the single "Dakishimete" and the album Sora in February 2010, he would co-star in the second Broadway musical Chicago in June. Kawamura also performed the "No Mic, No Speakers Concert #003" tour from August through September, which, as the name suggests, was performed without a microphone or any type of electronic amplification. On August 13 he performed at the Jack in the Box 2010 Summer festival. Also in August, he appeared with the other members of Luna Sea at a press conference in Hong Kong, where they officially announced their reunion and their 20th Anniversary World Tour Reboot -to the New Moon-.

On October 17, Kawamura appeared in a television documentary, broadcast on BS Fuji, called Kawamura Ryuichi x Garyuu, in which he traveled to the famous Angkor Wat. He also participated in South Korean R&B singer Bobby Kim's album My Soul, writing Japanese lyrics for the song "Tsuioku no Kaze".

=== 2011: Breaking the Guinness World Record, Thailand debut ===
On January 7, Kawamura announced that he would give a special solo concert at the Nippon Budokan on March 13, 2011. At the concert, titled Genkai no Sono Saki e: 100 no Monogatari ~Epilogue~, he would perform a total of 100 songs over a span of more than 6 hours (back in February 2008, at a concert titled Yuki no Budokan ~70 Stories~, he sang 71 songs over a span of 4 hours at the same venue). However, due to the 2011 Tōhoku earthquake and tsunami on March 11, the concert was postponed. On May 3, he was successful, performing a total of 104 songs within 6 and a half hours and was awarded the Guinness World Record, beating the previous record of 100 songs within 8 hours.

Kawamura and his fellow Luna Sea member Sugizo collaborated with the musical group M.o.v.e to provide a theme song for the movie Gakudori. The song was called "Overtakers", was released on March 9, 2011, and featured Kawamura on vocals and Sugizo on guitar. He also released another cover album, The Voice, on March 9 covering hit songs by western artists, including "How Deep Is Your Love", "Ave Maria", "Amapola" and "Over The Rainbow".

On April 30, Kawamura held a charity concert in Thailand, titled Ryuichi Kawamura Exclusive One Night Only Charity Concert in Bangkok, in which he performed at the Royal Paragon Hall with the Bangkok Symphony Orchestra and special guest Pod (lead singer from Thai alternative rock band Modern Dog). Part of the proceeds were donated to the victims of the Tōhoku earthquake and tsunami.

On May 29, Kawamura and the rest of Luna Sea gave an interview, at the premier of Luna Sea 3D in Los Angeles at Toho Cinema Roppongi Hills, which was broadcast live on Ustream.tv. They announced a concert at the 30,000-seat Saitama Super Arena titled Luna Sea for Japan A Promise to the Brave on October 22. The profits of the performance went to the Japanese Red Cross to support the victims of the earthquake and tsunami.

Kawamura covered "Beauty and the Beast" for the cover album V-Rock Disney, which was released on September 7, 2011, and features visual kei artists covering Disney songs. His own song "Beat" was covered by Zuck on the compilation Crush! 2 -90's V-Rock Best Hit Cover Songs-, that was released on November 23, 2011, and features current visual kei bands covering songs from bands that were important to the '90s visual kei movement.

=== 2012–present ===
In April, Kawamura starred in the Legend of Galactic Heroes stage play Chapter 2: Free Planets Alliance Arc as the character Yang Wenli. Between June and July, Ryuichi performed Tour 2012: Close to You to celebrate the 15th anniversary of his solo career. In addition, on August 8, 2012, a fourth cover album titled The Voice II was released. It includes pop ballads originally sung by female singers and features Masami Tsuchiya and Ryuichi's Tourbillon bandmate Hiroaki Hayama.

Kawamura released two studio albums on July 8, 2020, Close to You and Account of a Dream. He released another, Beautiful Lie, in January 2021. For this album, musicians such as Yuji Adachi, George (Ladies Room), Hideki (Siam Shade), Hazuki (lynch.) and Mao (Sid) composed songs at Ryuichi's request after he was impressed when most of them supported him live at the Children of the New Age ~Shin Jidai no Kodomodachi e~ charity event he put on in August 2019.

== Musical style ==
Kawamura is best known for his vocal work in Luna Sea. At their onset, he was inspired both vocally and visually by Morrie, frontman of the heavy metal band Dead End. From the early to mid-90s, Ryuichi's style often included screamed singing during their hard rock songs. But after starting his solo career, it changed to a more "mellow" sound with traditional pop techniques. Since 2007, he has been singing in a more operatic style. Rottengraffty vocalist Nobuya cited Ryuichi as a big influence. After Sugizo told him that Ryuichi does not move around on stage much in order to focus on singing properly, Nobuya adopted this style himself. Mahiro Kurosaki of Kiryū also holds Ryuichi in high esteem.

When writing songs, Kawamura composes them on acoustic guitar or piano. He said he never suffers from writer's block. In the past, he would accumulate and save songs; at one point claiming to have around 200. But when it came time to choose from them, he would gradually lose track of the songs in his head while listening to them again. "That frightened me, so I decided not to keep a stock of songs. So now, I decide on a theme for the next album and concentrate on writing songs for about two weeks."

== Personal life ==
Kawamura met Miss Nippon 2002 Kumi Sano (佐野公美) in spring 2005, and they began dating that autumn. A representative for the couple visited their local ward office in Tokyo and registered their marriage on January 23, 2006. Kumi gave birth to their first child, a son, on June 18, 2009. On January 11, 2019, Kawamura underwent surgery to remove adenocarcinoma of the lung. The cancerous cells were completely removed and he returned to work the following month after a few weeks rest. He had another surgery that October to remove vocal cord polyps. In February 2022, Kawamura successfully underwent surgery to remove microvascular lesions in his vocal cords. He later revealed that he also had vocal cord nodules removed at that time. In an interview with Barks at the end of 2023, Kawamura revealed that he had been diagnosed with a vocal disorder, "the diagnosis varies depending on the doctor. However, I have found a regularity in which I always stumble at the same point".

Kawamura is good friends with his Luna Sea bandmate Inoran. Together, they are avid car racers. Kawamura also likes boxing and surfing, and says that he plans to open a surfing store once he retires from his singing career. He does not normally listen to music in his daily life, explaining, "When I listen to music, I can easily get into work mode, thinking, 'That chord progression is great', or, 'These lyrics are cool'.

== Achievements and awards ==
- Drama Academy Award - Best Newcomer (Spring 1997)
- Best Japanese Male Singer (1997)
- Oricon - Best Selling Male Solo Album - Love released in 1997
- Guinness World Record - Solo Artist Who Sings 100 Songs In 8 Hours (May 3, 2011)

== Discography ==
=== Studio albums ===
- Love (November 22, 1997), Oricon Albums Chart Peak Position: 1
  - 1998 4# yearly best-selling album with 2,798,170 copies sold
- Shinai ~Only One~ (深愛 〜only one〜) (December 19, 2001) 5
- Vanilla (April 7, 2004) 12
- Orange (June 20, 2007) 18
- Piano (January 4, 2009) 17
- Sora (February 24, 2010) 21
- Fantasia (August 31, 2011) 20
- Life (September 11, 2013) 16
- Magic Hour (October 28, 2015) 18
- Colors of Time (September 28, 2016) 29
- Close to You (July 8, 2020)
- Account of a Dream (July 8, 2020)
- Beautiful Lie (January 27, 2021)

=== Mini-albums ===
- Cranberry Soda (June 21, 1997) 1
  - Sold approximately 724,000 copies
- Ningen Shikkaku (人間失格) (July 17, 2002) 18
- Concept RRR 「Never Fear」 (October 1, 2014) 18

=== Compilation albums ===
- Very Best of Songs... (September 26, 2002) 8
- Dear... (March 24, 2004) 53

=== Cover albums ===
- Evergreen ~Anata no Wasuremono~ (evergreen 〜あなたの忘れ物〜) (May 24, 2006) 10
- Evergreen ~Anniversary Edition~ (December 5, 2007) 23
- The Voice (March 9, 2011) 34
- The Voice 2 (August 8, 2012) 40
- ЯK Standard "Kanata Made" (ЯK Standard「彼方まで」; 2017)

=== Live albums ===
- Ryuichi Kawamura Billboard Live 2018 Live Direct CD (May 16, 2018)

=== Singles ===
- "I Love You/Cielo" (February 21, 1997), Oricon Singles Chart Peak Position: 4
  - 25# yearly best-selling single with 753,640 copies sold
- "Glass" (April 23, 1997) 2
  - 15# yearly best-selling single with 1,011,350 copies sold
- "Beat" (July 18, 1997) 4
  - 21# yearly best-selling single with 778,470 copies sold
- "Love is..." (October 15, 1997) 4
  - 44# yearly best-selling single with 617,940 copies sold
- "Ne" (April 25, 2001) 5
- "Shizukana Yoru wa Futari de Iyō" (静かな夜は二人でいよう) (June 21, 2001) 6
- "Julia" (ジュリア) (August 22, 2001) 6
- "Kimi no Mae de Piano o Hikō" (君の前でピアノを弾こう) (October 24, 2001) 9
- "Koi o Shiyō yo" (恋をしようよ) (November 21, 2001) 18
- "Sugar Lady" (April 24, 2002) 12
- "F114B" (March 3, 2004, fan club only)
- "Spoon/Missing You" (March 3, 2004) 9
- "Dare no Tame Demo Naku Kimi ni..." (誰のためでもなく君に...) (April 18, 2007) 15
- "Once Again" (October 31, 2007) 27
- "Heroine" (ヒロイン) (February 4, 2009) 15
- "Brilliant Stars" (September 30, 2009) 9
- "Dakishimete" (抱きしめて) (January 20, 2010) 17
- "Yo ga Yonara..." (July 20, 2011) 29
- "Nanairo" (七色) (May 29, 2013) 26
  - Ending theme of Hakui no Namida

=== Home videos ===
- Time of Legend 1997~2002 (2002), Oricon DVDs Chart Peak Position: 20
- F120A (2003, fan club only)
- 70 no Monogatari" Yuki no Budokan (70の物語「雪の武道館」) (May 16, 2008, fan club only)
- Ryuichi Kawamura x Garyu -Dai Issho Hibiki- (December 15, 2010)
- Ryuichi Kawamura x Garyu -Dai Issho Private- (December 15, 2010)
- No Mic, No Speakers Concert Sekai Isan Angkor Isekigun vs Ryuichi Kawamura Kamigami no Tasogare (No Mic, No Speakers Concert 世界遺産アンコール遺跡群 vs Ryuichi Kawamura 神々の黄昏) (May 28, 2011) 138
- "Genkai no Sono Saki e" 100 no Monogatari (“限界のその先へ”100の物語) (November 2011, fan club only)
- Tour 2011 "Greatest Voice" ~Tamashī no Sakebi~ (Tour2011“GREATEST VOICE”〜魂の叫び〜) (August 2012, fan club only)

== Filmography ==
=== Films ===
- Buraikan
- Picaresque Ningen Shikkaku (ピカレスク 人間失格) (2002)

=== TV dramas ===
- Futari (ふたり) (1997)
- Narita Rikon (成田離婚) (1997)
- Kowloon de Aimashou (九龍で会いましょう) (2001)
- Number One (ナンバーワン) (2001)
- Food Fight Hong Kong Special Edition (2001)
- Hakui no Namida (白衣のなみだ) (2013)

== Bibliography ==
- Wave -Ryuichi Kawamura-
- 1997 Ryuichi Kawamura ~Natural~ (January 30, 1998)
- Diamond and Stones
- Ryuichi Kawamura Works "Your Tears are like Silver" (poem book)
- I Looked up at the Blue Sky (picture book)
- Deai ~Kono Netsu ga Same Teshimau Mae ni~ (novel)
- Glass Melody (novel)
- Dakishimete (February 10, 2009, novel co-written with Izumi Tadashi)
- Voices (December 24, 2010, autobiography)
