= Colobura cryptica =

Scientific classification
- Kingdom: Animalia
- Phylum: Arthropoda
- Clade: Pancrustacea
- Class: Insecta
- Order: Lepidoptera
- Family: Nymphalidae
- Genus: Colobura
- Species: C. cryptica

Binomial name
- Colobura cryptica Sapkota, Orellana & Willmott, 2026

Species of butterfly in the family Nymphalidae

Colobura cryptica is a nymphalid butterfly described in 2026 within the Neotropical genus Colobura Billberg, 1820. It had long been confused with its close relative Colobura annulata due to subtly overlapping adult morphology, and was formally recognized only after integrative taxonomic analyses combining morphology, genomics, and life history data revealed it to be a genetically and ecologically distinct lineage.

== Taxonomy ==
The genus Colobura was established by Billberg in 1820 and for much of its history was treated as monotypic, with Colobura dirce (Linnaeus, 1758) as the only recognized species. A second species, Colobura annulata, was described by Willmott, Constantino & Hall in 2001 based on differences in larval coloration and adult wing pattern.

The discovery of C. cryptica was initially prompted by a distinctive caterpillar phenotype observed by co-author Andrés Orellana on a Cecropia tree in Venezuela: the larvae entirely lacked the yellow rings and lateral spots characteristic of both previously known Colobura species. Subsequent examination of DNA barcode data in BOLD Systems revealed four distinct Barcode Index Number (BIN) clusters within the genus, two corresponding to C. dirce and two to individuals previously lumped under C. annulata. One of these latter clusters proved, on morphological and genomic examination, to represent an undescribed species.

Colobura cryptica was formally described by Sapkota, Orellana & Willmott in 2026 (published 4 May 2026). The holotype (male) was collected on 5 November 2024 at Tena–Loreto Road, Río Chalayacu, Napo, Ecuador (1000 m; 0°43'3"S, 77°40'56"W) and is to be deposited at the Instituto Nacional de Biodiversidad (INABIO), Quito, Ecuador. The specimen was attracted to rotting fish liquid beside a forested mountain river.

The specific epithet cryptica is a feminine Latin adjective meaning "hidden" or "concealed", given in reference to the subtle diagnostic characters that masked this species within C. annulata for so long.

== Description ==
=== Adult ===
The adult of C. cryptica closely resembles C. annulata and C. dirce, sharing the genus's characteristic intricate black patterning on a cream-colored ventral wing surface, which is thought to function as cryptic coloration mimicking tree bark. Forewing length in males averages 38 mm (range 36–40 mm). The key diagnostic character on the adult is on the ventral forewing: the third dark brown submarginal line from the distal margin does not cross vein M3, or if it crosses it, it is faded and terminates in the middle of cell M3–CuA1. In C. annulata, this line reaches all the way to the pale transverse band, while in C. dirce the line is distinctly swollen posteriorly. The dorsal forewing cream band is of even width throughout (as in C. annulata, but unlike C. dirce, where it often narrows at the costa). Male and female genitalia are not consistently distinguishable from those of other Colobura species.

=== Larva ===
The fifth-instar larva is entirely velvet black, with deep yellow head horns and scoli, and lacks both the yellow lateral spots at the anterior edge of abdominal segments present in C. dirce and the creamy yellow rings around each segment present in C. annulata. This larval phenotype is the most immediately obvious distinguishing feature of the species.

== Biology and life history ==
Colobura cryptica larvae feed on Cecropia (Urticaceae). In Venezuela, larvae are gregarious, occurring in clusters of around 30 individuals on the undersides of leaves of young Cecropia trees in secondary growth within humid premontane forest. Early-instar larvae feed collectively and chew through the primary leaf veins, causing the blade to fold into a "closed umbrella" shape, a behavior also observed in C. dirce. This behavior may reduce sap flow, facilitate feeding, or provide protection from predation. Larval development is highly synchronous; caterpillars molt and pupate at the same time, and adult eclosion occurs within approximately 15 days of pupation. Pupae measure up to 40 mm in length, are pale brown with irregular projections and dark warts that give them a bark-like appearance, and are cylindrical, tapering toward the cremaster.

Adults have been recorded throughout the year in Venezuela. The holotype was collected using a rotting fish liquid bait, and adults in Costa Rica were attracted to rotting fruit baits. The species occurs from sea level to at least 1,350 m and possibly as high as 1,800 m.

== Distribution ==
Colobura cryptica ranges from Chiapas in eastern Mexico southward through Central America to Panama, and in northwestern South America west of the Andes in Colombia and Ecuador, as well as along the east Andean foothills from Venezuela to southern Ecuador. Photographic records from iNaturalist suggest a possible additional range in Amazonian Brazil and southern Peru, but no barcoded specimens have yet confirmed this.
