= Idolator =

An idolator is a practitioner of idolatry.

Idolator or Idolater may also refer to:

- Idolators, a 1917 film
- Idolator (album), a 2005 album by Blood Stain Child
- Idolator, a 1986 album by Ole Evenrud
- "Idolater", a song by Opus from the 1985 album Solo
- "Idolater", a song by King of the Slums from the 1989 album Dandelions
