= Epsilon (disambiguation) =

Epsilon (Ε, ε) is the fifth letter of the Greek alphabet.

Epsilon may also refer to:

== Aviation ==
- Advance Epsilon, a Swiss paraglider design
- Socata TB 30 Epsilon, a French training aircraft design

== Arts and entertainment ==
=== Books ===
- Epsilon, the lowest caste of the World State in the novel Brave New World

=== Film and television ===
- E Channel, also known as Epsilontv, former name of Open TV, a Greek TV channel
- Epsilon, an AI fragment in the web series Red vs. Blue
- Epsilon (イプシロン), an elf girl and the fifth member of Shadow Garden in the light novel and anime series The Eminence in Shadow
- Epsilon (film) (also titled Alien Visitor) (1995) Australian–Italian science fiction film by Rolf de Heer
- Epsilon TV, a Greek regional TV channel

=== Music ===
- Epsilon (Blood Stain Child album)
- Epsilon (Dreamtale album)

=== Video games ===
- Epsilon, an antagonist in the video game Mega Man X: Command Mission
- The Epsilon Program, a fictional religious cult in the video game Grand Theft Auto V

== Mathematics ==
- Error in numerical analysis:
  - Machine epsilon, an error bound in computer arithmetic
  - absolute value of an approximation error
- The epsilon operator introduced by Hilbert
- An infinitesimal value

== Technology ==
- EPSILON (programming language)
- Epsilon (text editor)
- Epsilon (rocket), a Japanese solid-fuel satellite launcher
- GM Epsilon platform, an automobile platform
- Hyundai Epsilon engine

== Other uses ==
- Epsilon (wasp), a genus of wasps
- Hurricane Epsilon (2005)
- Hurricane Epsilon (2020)
- Lancia Epsilon, a car produced by Lancia
- MS Epsilon, a ROPAX ferry
- A subsidiary of marketing company Alliance Data
- SARS-CoV-2 Epsilon variant, a variant of SARS-CoV-2, the virus that causes COVID-19

== See also ==
- Latin epsilon (Ԑ, ԑ), a letter of the Latin alphabet
- Reversed Ze (Ԑ, ԑ), a letter of the Cyrillic alphabet
