= Mosaic (disambiguation) =

A mosaic is decorative art involving small pieces of glass, stone, or other material.

Mosaic may also refer to:

== Media ==
=== Literature ===
- Mosaic (magazine), an American Jewish magazine established in 2013
- Green Lantern: Mosaic, a 1992 DC Comics series
- Mosaic, a magazine published by the National Science Foundation from 1970 to 1992
- Mosaic a magazine published by the Wellcome Trust from 2014 to 2019
- Mosaic (Star Trek), a 1996 Star Trek: Voyager novel by Jeri Taylor

=== Film and television ===
- Mosaic (film), a 2007 animated film
- Mosaic (murder mystery), a 2018 television series (and a 2017 mobile app)
- Mosaic: World News from the Middle East, a program on LinkTV

=== Music ===
- Mosaic (vocal band), a band from the United States
- Mosaic: A Celebration of Blue Note Records, a 2009 album by the Blue Note 7
- Mosaic (311 album), 2017
- Mosaic (Art Blakey album), 1962
- Mosaic (Fennesz album), 2024
- Mosaic (Love of Diagrams album), 2007
- Mosaic (Theocracy album), 2023
- Mosaic (Wang Chung album), 1986
- Mosaic (Woven Hand album), 2006
- Mosaics (Graham Collier album), 1971
- Mosaics (Mark Heard album), 1985
- Mosaic, a 2006 album by Lenny Breau
- Mosaic a 2010 album by Ricky Skaggs
- "Mosaic", a 2012 song by Jolin Tsai from Muse

=== Video games ===
- Mosaic (video game), a 2019 video game

== Science ==
- MOSAiC Expedition, a 2019–2020 international scientific expedition into the Arctic Ocean
- Mosaic (genetics) or mosaicism, the presence of two populations of cells with different genotypes in one individual
- Mosaic evolution, a theory of evolutionary change
- Mosaic virus, a virus which attacks ornamental and crop plants
- Ludwigia sedioides, a tropical water plant known as the mosaic flower
- Colobura dirce or mosaic, a species of butterfly

== Software ==
- Mosaic (murder mystery), a mobile app (2017) and television series (2018)
- Mosaic (geodemography), classification software
- Mosaic (web browser), a web browser produced by the NCSA
- VMS Mosaic, a GUI web browser for use on the OpenVMS operating system
- Mosaic notation program, a music composition and notation program
- Pixelization

== Companies ==
- Mosaic Records, a jazz record label
- The Mosaic Company, a Fortune 500 chemical company
- Mosaic Inc., a solar finance company
- Mosaic Communications Corporation, former name of the Netscape Communications Corporation

== Other uses ==
- American Mosaic Journalism Prize, an award presented to freelance journalists
- Mosaic (church), a church in Los Angeles, California, U.S.
- Mosaic (Fabergé egg), a jewelled enameled Easter egg made under the supervision of Peter Carl Fabergé in 1914
- Mosaic Stadium, a football stadium in Regina, Saskatchewan
- Mosaic theory of the Fourth Amendment, a legal doctrine in American courts for considering issues of information collection, government transparency, and search and seizure
- Photographic mosaic, a picture created from tiled other pictures or photographs
- Cultural mosaic, a theoretical model of multiculturalism as seen in Canada
- Adjectival form of Moses, Biblical Hebrew leader and prophet; see Mosaic authorship, Mosaic law
- Mosaic, a multicultural festival held every year in Regina, Saskatchewan

== See also ==
- MOSAIC (disambiguation)
- Mosaicity consists of differently oriented crystallites
- Mosaik (disambiguation)
- Mozaic, a British musical group
- Mozaik, a multicultural folk band
- Mozaiq (album), a 2007 album by Blood Stain Child
