= Mosaik (disambiguation) =

Mosaik is a German comic book magazine.

Mosaik may also refer to:

- Mosaik 2014, an album by German group Kreidler
- Mosaik Solutions, American company

== See also ==
- Mosaic (disambiguation)
