= Blood Stain Child =

Japanese melodic death metal band

- Also known as: Visionquest (1999)
- Origin: Osaka, Japan
- Genres: Melodic death metal; electronica; electronicore; industrial metal
- Years active: 1999–present
- Labels: Pony Canyon, Coroner (EU), Dope Entertainment (KR), Metal Blade
- Members: Ryu; Aki (studio only); G.S.R; Sadew; Yasu; Ryo
- Past members: Daiki; Shiromasa; Violator; Sophia; Makoto; Kiki; Gami; Saika; Yakky
- Website: www.bloodstainchild.com

Blood Stain Child (stylised as BLOOD STAIN CHILD) is a Japanese melodic death metal band from Osaka. The band combines melodic death metal with electronic and trance. The band formed as Visionquest in 1999, but changed their name to Blood Stain Child in 2000.

== Background ==
Ryo (bass, lead vocals), Ryu (lead guitar, synth guitar), Daiki (rhythm guitar, synth guitar), Aki (keyboards, piano, synthesizers, backing vocals) and Violator (drums, percussion) formed Blood Stain Child, then called Visionquest, in 1999. In 2000, they took on their current name and recorded their first three-track demo in August 2000. The band sent that demo to a radio station. The DJ enjoyed the music and recommended the band to record label M&I Company, which signed Blood Stain Child.

In 2001, Blood Stain Child recorded the songs "The World" and "Steel Flame". The first was used as the theme song for professional wrestler Kensuke Sasaki and the second song was used as the theme song for the 30th anniversary of New Japan Pro-Wrestling, a professional wrestling promotion. In July 2002, Blood Stain released their debut studio album, Silence of Northern Hell. In October 2002, Blood Stain Child supported Dream Evil during their Japanese tour. In June 2003, Blood Stain Child released their second studio album, Mystic Your Heart, co-produced by Anssi Kippo from Finland.

In March 2005, Daiki left the band and was replaced with Shiromasa in April. That same year, Blood Stain Child released their third studio album, Idolator, co-produced by Tue Madsen from Denmark. In 2006, Blood Stain Child signed with Dockyard 1 and released Idolator in Europe on 27 November 2006. Idolator was later released in the United States through Locomotive Records on 17 July 2007.

In April 2007, Blood Stain Child announced new vocalist Sadew and new guitarist G.S.R. On 18 July 2007, Blood Stain Child released their fourth studio album, Mozaiq, in Japan, co-produced by Madsen. It was released in Europe on 20 July 2007 with an exclusive bonus track, "Cosmic Highway".

On 12 June 2010, Ryu announced on his official blog that Sadew left the band for personal reasons. Drummer Violator also left the band to take care of family business. In September, the band announced new members Sophia Aslanides (also known as Sophia Aslanidou, from Greece) on vocals and drummer Gami (ex-Youthquake), signing a contract with Italian label Coroner Records and Japanese record label Pony Canyon.

In April 2011, Blood Stain Child took part in a Studio Ghibli cover album titled Imaginary Flying Machines - Princess Ghibli, covering the songs "Itsumo Nando Demo" (Spirited Away) and "Teru no Uta" (Tales from Earthsea). In June 2011, the band performed at A-Kon in Dallas, Texas, together with D. Later that month, the band released their fifth studio album, Epsilon. The band started a Japanese tour from 19 August to 24 September. In December 2011, the band performed in Moscow, St. Petersburg, Ekaterinburg and Kyiv.

Blood Stain Child performed as special guests at Naka-Kon 2012, in Overland Park, Kansas, between 10–12 February. In March 2012, the band took part in another Princess Ghibli album, covering the song "Ai wa Hana Kimi wa Sonotane" (Only Yesterday). On 21 July, Aslanides officially announced that she was leaving Blood Stain Child. She later formed electronic metal band Season of Ghosts in 2013. New female vocalist Kiki joined the band on 3 December. In early 2013, the band introduced their new VJ/DJ - Makoto, along with an announcement of Aki being absent from further live shows due to "his personal issues", however, he would remain a member and take part in the creation of music. Makoto left in 2014.

Founding members Ryo and Kiki left Blood Stain Child in 2016. They were replaced with bassist Yakky and male vocalist Saika, respectively.

In 2018, Blood Stain Child teamed up with Danceroid singer Yuzuki to form the melodic death metal supergroup Yuzukingdom.

On 1 February 2019, Blood Stain Child released a new single, "Del-Sol", as well as an accompanying music video. Later that year, on 3 July, a new full-length album called Amateras was released featuring the same members as the previous single.

Yakky left the band after nine years on April 20, 2025. Shortly after, the band announced the return of original bassist/vocalist Ryo.

== Musical style ==
The band's sound includes screamed vocals complemented at times by traditional singing, with their overall musical style best classified as a mix between In Flames, Children of Bodom, and Soilwork. The band cites influences such as In Flames, Dark Tranquillity, HIM, X Japan, and Luna Sea.

== Band members ==
Current members

- Ryu – lead guitar, synth guitar (1999–present)
- Aki – keyboards, piano, synthesizers, backing vocals (1999–present, studio member since 2013)
- Ryo – bass (1999–2016, 2025–present), unclean vocals (2007–2016, 2025–present) lead vocals (1999–2007)
- G.S.R – rhythm guitar, synth guitar (2007–present)
- Sadew – lead vocals (2007–2010, 2018–present)
- Yasu – drums, percussion (2018–present)

Former members

- Daiki – rhythm guitar, synth guitar (1999–2005)
- Violator – drums, percussion (1999–2010)
- Gami – drums, percussion (2010–2018)
- Shiromasa – rhythm guitar, synth guitar (2005–2007)
- Sophia Aslanides – lead vocals (2010–2012)
- Kiki – lead vocals (2012–2016)
- Saika – lead vocals (2016–2018)
- Yakky – bass (2016–2025)
- Makoto – DJ, VJ, manipulator (2013–2014)

== Discography ==
EPs and Singles

- Last Stardust (2014)
- Nexus (2016)
- Tri Odyssey (2017)
- Del-Sol (2019)
- 2045 (2021)
- 共鳴領域 (with Pizuya's Cell, 2022)
- Starpeople (2025)
- Neola (2025)
- Generator (2025)

Albums

- Silence of Northern Hell (2002)
- Mystic Your Heart (2003)
- Idolator (2005)
- mozaíq (2007)
- εpsilon (2011)
- The Legend (Best of-album, 2018)
- Amateras (2019)
- Metalia and Cyberia (2024)

Music videos

- "Silence of Northern Hell" from Silence of Northern Hell
- "Truth" from Idolator
- "Freedom" from mozaíq
- "Last Stardust" from Last Stardust
- "Nexus" from Nexus
- "Tri Odyssey" from Tri Odyssey
- "Trance Dead Kingdom" from Tri Odyssey
- "gaia evolution" from Tri Odyssey
- "KAMUI-神威-" from The Legend
- "Del-Sol" from Amateras
- "皇～sumeragi～" from Amateras
- "Quintessa" from Metalia
- "Unreal World" from Cyberia
- Starpeople
- Neola

Appearances

- "The World" and "Steel Flame" on 超戦士の聖奏 (2002)
