= Barbarous English Fayre =

Compilation album by King of the Slums
- Released: June 1989
- Recorded: September 1987, June 1988, February 1989
- Studio: Twilight Studios, Salford; Out of the Blue, Manchester
- Label: Play Hard

King of the Slums chronology
| Barbarous English Fayre (1989) | Dandelions (1989) |

Barbarous English Fayre is a compilation album by the British band King of the Slums. Originally released on vinyl only in June 1989 on the Play Hard label, the album compiles early releases by the band. It reached number 4 on the UK Indie Chart in 1989. The album was reissued on vinyl and CD in January 1991 by Midnight Music.

== Track listing ==
1. "Simpering Blonde Bombshell"
2. "Bombs Away on Harpurhey"
3. "England's Leading Light"
4. "Mere Slip of a Lad"
5. "The Pennine Spitter"
6. "Up to the Fells"
7. "Full Speed Ahead"
8. "Venerate Me Utterly"
9. "Bedevilments Favourite Son"
10. "Leery Bleeder"
11. "Fanciable Headcase"
12. "Hard Core Pornography Star"
- Tracks 3, 5, 8 and 9 from England's Finest Hopes EP
- Tracks 2, 10-12 from Vicious British Boyfriend EP
