= Silence of Northern Hell =

Studio album by Blood Stain Child
- Released: 2002
- Genre: Power metal; melodic death metal
- Length: 31:15
- Label: M&I Records, Pony Canyon, One Music

Blood Stain Child chronology
The World (2001)	Silence of Northern Hell (2002)	Mystic Your Heart (2003)

Silence of Northern Hell is the debut album by Japanese melodic death metal band Blood Stain Child. It was released in 2002, by the Captain Rock label.

== Track listing ==
1. "Silence of Northern Hell" – 3:41
2. "Crimson Symphony" – 4:45
3. "Under the Sin of Grief" – 5:42
4. "Legend of Dark" – 4:03
5. "Requiem" – 4:49
6. "King of the Sacred Sword" – 4:50
7. "Infernal World" – 3:25

== Personnel ==
- Ryo – lead vocals, bass guitar
- Ryu – lead guitar
- Daika – rhythm guitar
- Aki – keyboards, piano, backing vocals
- Violator – drums, percussion
