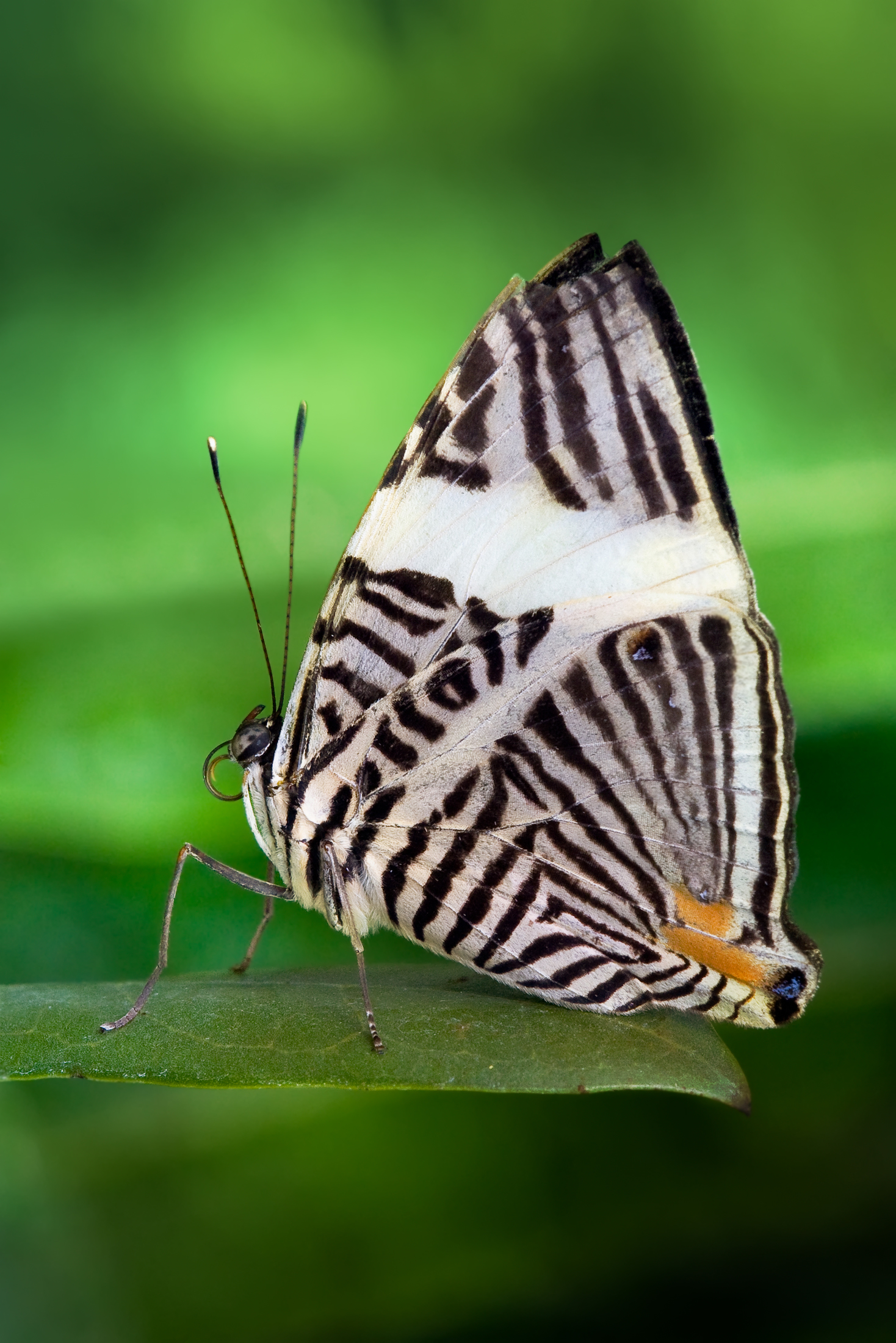
- Colobura dirce

Scientific classification
- Kingdom: Animalia
- Phylum: Arthropoda
- Clade: Pancrustacea
- Class: Insecta
- Order: Lepidoptera
- Family: Nymphalidae
- Tribe: Coeini
- Genus: Colobura; Billberg, 1820

Synonyms
- Gynoecia Doubleday, 1845

= Colobura =

Genus of butterflies

Colobura is a butterfly genus in the family Nymphalidae found from Mexico to South America.

== Species ==
There are three recognised species:

- Colobura annulata Willmot, Constantino & Hall, 2001 – new beauty
- Colobura cryptica Sapkota, Orellana & Willmott, 2026
- Colobura dirce (Linnaeus, 1758) – zebra mosaic
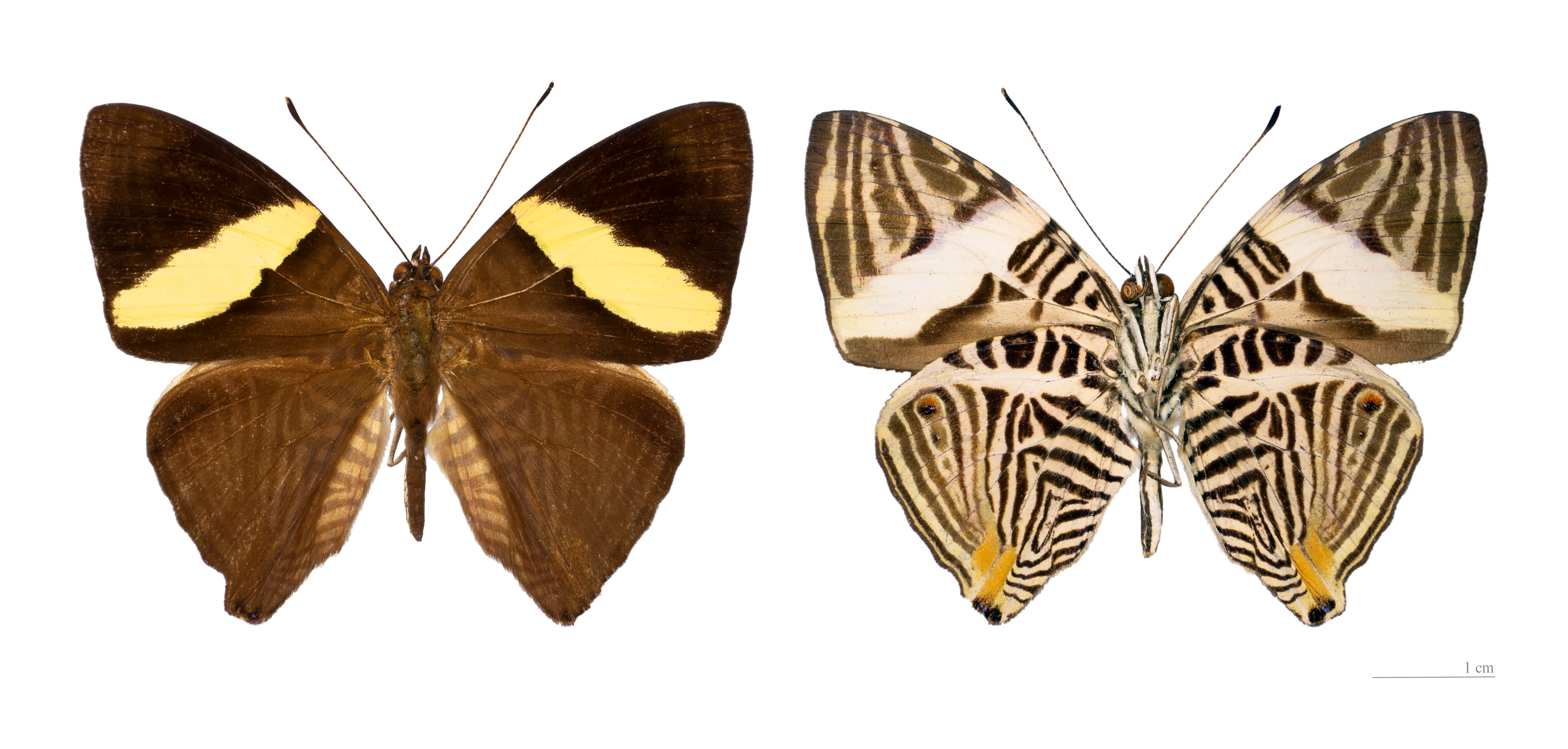
Colobura dirce - MHNT
