= MOSAIC =

MOSAIC may refer to:

- MOSAIC (computer) (Ministry of Supply Automatic Integrator and Computer), early British computer
- MOSAIC (housing cooperative)
- MOSAIC (organization), Canadian immigration and refugee support organization
- MOSAIC (web browser)
- MOSAIC Threat Assessment Systems
- Model of Syntax Acquisition in Children, instance of CHREST
- Mobile System for Accurate ICBM Control, predecessor of Global Positioning System

== See also ==
- Mosaic (disambiguation)
