= Mystic Your Heart =

Studio album by Blood Stain Child
- Released: June 18, 2003
- Genre: Melodic death metal, electronic
- Length: 49:35
- Language: English
- Label: M&I Company
- Producer: Blood Stain Child and Anssi Kippo

Blood Stain Child chronology
| Silence of Northern Hell (2002) | Mystic Your Heart (2003) | Idolator (2005) |

Mystic Your Heart is the second album by Japanese, melodic death metal band Blood Stain Child. It was released on June 18, 2003 on the M&I Company label. This album took on a more European metal sound along the lines of In Flames and Norther than their previous album. Finnish producer Anssi Kippo was hired to give the album that European sound the band was aiming for.

== Track listing ==
1. "Be in for Killing Myself" − 3:56
2. "∞System" − 2:50
3. "The Rise of All the Fall" − 3:45
4. "Mystic Your Heart" − 4:16
5. "Artificial Mind" − 4:01
6. "eM Solution" − 3:09
7. "Clone Life" − 3:25
8. "The Road to Ruin" − 3:47
9. "Deep Silent Memory" − 20:26
