= King of the Slums =

British Rock band

- Also known as: Slum Cathedral User
- Origin: Salford and Hulme, England
- Genres: Alternative rock
- Years active: 1986–1991, 2009–2021
- Labels: SLR, Play Hard, Midnight Music, Cherry Red
- Past members: Charley Keigher; Sarah Curtis; Jon Chandler; John Eccles; Stuart Owen; Nic Bate; Clarissa Trees
- Website: www.kingoftheslums.com

King of the Slums were a British alternative rock band. Formed in Greater Manchester in the mid-1980s, the band specialised in a kind of electric violin and guitar-driven rock music, and released their debut single in 1986. Whilst the band earned some critical acclaim from the UK music press, commercial success eluded them and the group disbanded in the early 1990s following the release of their second studio album, Blowzy Weirdos (1991). An album of new material plus some older songs appeared in 2009 credited to both King of the Slums and Slum Cathedral User, which was the original name of the group. Three more albums followed, Manco Diablo (2017), Artgod Dogs (2018) and Encrypted Contemporary Narratives (2020), before the death of frontman Charley Keigher in 2021.

== History ==
King of the Slums formed in Manchester, England, by writer Charley Keigher aka Charlie Keighera (vocals, guitar) and Sarah Curtis (electric violin), initially as Slum Cathedral User. Sarah Curtis had studied violin at the Royal Northern College of Music, but dropped out before finishing her studies. Joined by bassist John Eccles in early 1985, they recorded a demo tape at Crimson Studios in Urmston, Manchester with the help of a drummer who left the band soon after. The band took up its image of Kings of the slums incorporating a plastic dustbin and a tambourine replacing the drums which added to their 'Slums' authenticity when playing live. They won Muze magazine's Band of the Year competition, winning a recording session at a studio in Gorton, Manchester, producing a second demo tape. Their third demo tape came soon after at a recording studio in Uppermill high up in the Saddleworth Moor.

During the second and third demo tape recordings the group made its vinyl debut with the "Spider Psychiatry" single in 1986 on their own label, SLR Records. During this time they gigged at various Manchester venues as a three piece with their now trademark dustbin drum and homemade stage. The single, reviewed by Melody Maker, never achieved any significant sales. In mid-1987 Eccles left the band.

Further releases followed in 1988 and 1989 on the Play Hard label, now with bassist Jon Chandler and drummer Ged O'Brien (who replaced a succession of drummers), most of which were collected on the Barbarous English Fayre compilation album (1989). The band also recorded a session for John Peel's BBC Radio 1 show in 1988. A live performance of "Fanciable Headcase", shown on the influential Snub TV television programme, earned the band national exposure, and helped to push their EPs up the independent chart, "Bombs Away on Harpurhey" reaching No. 8.

After switching to Midnight Music, the band issued its debut album proper, Dandelions (1989), to favourable reviews in the British music press. Keigher and Curtis were now joined by a new rhythm section. The following year, King of the Slums signed to Cherry Red Records and issued the Blowzy Weirdos album in 1991, with Keigher's gritty take on British life again finding favour amongst the critics. Later in the year, however, the band broke up without ever achieving a commercial breakthrough to match their critical acclaim. They performed nearly 200 concerts during their career resulting in numerous bootlegs being circulated, all of which the band disowned.

In 2009 the reformed King of the Slums released their fourth album called The Orphaned Files, a collection of predominantly brand new songs together with some rare and remixed older songs, through SLR Records. It was followed by Manco Diablo on 8 June 2017, also on SLR. Three months after the release, the band decided to record Artgod Dogs. The album, featuring a new member, Clarissa Trees on violin and viola, came out on 19 May 2018. They performed a one off live concert at Manchester's Night and Day café on 23 June 2018. In February 2019 the band released a 4 track EP entitled Peak Human Experience limited to 300 copies on 12" vinyl. The release coincided with a string of tour dates, although some were cancelled due to the ill health of a band member. The band were set to play the Shiine On festival in Minehead in Nov 2019. Their last album Encrypted Contemporary Narratives (SLR Records) came out on 14 September 2020.

Frontman Charley Keigher died on 28 November 2021.

== Discography ==
=== Albums ===
- Barbarous English Fayre (Play Hard, 1989) (UK Indie #4)
- Dandelions (Midnight Music, 1989)
- Blowzy Weirdos (Cherry Red, 1991)
- The Orphaned Files (SLR Records, 2009)
- Manco Diablo (SLR Records, 2017)
- Artgod Dogs (SLR Records, 2018)
- Encrypted Contemporary Narratives (SLR Records, 2020)

=== Extended plays ===
- England's Finest Hopes EP (Play Hard, 1988)
- Vicious British Boyfriend EP (Play Hard, 1989)
- "Peak Human Experience" EP (SLR, 2019)

=== Singles ===
- "Spider Psychiatry" (SLR, 1986)
- "Haemophiliacs on Tacks" (Debris, 1987) – split flexi-disc with Moist
- "Bombs Away on Harpurhey" (Play Hard, 1989) (UK Indie #8)
- "Trouble at Mill" (Getout Fanzine Flexi Disc, 1989)
- "Once A Prefect" (Midnight Music, 1989)
- "It's Dead Smart" (Midnight Music, 1990)
- "Bear Wiv Me" (Fluorescent Mix) (Midnight Music, 1990)
- "Joy" (Cherry Red, 1991)
