= Season of Ghosts =

- Also known as: SoG
- Origin: Tokyo, Japan
- Genres: Electronic metal
- Years active: 2013–present
- Labels: Coroner Records; Howling Bull; Invictus Media
- Members: Sophia Aslanides; Zombie Sam

Season of Ghosts (abbreviated SoG) is an electronic metal band formed in 2013 by Greek singer Sophia Aslanides (also known as Aslanidou), former vocalist of the melodic death metal band Blood Stain Child. Season of Ghosts combines metal, trance and electronic sounds. Formed in Tokyo, Japan, the group has been based in London, England since 2018.

== History ==
In 2012, Venezuela-born Greek vocalist Sophia Aslanides parted ways with Japanese metal band Blood Stain Child, citing musical and personal differences. Aslanides was part of Blood Stain Child for two years appearing on one album, one EP, and two collaboration albums.

While still in Blood Stain Child, Aslanides conceived her next project, Season Of Ghosts, which came to life in October 2013 in Tokyo, Japan, with the release of a popular Disney cover, "Sarah's Theme" from the film Hocus Pocus, produced by Zombie Sam. Earlier that same year, Sophia collaborated with ZOMBIE SAM, appearing as guest vocalist on "A Hallow Tale" and "The Awake" on the band's debut album, Self Conscious Insanity. The band's first live performance came exactly a year after, at the Metal Female Voices Festival.

In September 2014, Season Of Ghosts signed with Coroner Records before the release of their debut album.

=== The Human Paradox (2014) ===
The band's debut album, The Human Paradox, was released internationally on December 8, 2014 and on July 8, 2015 in Japan. Howling Bull Records released the album in Japan.

The album saw Aslanides partnering with guitarist Zombie Sam of the band ZOMBIE SAM, supported by session members Paul Dark Brown on bass and Max Buell on drums during live performances.

Aslanides was in control of the music's composition, lyrics, and co-production as well as both the melodic and distorted vocals on the album. Human Paradox was mixed and mastered by Ettore Rigotti at the Metal House Studio, with co-production from Zombie Sam and development from NeroArgento. MiA from Japanese Visual Kei metal band Mejibray appears as guest guitarist on some tracks.

On December 23, 2015, the band released a remix album of The Human Paradox called Remixing the Paradox. Released by Invictus Media the album features remixes of tracks on the original album from Zombie Sam, Neuroticfish, Rotersand, Frozen Plasma, FGFC820, Fatal FE, and others.

=== A Leap of Faith (2018) ===
Season Of Ghosts released their next album, A Leap of Faith, on October 23, 2018, under their own label Invictus Media. The group relocated to London, England soon after.

The album was preceded by the release of two singles. The debut single "A Place to Call Home" was released in July 2018, and the title track of the album "A Leap of Faith" was released in October 2018.

=== Third album ===
On August 5, 2022, the band released a new single, "The Great Unknown", which will be featured on the band's upcoming third album.

== Members ==
- Sophia Aslanides – vocals
- Zombie Sam – guitar

Session musicians

- Max Buell – drums
- Paul Dark Brown – bass

Former session members

- Declan Doran

== Discography ==
=== Albums ===
- The Human Paradox (2014)
- A Leap of Faith (2018)
