= Blowzy Weirdos =

Studio album by King of the Slums
- Released: 1991
- Label: Cherry Red

King of the Slums chronology
Dandelions (1988)	Blowzy Weirdos (1991)

Professional ratings
Review scores
Source	Rating
Allmusic	4.5/5 stars

Blowzy Weirdos is an album by the British band King of the Slums, released in 1991 on the Cherry Red label.

== Track listing ==
1. "Gone All Weirdo"
2. "Smile So Big"
3. "Casin' the Joint"
4. "Keepin' It All Sweet"
5. "Hot Pot Shebeen"
6. "Clubland Gangs"
7. "Joy"
8. "Rimo (F. Rimson)"
9. "Mard Arse"
10. "Mood On"
11. "Blowzy Luv of Life"
12. "Casin' the Joint (Rollin')"
13. "Gone All Weirdo (Reaper Mix)"
14. "Skunkweed Joy"
15. "Smiles (Big Smiles Mix)"
