= Dandelions (album) =

Studio album by King of the Slums
- Released: 1989
- Studio: Sinewave Studios, Birmingham
- Label: Midnight Music
- Producer: Al McKerchar, King of the Slums

King of the Slums chronology
Barbarous English Fayre (1989)	Dandelions (1989)	Blowzy Weirdos (1991)

Dandelions is the debut album by the British band King of the Slums, released in 1989 on the Midnight Music label.

== Track listing ==
All lyrics by Charley Keigher; all music by Charley Keigher and Sarah Curtis

1. "Schooley"
2. "Armed Robbery"
3. "Unfit Mother"
4. "Violate Nothing But the Best"
5. "Up She Rises"
6. "Barbarous Superiors"
7. "Idolater"
8. "Ardent Swains"
9. "Up the Empire/Balls to the Bulldog Breed"
10. "Psycho Motorbike Ride"
11. "Bear With Me"

== Personnel ==
King of the Slums

- Charley Keigher - vocals
- Gary Sparkes - guitar
- James Cashan - bass
- Sarah Curtis - electric violin
- Stuart Owen - drums, tambourine
