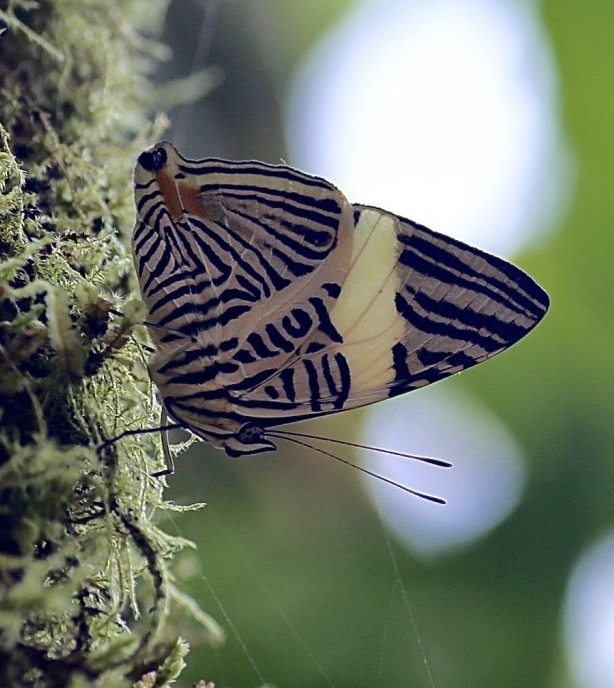

Scientific classification
- Domain: Eukaryota
- Kingdom: Animalia
- Phylum: Arthropoda
- Class: Insecta
- Order: Lepidoptera
- Family: Nymphalidae
- Genus: Colobura
- Species: C. annulata

Binomial name
- Colobura annulata Willmott, Constantino & Hall, 2001

= Colobura annulata =

Species of butterfly

Colobura annulata, the new beauty, is a butterfly of the family Nymphalidae. It is found in Central America (as far north as southern California and northern Texas) and the northern parts of South America.
