= Mosaik Solutions =

American technology company

Mosaik Solutions (formerly American Roamer) was a company that specializes in wireless coverage data and wireless coverage maps, based in Memphis, Tennessee before being acquired by Ookla.

The company collects and crowdsources carrier signal quality from major telecommunications providers or users who have its consumer or enterprise mobile application installed. The data is used to provide insights into places around the world without access to cellular coverage and the development of new coverage patterns, as well as to provide maps showing what provider offers the best service in an area.

In 2011, the Federal Communications Commission (FCC), recognized Mosaik Solutions as the "industry standard" for the presence of wireless service at the census-block level.

== History ==
In 2016, Mosaik purchased Sensorly, a free app developed to crowdsource cellular network performance service and provide coverage mapping for wireless networks worldwide.

== Products and services ==
=== MapELEMENTS ===
MapELEMENTS software is a visualization tool that allows users to analyze data from the largest cellular coverage database in the world.

=== CellMaps ===
CellMaps is an interactive mapping solution that allows companies to show their network coverage directly on their website through an iframe or API. In 2013 Mosaik launched an android app for CellMaps that provides data directly from carriers so that users can determine what carrier meets their needs in a given area. On the map you can overlay multiple carriers, zoom to street-view level, and drop a pin onto any given spot to get a breakdown of carrier service in that area.

=== Signal Insights App ===
Signal Insights is an SaaS platform service available for android users that measures and analyzes the customer's experience in cellular or Wi-Fi networks. Indoor mode allows a user to upload a building floor plan and then map and test specific points in the building for cellular or Wi-Fi connectivity.

=== Sensorly App ===
Sensorly is a free app that crowdsources cellular network performance to provide coverage mapping worldwide and mobile speed data to help consumers make informed decisions when choosing a cellular carrier. In February 2017, Sensorly launched Map Trip, a feature that allows users to map their routes and share with others their signal data at a particular point in real time.

=== TowerSource ===
TowerSource is a resource for locating cell towers and identifying ownership, availability, fiber routes, type and height. It was acquired by Mosaik Solutions in September 2014.

=== Network Validator ===
Network Validator is a SaaS solution designed for users to quickly determine whether global cellular networks exist - by country, operator and wireless technology.

=== CoverageRight ===
CoverageRight is composed of licensed GIS file datasets that identify the marketed coverage of wireless operators in the United States and worldwide. It enables users to perform spatial analyses, monitor competitive build-outs, analyze coverage trends and assemble roaming footprints. This data has been utilized by the FCC to analyze wireless coverage nationwide.

=== Network QoE ===
Network QoE is an enterprise platform that uses crowdsourced data from cellular devices to detect wireless network issues including 3G, 4G and wifi accessibility, network coverage holes and data performance issues.

=== Wireless Spectrum Report ===
In March 2017, Mosaik Solutions launched the Wireless Spectrum Report, a tabular dataset detailing facts about spectrum ownership and availability in the United States.
