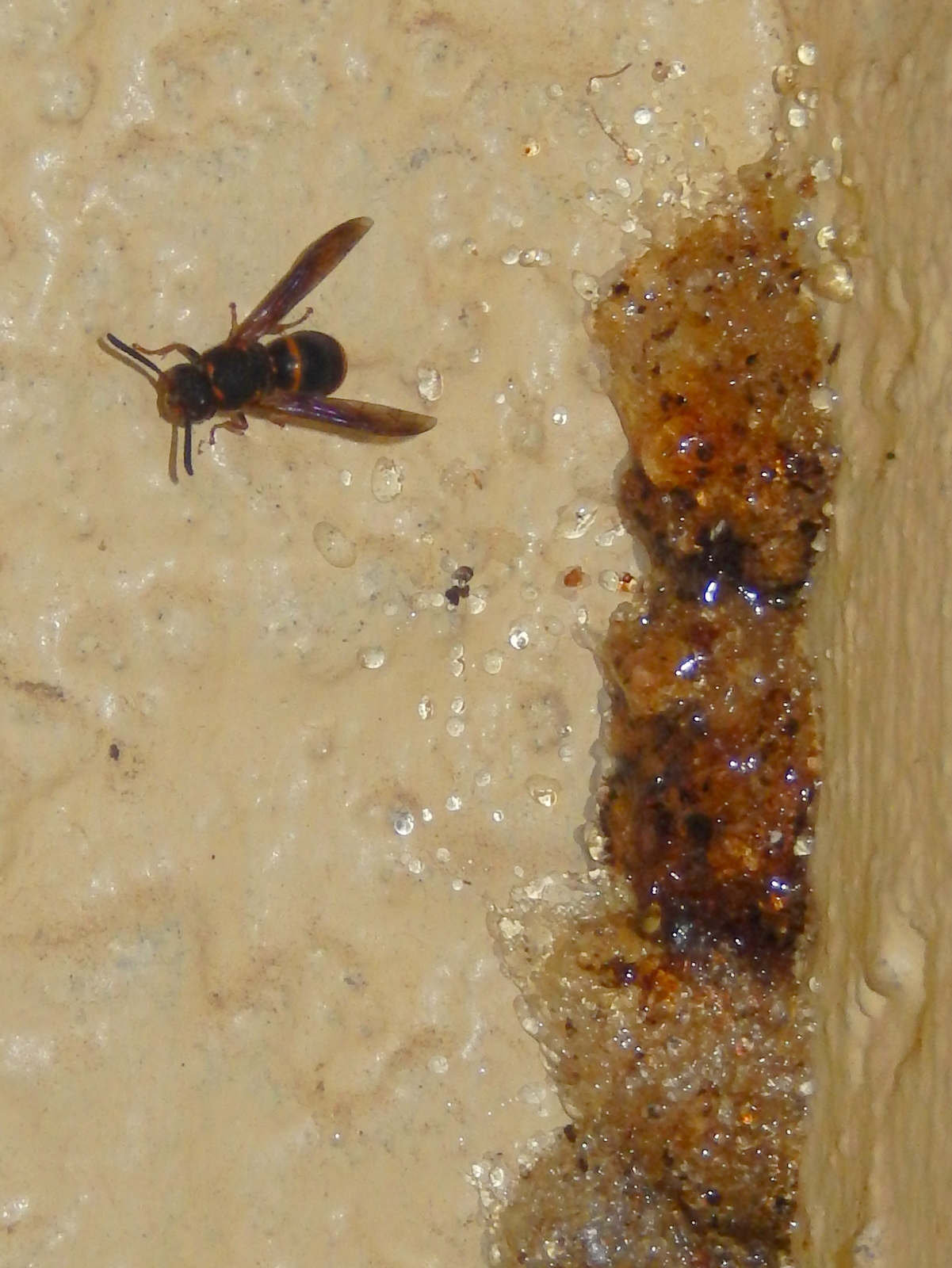

Scientific classification
- Domain: Eukaryota
- Kingdom: Animalia
- Phylum: Arthropoda
- Class: Insecta
- Order: Hymenoptera
- Family: Vespidae
- Subfamily: Eumeninae
- Genus: Epsilon; Saussure, 1855

Species
- See text

= Epsilon (wasp) =

Genus of wasps

Epsilon is an Indomalayan and Australasian genus of potter wasps. It contains the following species:

- Epsilon achterbergi Giordani Soika, 1995
- Epsilon burmanicum (Bingham, 1897)
- Epsilon chartergiforme (Giordani Soika, 1962)
- Epsilon chikmagalurense (Lambert, 2008)
- Epsilon dyscherum (Saussure, 1853)
- Epsilon excavatus (Borsato, 1994)
- Epsilon fujianensis Lee, 1981
- Epsilon grandipunctatum Gusenleitner, 1996
- Epsilon incola Giordani Soika, 1995
- Epsilon laboriosum (Smith, 1864)
- Epsilon manasicum Kumar & Carpenter, 2014
- Epsilon manifestum (Smith, 1858)
- Epsilon rufipes Selis, 2017
- Epsilon similimanasicum Zhang, Chen & Li, 2020
- Epsilon spec (Giordani Soika, 1962)
- Epsilon subfistulosus (Wickwar, 1908)
- Epsilon tinctipenne (Walker, 1860)
- Epsilon vechti Giordani Soika, 1995
