= Idolator (album) =

Studio album by Blood Stain Child
- Released: August 18, 2005
- Genres: Melodic death metal; industrial metal
- Length: 48:46
- Labels: M&I Company; Dockyard1; Locomotive
- Producers: Blood Stain Child, Tue Madsen

Blood Stain Child chronology
Mystic Your Heart (2003)	Idolator (2005)	Mozaiq (2007)

Professional ratings
Review scores
Source	Rating
AllMusic	3.5/5 stars
BW&BK	8/10 stars
Rock Hard	7/10 stars
Metal.de	5/10 stars
Metal Storm	7/10 stars
AncientSpirit	9.5/10 stars
Vampire Magazine	(unfavorable)

Idolator is the third album by the Japanese metal band Blood Stain Child. Idolator combines melodic death metal similar to the In Flames albums released before this album with electronic and industrial metal influences similar to Machinae Supremacy, particularly on "Nuclear Trance". "Embrace Me", has a piano section both at the beginning and at the end of the song. In 2006, the band signed to Dockyard1 and released the album in Europe on November 27, 2006. The album was released in the United States on July 17, 2007.

== Original track listing ==
All tracks are written by Ryu except where noted.

Idolator
No.	Title	Writer(s)	Length
1.	"Hyper Sonic"		4:41
2.	"Live Inside"		3:27
3.	"Embrace Me"		4:56
4.	"Final Sky"		4:03
5.	"Truth"		3:17
6.	"Trial Spiral"		3:48
7.	"Void"		4:21
8.	"Nuclear Trance"		5:06
9.	"Ag2o"		3:40
10.	"Type-N"		3:23
11.	"Life Story"		4:30
12.	"True Blue"	Luna Sea	3:36
Total length:			48:46

== European release track list ==
1. "Hyper Sonic" 4:41
2. "Truth" – 3:17
3. "Final Sky" – 4:03
4. "Live Inside" – 3:27
5. "Ag2o" – 3:40
6. "Embrace Me" – 4:56
7. "Trial Spiral" – 3:48
8. "Void" – 4:21
9. "Type-N" – 3:23
10. "True Blue (Luna Sea cover)" – 3:36

== Personnel ==
- Ryo – lead vocals, bass guitar
- Ryu – lead guitar
- Shiromasa – rhythm guitar
- Aki – keyboards, piano, synthesizers, programming, backing vocals
- Violator – drums

== Release history ==
Region	Release date
Japan	August 18, 2005
Europe	November 27, 2006
United States	July 17, 2007
