= Mozaiq (album) =

Studio album by Blood Stain Child
- Released: 18 July 2007
- Recorded: 2007
- Genre: Melodic death metal; industrial metal
- Length: 46:53
- Label: M&I company Dockyard1; Locomotive; Dope Entertainment
- Producer: Blood Stain Child; Tue Madsen

Blood Stain Child chronology
Idolator (2005)	Mozaiq (2007)	εpsilon (2011)

Professional ratings
Review scores
Source	Rating
Metalstorm	8/10 stars
Metalminder	9.5/10 stars
somethingFM	82/100

Mozaiq (stylized as mozaíq) is the fourth studio album by the metal band, Blood Stain Child. It was released on July 18, 2007, in Japan and was released on 20 July 2007 in Europe. Mozaiq contains 11 tracks plus an extra track that differs; for Japan "Ez Do Dance" a cover after TRF and for Europe "Cosmic Highway".

== Style ==
Mozaiq is more euro-trance influenced than all their previous materials, stating that it "is really about breaking down the boundaries of what we refer to as Heavy Music". It contains more clean vocals, especially on "Neo-Gothic-Romance". The track "Metropolice" is built upon female vocal samples. Instrumentation is lower-paced than on their previous works, especially their debut album, and synths sometimes cross into industrial/Eurodance territory. With the arrival of vocalist Sadew, original lead vocalist Ryo performs only backing vocals on the album in addition to maintaining his role as bassist.

== Track listing ==
No.	Title	Length
1.	"Exotic-6-Cordinator"	3:36
2.	"Cyber Green"	3:20
3.	"Freedom"	4:16
4.	"Energy Blast"	3:47
5.	"Pitch Black Room"	4:15
6.	"Another Dimension"	3:44
7.	"Metropolice"	4:00
8.	"C.E.0079"	4:42
9.	"Innocence"	3:32
10.	"Peacemaker"	3:33
11.	"Neo-Gothic-Romance"	3:57

Japanese Bonus Track
No.	Title	Length
12.	"EZ Do Dance" (TRF cover)	4:00

European and American Bonus Track
No.	Title	Length
12.	"Cosmic Highway"	3:07

Korean Bonus Track
No.	Title	Length
12.	"Nuclear Trance"	5:06

== Videography ==
A video for "Freedom" was shot which can be viewed here on YouTube. The video shows the band playing apparently in the dark at night near an enormous beacon. Towards the end of the video, it brightens up and turns into day.

== Personnel ==
- Sadew − lead vocals
- Ryu − lead guitar, backing vocals
- G.S.R − rhythm guitar
- Ryo − bass guitar, unclean backing vocals
- Aki − keyboards, synthesizers, programming, backing vocals
- Violator − drums, percussion

== Additional musicians ==
- Maripu - Female Vocals

== Release history ==
Region	Release date
Japan	18 July 2007
Europe	20 July 2007
South Korea	3 August 2007
United States	9 October 2007
