= Epsilon (Blood Stain Child album) =

Studio album by Blood Stain Child
- Released: June 15, 2011
- Genre: Melodic death metal; electro-industrial; dance metal
- Length: 45:06 (Europe); 49:20 (Japan)
- Label: Pony Canyon, Coroner Records, Razzia
- Producer: Blood Stain Child, Ettore Rigotti

Blood Stain Child chronology
Mozaiq (2007)	Epsilon (2011)	THE LEGEND (2018)

Epsilon (stylized as εpsilon) is Blood Stain Child's fifth studio album and first release on Coroner Records/Pony Canyon. It's also the first and only album to feature vocalist Sophia and drummer Gami (after the departure of vocalist Sadew and drummer/founding-member Violator). All compositions—except "Electricity," which is composed by Aki—are by Ryu, while lyrics are co-written by Sophia. This album was pre-sold during A-Kon from June 10 to 12, 2011. And, in this event, nine of the new songs (including the European bonus track, "Royal Sky") were performed. As of June 7, 2011, Pony Canyon released forty-four second samples of each song in the album; a full sample of "Sirius VI" debuted, through Internet radio, on May 26, 2011.

== Track listing ==
All lyrics are written by Sophia and Ryu, except where noted; all music is composed by Ryu, except where noted.

No.	Title	Lyrics	Music	Length
1.	"Sirius VI"			4:28
2.	"Forever Free (feat. Disarmonia Mundi)"			3:58
3.	"Stargazer"			4:21
4.	"S.O.P.H.I.A"			2:52
5.	"Unlimited Alchemist"			3:51
6.	"Electricity"	Aki	Aki	3:40
7.	"Eternal"			4:34
8.	"Moon Light Wave"			2:45
9.	"Dedicated to Violator"			3:53
10.	"Merry-Go-Round"			4:35
11.	"La+"			3:19
12.	"Sai-Ka-No"			2:59

Japanese Bonus Track
No.	Title	Lyrics	Length
13.	"Void Dmn-str. Remix"	Ryu	4:20

European Bonus Track
No.	Title	Lyrics	Length
13.	"Royal Sky"	Ryu	4:06

== Personnel ==
Blood Stain Child

- Sophia – clean vocals
- Ryo – unclean vocals, bass guitar
- Ryu – lead guitar
- G.S.R. – rhythm guitar
- Aki – synthesizers, keyboards, programming, backing vocals
- Gami – drums, percussion

Guests

- Claudio Ravinale – screams on "Forever Free" and "S.O.P.H.I.A"
- Ettore Rigotti – vocals on "Forever Free" and "Moon Light Wave", electronic percussion on "Forever Free".

Production

- Produced/Recorded by Blood Stain Child.
- Mixed/Mastered by Ettore Rigotti.
- Illustrated by Mario Wibisono

== Release history ==
Region	Release date
Japan	June 15, 2011
Europe	June 30, 2011
