= Keith Willmott =

British American entomologist and curator

Keith Richard Willmott is a British American entomologist, and curator and former director of the McGuire Center for Lepidoptera and Biodiversity at the Florida Museum of Natural History (FLMNH). His research focuses on butterfly diversity, particularly in the tropical Andes, a region known for its exceptional biodiversity. Willmott is recognized for his contributions to butterfly systematics, conservation, and the discovery of numerous new species.

== Early life and education ==
Willmott grew up in the United Kingdom. At the age of 16, he travelled to Venezuela with his school friend and classmate Jason Hall, where the pair explored rainforests and studied butterflies attracted to bait traps. After Hall moved to Florida to pursue a doctorate under Thomas Emmel, Willmott followed, beginning his doctoral degree in entomology at the University of Florida in 1994. He holds a Bachelor of Science from the University of Cambridge and a Doctor of Philosophy from the University of Florida.

== Research and contributions ==
=== Butterfly diversity and systematics ===
Willmott's primary research focuses on the diversity, distribution, and natural history of butterflies in Ecuador and the Andean region. Collaborating with entomologist Jason Hall and others, he has contributed to the systematic classification of butterflies. He and his colleagues have contributed approximately 15,000 specimens representing 2,000 species to the Florida Museum of Natural History and collaborating collections in the United States and Ecuador. These specimens have also been integral to molecular research.

Willmott has described several new butterfly species and conducted groundbreaking studies on mimicry in clearwing butterflies. His collaborative work on mimicry demonstrated how ecological niches can converge due to mimicry benefits, challenging traditional views on competition-driven coexistence.

=== Euptychiina butterflies ===
Willmott's work with an international team of researchers on the butterfly subtribe Euptychiina, historically poorly studied, revised the group's classification. By analyzing over 60,000 specimens and employing DNA analysis, this team has identified more than 100 unnamed species, significantly enhancing the understanding of their diversity.

=== Tropical Andean Butterfly Diversity Project ===
Willmott helped lead the Tropical Andean Butterfly Diversity project, funded by the UK's Darwin Initiative. This collaboration identified priority areas for research and conservation, inspired plans for long-term study sites, and provided opportunities for local students. The project's findings have informed strategies to conserve Andean butterflies and their habitats.

=== Notable discoveries ===
Keith Willmott has discovered and/or helped describe more than 200 new taxa of butterflies, including Tithorea pacifica, Methona grandior batesi, Scada reckia ruiza, Hyalyris yasunina, Hyalyris praxilla leuca, Napeogenes garwoodae, Pachacutia, Pachacutia baroni, Megeuptychia monopunctata, Nhambikuara toynei, Myselasia mapatayna, Myselasia nauca, Pelolasia nytua, among others, mostly in collaboration with Jason Hall.

=== Editorial and professional roles ===
Willmott serves as editor of Tropical Lepidoptera Research and as one of the directors of the Association for Tropical Lepidoptera.

== Selected publications ==
- Janzen, D.H.; Hallwachs, W.; Blandin, P.; Burns, J.M.; CADIOU, J.M.; Chacon, I.; Dapkey, T.; Deans, A.R.; Epstein, M.E.; Espinoza, B.; Franclemont, J.G. (2009). "Integration of DNA barcoding into an ongoing inventory of complex tropical biodiversity" (PDF). Molecular Ecology Resources. 9: 1–26. doi:10.1111/j.1755-0998.2009.02628.x. PMID 21564960.
- Mallet, J.; Willmott, K. (2003). "Taxonomy: renaissance or Tower of Babel?". Trends in Ecology & Evolution. 18 (2): 57–59. doi:10.1016/S0169-5347(02)00061-7.
- Elias, M.; Hill, R.I.; Willmott, K.R.; Dasmahapatra, K.K.; Brower, A.V.; Mallet, J.; Jiggins, C.D. (2007). "Limited performance of DNA barcoding in a diverse community of tropical butterflies". Proceedings of the Royal Society B: Biological Sciences. 274 (1627): 2881–2889. doi:10.1098/rspb.2007.1035. PMC 3227132. PMID 17785265.
- Espeland, M.; Breinholt, J.; Willmott, K.R.; Warren, A.D.; Vila, R.; Toussaint, E.F.; Maunsell, S.C.; Aduse-Poku, K.; Talavera, G.; Eastwood, R.; Jarzyna, M.A. (2018). "A comprehensive and dated phylogenomic analysis of butterflies". Current Biology. 28 (5): 770–778. Bibcode:2018CBio...28E.770E. doi:10.1016/j.cub.2018.01.061. hdl:10072/384394. PMID 29456146.
- Elias, M.J.B.P.; Joron, M.; Willmott, K.; Silva-Brandão, K.L.; Kaiser, V.; Arias, C.F.; Piñerez, L.G.; Uribe, S.; Brower, A.V.Z.; Freitas, A.V.L.; Jiggins, C.D. (2009). "Out of the Andes: patterns of diversification in clearwing butterflies". Molecular Ecology. 18 (8): 1716–1729. Bibcode:2009MolEc..18.1716E. doi:10.1111/j.1365-294X.2009.04149.x. PMID 19386035.
- Elias, M.; Gompert, Z.; Jiggins, C.; Willmott, K. (2008). "Mutualistic interactions drive ecological niche convergence in a diverse butterfly community". PLOS Biology. 6 (12): 2642–2649. doi:10.1371/journal.pbio.0060300. PMC 2592358. PMID 19055316.
- Willmott, K.R.; Freitas, A.V. (2006). "Higher-level phylogeny of the Ithomiinae (Lepidoptera: Nymphalidae): classification, patterns of larval hostplant colonization and diversification". Cladistics. 22 (4): 297–368. doi:10.1111/j.1096-0031.2006.00108.x. PMID 34892866.
- Willmott, K.R. (2003). The genus Adelpha: its systematics, biology and biogeography. Gainesville, FL: Scientific Publishers.
- Hall, J.P.; Willmott, K.R. (2000). "Patterns of feeding behaviour in adult male riodinid butterflies and their relationship to morphology and ecology". Biological Journal of the Linnean Society. 69 (1): 1–23. doi:10.1111/j.1095-8312.2000.tb01666.x.
- Rosser, N.; Phillimore, A.B.; Huertas, B.; Willmott, K.R.; Mallet, J. (2012). "Testing historical explanations for gradients in species richness in heliconiine butterflies of tropical America". Biological Journal of the Linnean Society. 105 (3): 479–497. doi:10.1111/j.1095-8312.2011.01814.x.
- Checa, M.F.; Rodriguez, J.; Willmott, K.R.; Liger, B. (2014). "Microclimate variability significantly affects the composition, abundance and phenology of butterfly communities in a highly threatened neotropical dry forest". Florida Entomologist. 97 (1): 1–13. doi:10.1653/024.097.0101.
