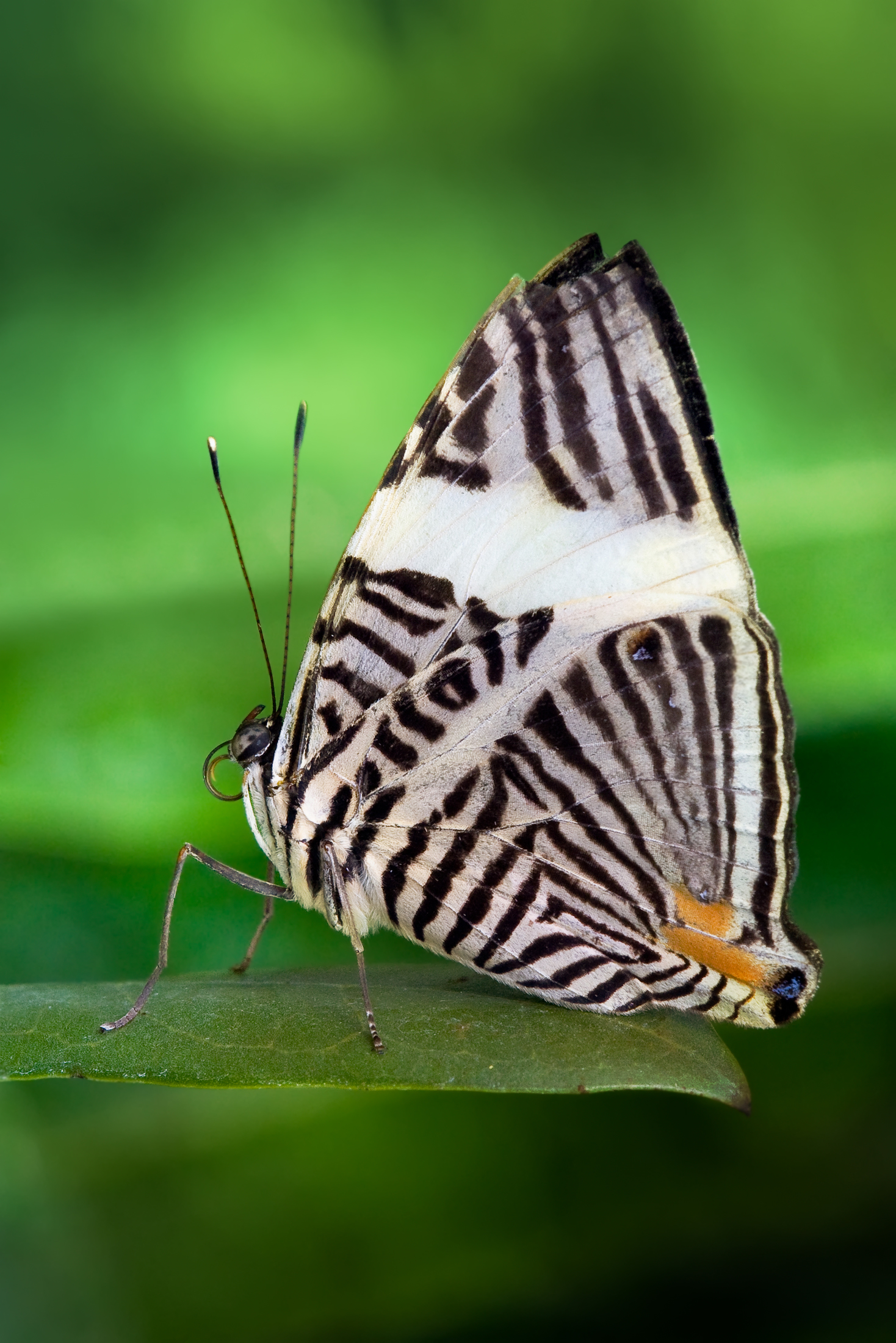

Scientific classification
- Kingdom: Animalia
- Phylum: Arthropoda
- Class: Insecta
- Order: Lepidoptera
- Family: Nymphalidae
- Genus: Colobura
- Species: C. dirce

Binomial name
- Colobura dirce (Linnaeus, 1758)
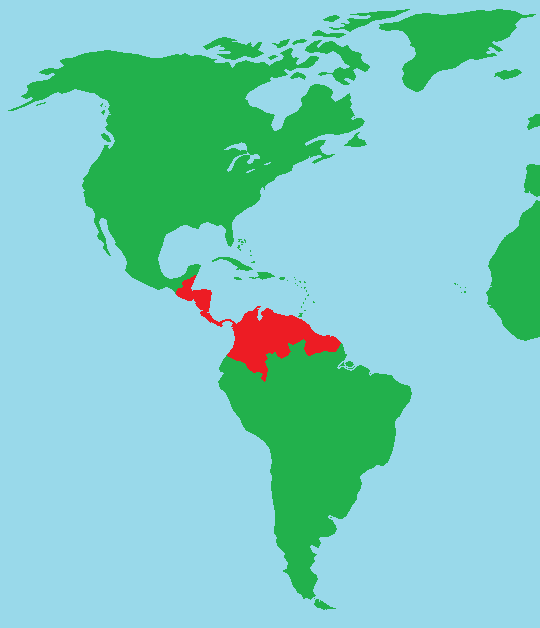
- Approximate range of the Dirce beauty note: Caribbean sightings missing

Synonyms
- Papilio dirce

= Colobura dirce =

Zebra mosaic

Species of butterfly

Colobura dirce, the mosaic or zebra mosaic, is a butterfly of the family Nymphalidae. It is found in Central America. the Caribbean, and northern South America.

The length of the forewings is about 33 mm.

The larvae feed on Cecropia species.

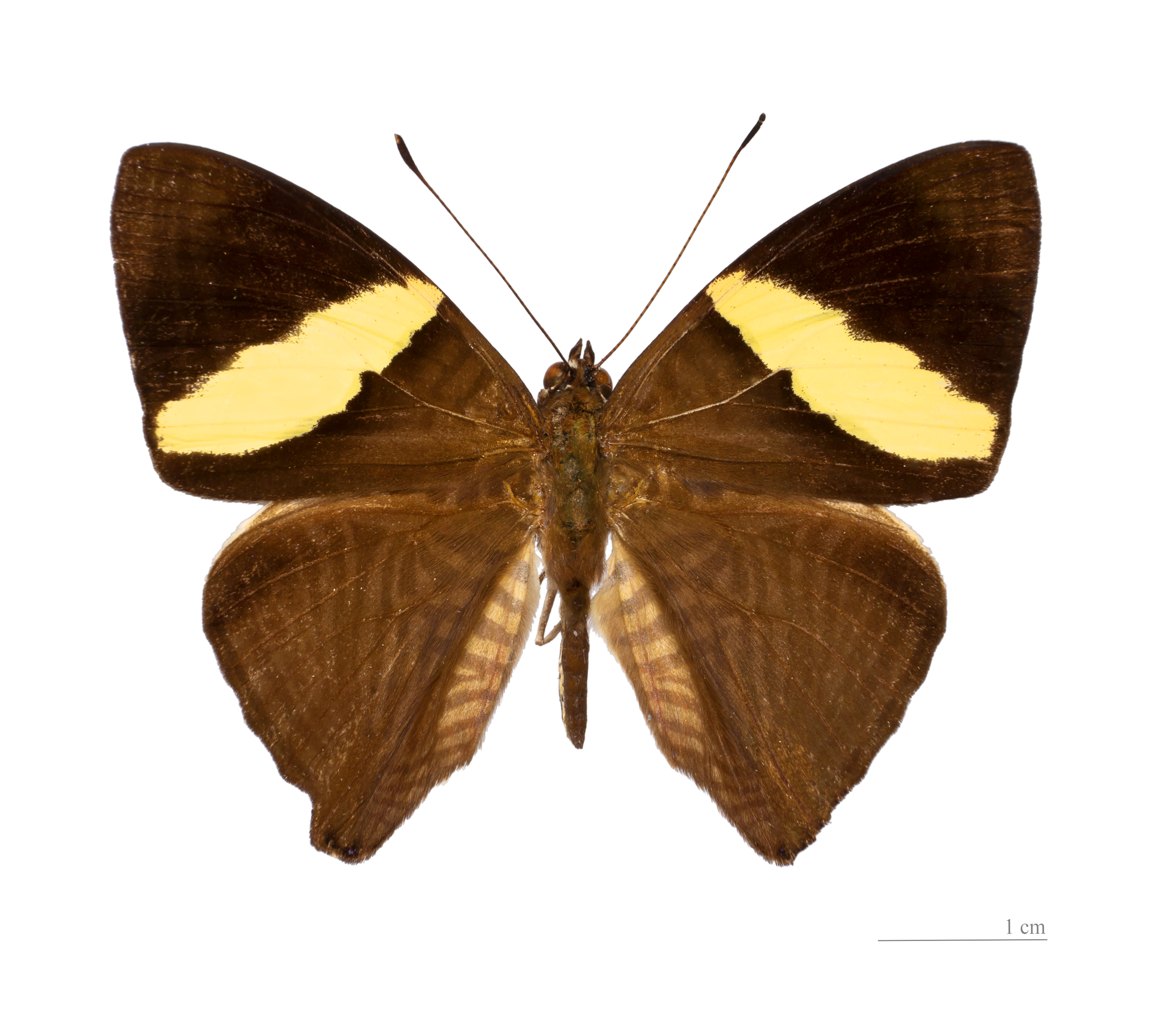
Male, topside, MHNT

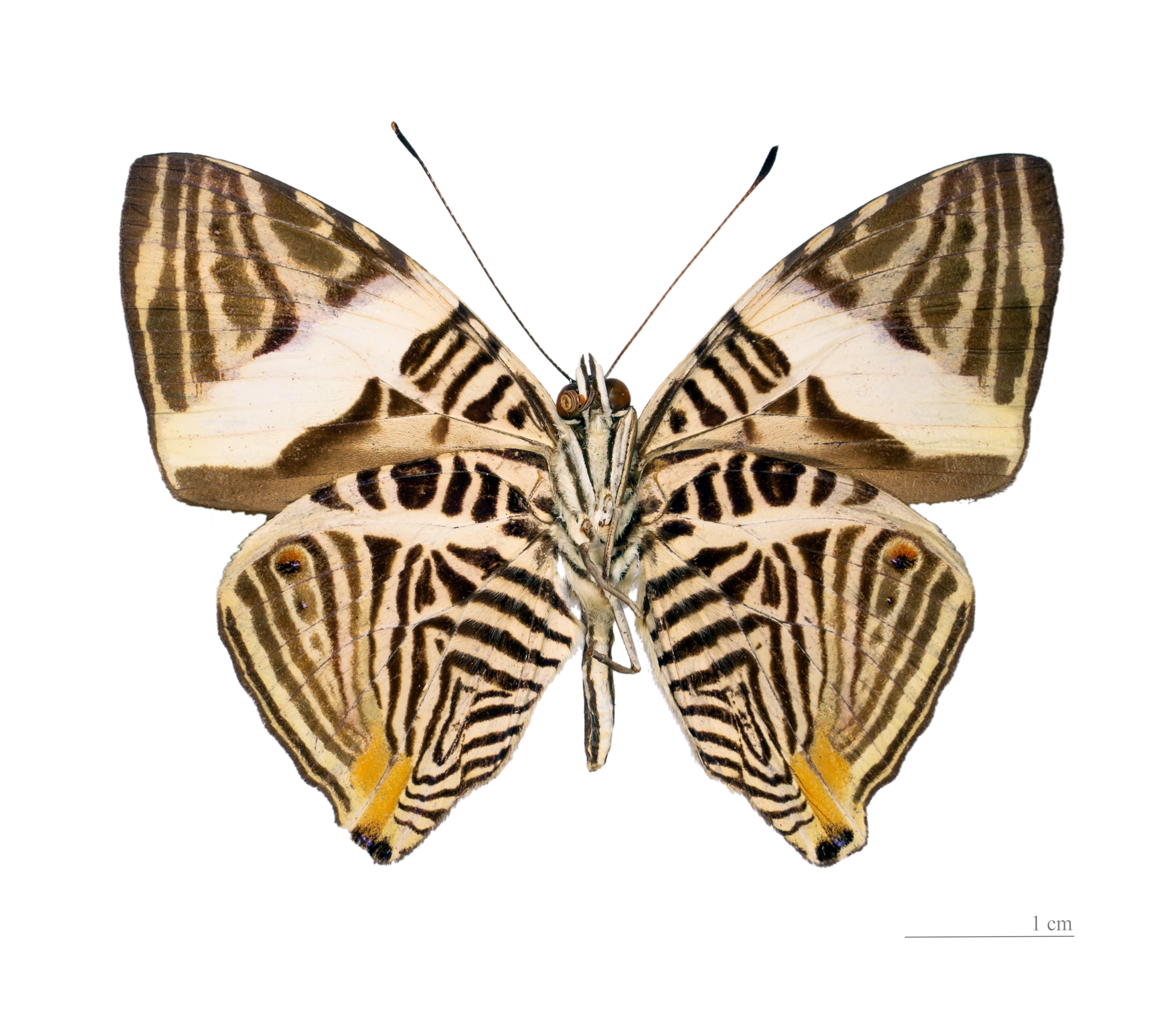
Male, underside, MHNT

== Subspecies ==
There are two recognised subspecies:

- C. d. dirce (Linnaeus, 1758)
- C. d. wolcotti Comstock, 1942
