= Baby, the Stars Shine Bright (brand) =

Japanese clothing brand

- Company type: Corporation
- Genre: Lolita fashion
- Founded: 1988
- Founder: Akinori Isobe; Fumiyo Isobe
- Headquarters: Shibuya, Tokyo, Japan
- Area served: Asia, Europe, North America
- Products: Apparel, accessories
- Website: www.babyssb.co.jp

Baby, the Stars Shine Bright (株式会社 ベイビー、ザ スターズ シャイン ブライト, Kabushiki Kaisha Beibī, Za Sutāzu Shain Buraito) is a Japanese apparel brand created in 1988 by Akinori and Fumiyo Isobe. The brand specializes in lolita fashion and has been widely known for its "sweet" aesthetic. In 2004, Baby, the Stars Shine Bright launched Alice and the Pirates, a sub-brand centered on gothic and punk lolita apparel.

== Brand concept ==
Gothic & Lolita Bible describes Baby, the Stars Shine Bright's designs as being "dominated by ribbons, lace, and flowers" that emphasize the wearer's youthfulness and sweetness. The brand is one of the widely known brands in lolita fashion for its "sweet lolita" aesthetic, which features "pastels" and "cupcake" silhouettes. The brand is named after the 1986 album of the same name by British duo Everything but the Girl.

== History ==
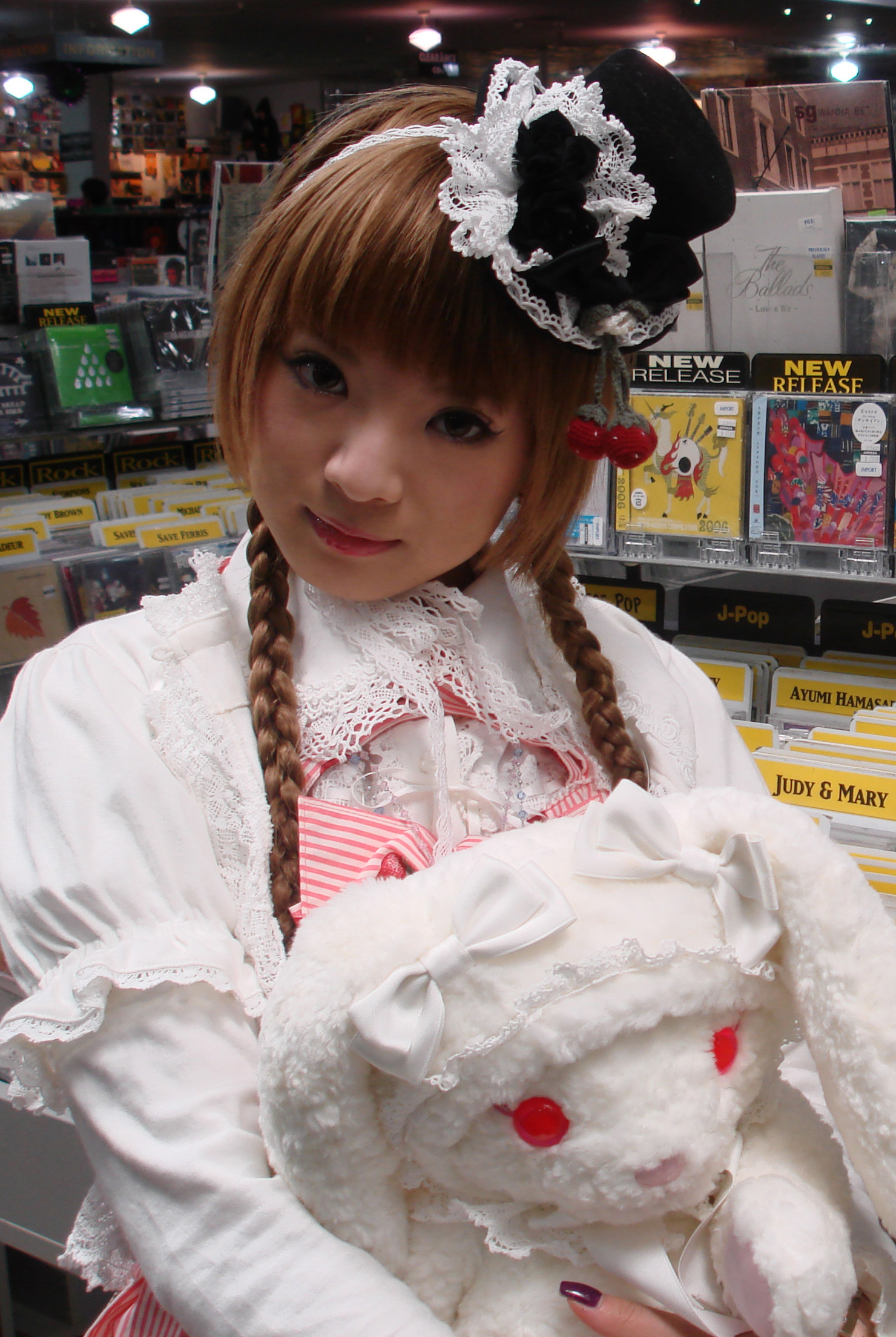
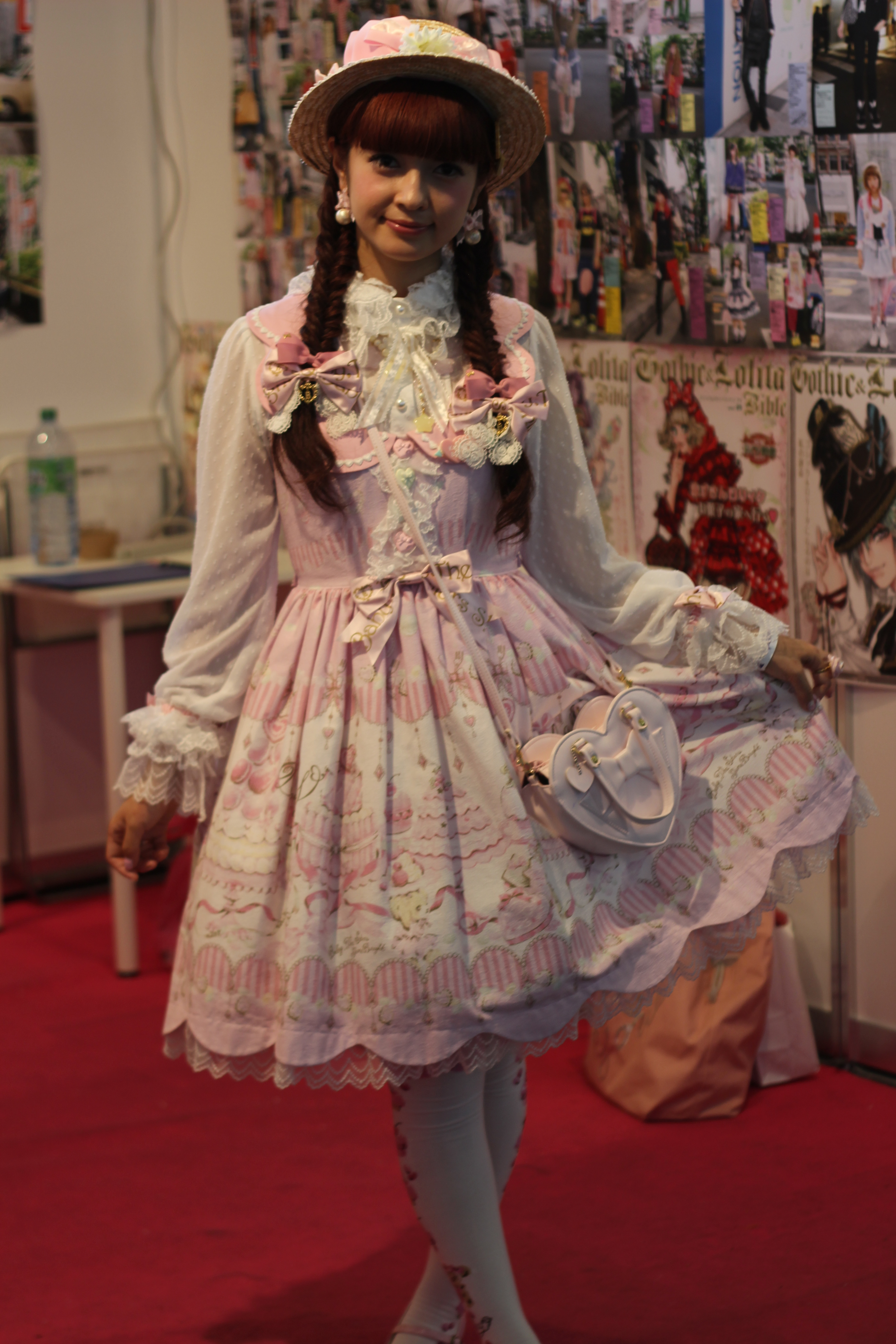
Nana Kitade (pictured in 2006) and Misako Aoki (pictured in 2014) wearing clothing from Baby, the Stars Shine Bright

Baby, the Stars Shine Bright was founded in Japan by Akinori and Fumiyo Isobe, a married couple. They first opened a store in Shibuya in 1988. The company's flagship store, opened in 1999 in Daikanyamachō, Shibuya, was relocated to Omotesandō in 2012.

Baby, the Stars Shine Bright became more widely known after the release of the 2004 live-action film adaptation of Novala Takemoto's 2002 novel Kamikaze Girls, of which they were featured in the film and produced the wardrobe for one of the main characters.

By February 2008, Baby, the Stars Shine Bright had an English version of their website and allowed people outside of Japan to purchase their clothing. In August 2009, Baby, the Stars Shine Bright opened its first store in the United States in San Francisco, California. In July 2014, Baby, the Stars Shine Bright opened a store in New York City, New York, as part of a combination store with Japanese alternative fashion retailer Tokyo Rebel. The New York store closed on February 28, 2018. A location was also opened in Paris, France, but it closed on April 13, 2017.

== Products ==
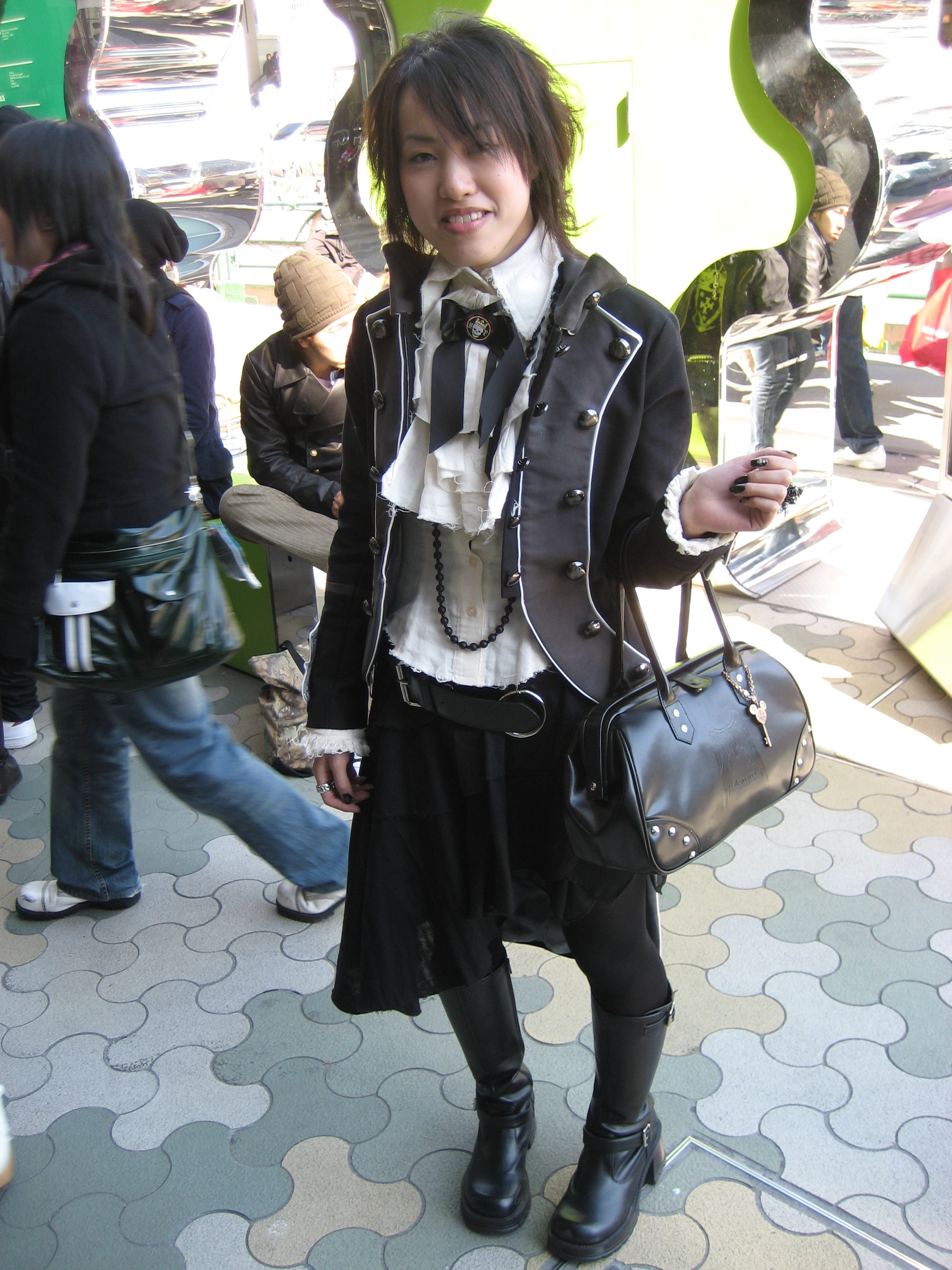
A person wearing clothing from Alice and the Pirates in 2007

Baby, the Stars Shine Bright sells apparel that is handstitched in Japan and cut from custom fabrics. In May 2023, Baby, the Stars Shine Bright released their first fragrance, Baby Princess.

=== Alice and the Pirates ===
In 2004, Baby, the Stars Shine Bright launched Alice and the Pirates, a sub-brand dedicated to gothic and punk styles. The name is inspired by Alice in Wonderland and Vivienne Westwood's 1981 Pirate Collection. Mai Takita was hired as the brand's designer in 2006. The first Alice and the Pirates store launched in Harajuku, Japan, on August 25, 2007.
