= Gothic Lolita =

Fashion subculture

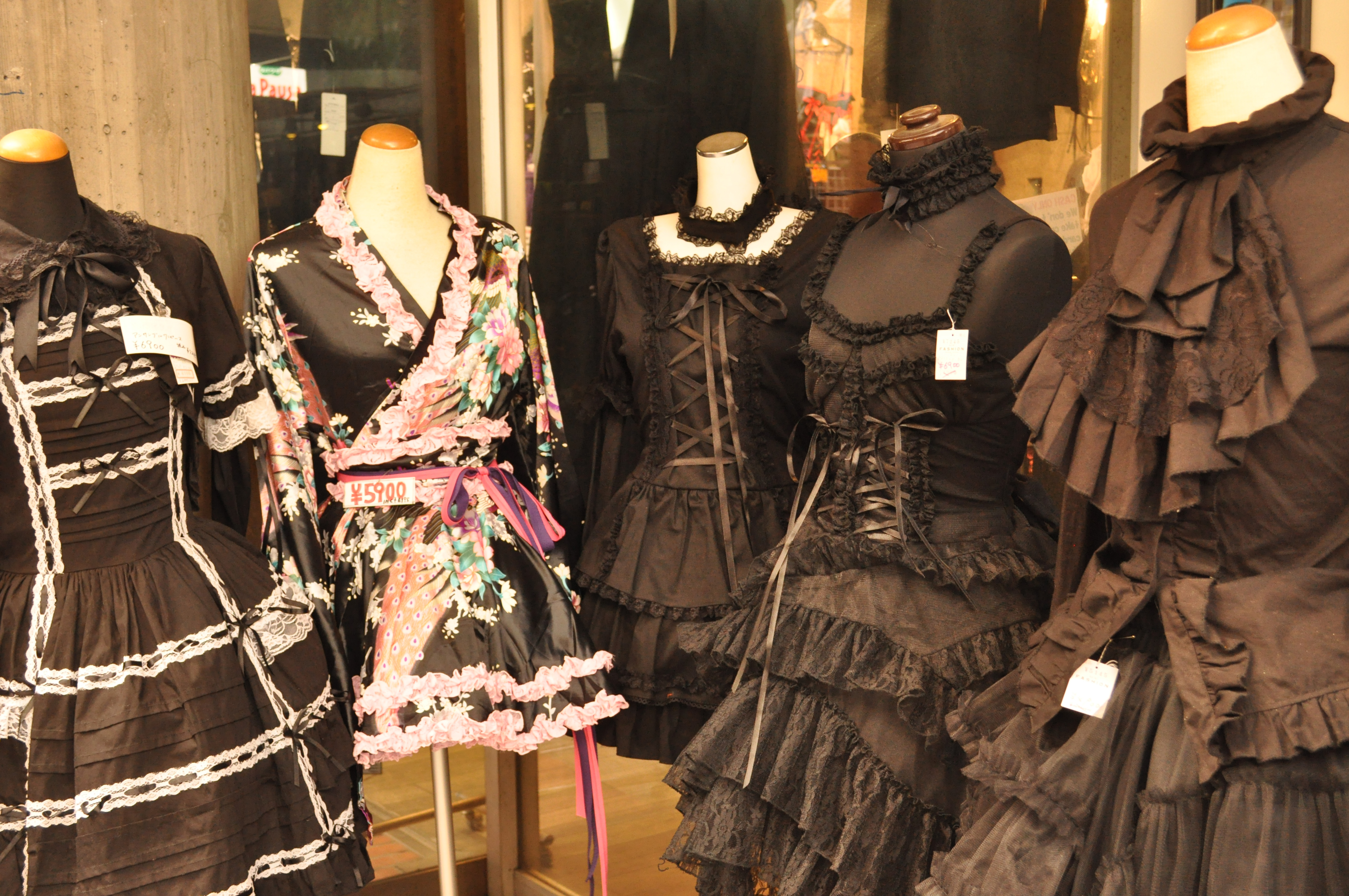
Gothic Lolita

Gothic Lolita (Japanese: ゴシック・アンド・ロリータ, Hepburn: Goshikku ando rorīta), abbreviated as gothloli (ゴスロリ, gosurori), is a Japanese fashion subculture inspired by European goth subculture and is a branch of Japanese Lolita fashion. It was originally based on traditional European clothing and then adopted by the Japanese street culture in the 1980s. Gothic Lolita combines the loveliness of Lolita fashion and the darkness and mystery of the gothic style and is renowned for its abundant use of black elements such as lace, ruffles, and straps.

== Origins and influences ==
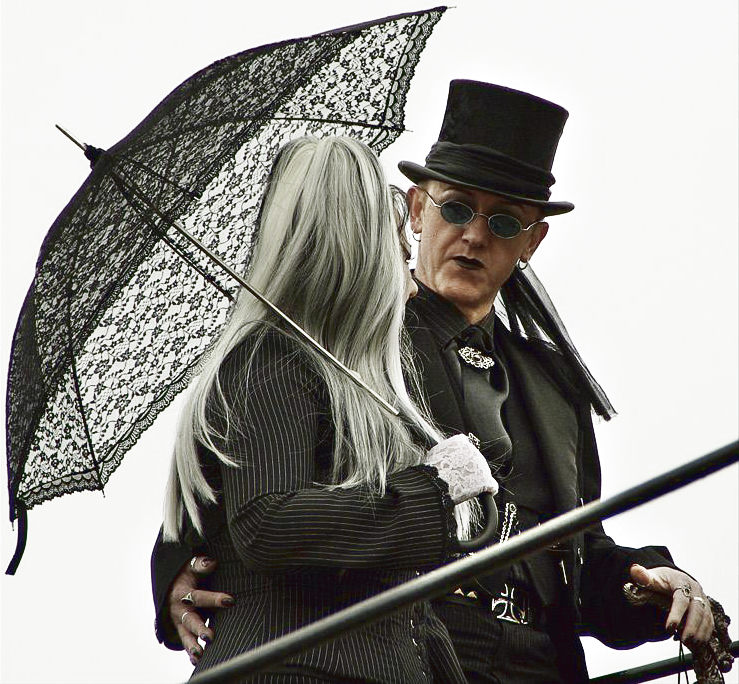
A Goth Couple

Gothic Lolita is generally understood as a substyle of Lolita fashion that combines the silhouette and modesty associated with Lolita dress with darker visual motifs drawn from Gothic aesthetics. Its clothing has often been linked to elements of eighteenth-century Rococo dress and nineteenth-century Victorian clothing, particularly in its use of structured bodices, knee-length or longer skirts, lace, and an emphasis on decorative formality. More broadly, scholarship on Japanese fashion has described street styles such as Lolita fashion as reinterpretations of Western historical dress rather than direct reproductions of it.

In addition to historical dress, Gothic Lolita also draws on visual conventions associated with Gothic art and architecture, including religious imagery, dark colour palettes, stained-glass motifs, crosses, roses, and a general atmosphere of melancholy and theatricality. These elements are not usually employed in historically accurate ways, but are instead reworked into a stylised fashion language within Japanese popular culture. Scholars have therefore described Gothic Lolita as a hybrid form shaped by both European visual history and Japanese subcultural aesthetics.

Moi-meme-Moitie logo

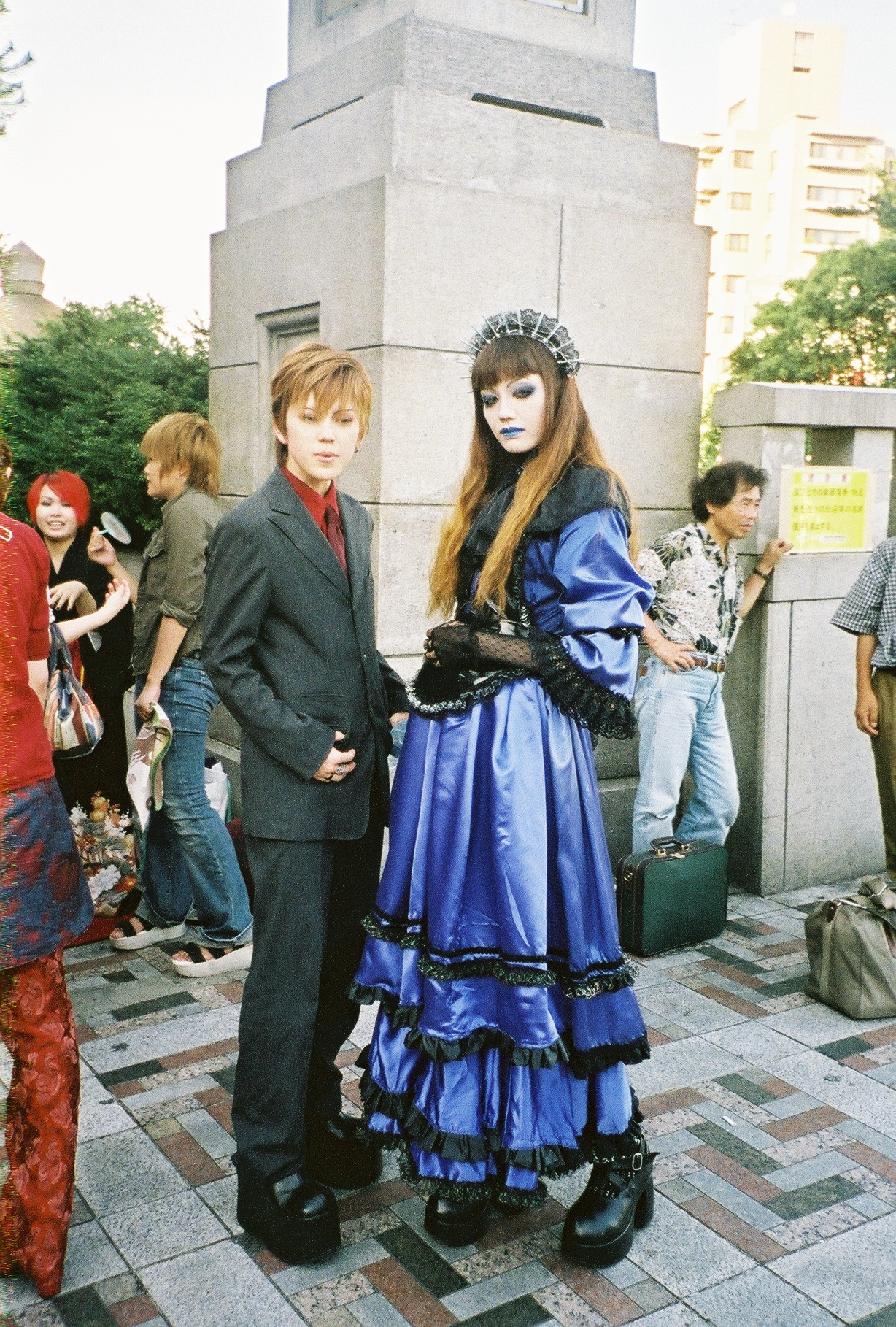
A Malice Mizer cosplayer (right) in Harajuku

== Development ==
During the 1970s, the fashion trend of kawaii spread across Japan, which pushed people to pursue nostalgia and childhood innocence. Therefore, under this business opportunity, a group of the most classic Lolita brands launched their products. In the 1980s, the fans of some Japanese bands named trance gals and nagomu gals wore light make-up and black clothes with skull accessories or striped knee-high socks, ribbons, and gorgeous T-shirts. They gradually incorporated elements of both styles into the same outfit, leading to a new trend in fashion combinations of sweet Lolita.

In the 1990s, with the promotion of bands like Malice Mizer, the Lolita fashion became increasingly established within the Harajuku subculture. More and more brands began to emerge. A member of Malice Mizer, Mana, founded his own fashion brand Moi-même-Moitié, in 1999, thereby promoting this style. This brand remains a cornerstone of the gothic subculture to this day. The name Moi-même-Moitié is formed by combining the French words "Moi-même" (meaning "myself") and "Moitié" (meaning "half"). The slogan of this brand is "Elegant Gothic Girl, Noble Vampire Romance", and it is known for its use of blue (Mana's favorite color), as well as black and white. In fact, there is even a specific term called "Moitié blue", which refers to the particular blue shade that the brand frequently uses.

== Culture and identity ==
Gothic Lolita has been discussed not only as a fashion style but also as a form of identity construction. Researchers have described it as a way for wearers to create a distinct social and visual self through clothing, posture, ornamentation, and performance. In this interpretation, the style functions as more than aesthetic preference, serving instead as a means of negotiating femininity, visibility, and personal autonomy.

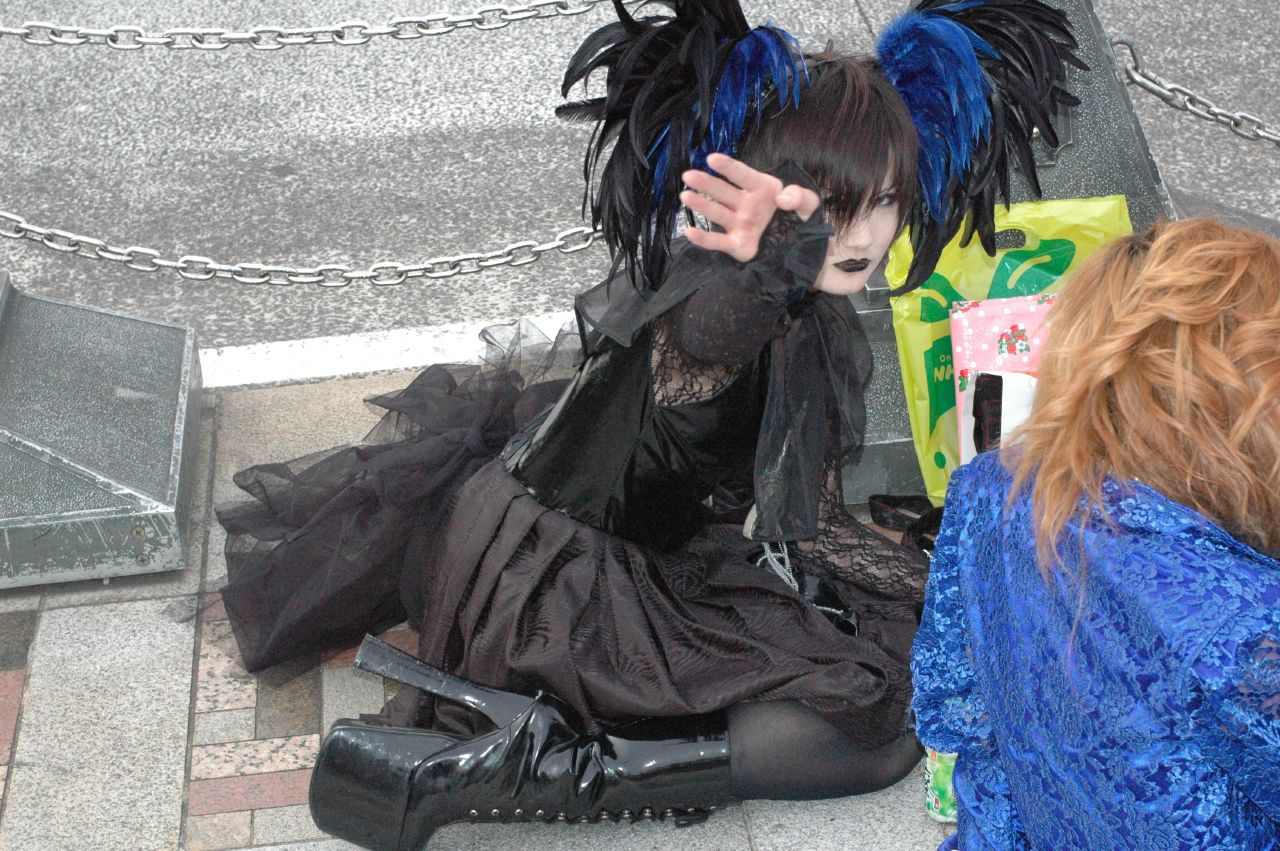
Gothic Lolita in Harajuku

Some commentators and participants have characterised Lolita fashion as a form of protection or self-definition. The musician in Ali Project’s, Arika Takarano famously described such clothing as a kind of “armor,” a phrase that has often been used in later discussions of Lolita and Gothic Lolita. This idea has been linked to the style’s emphasis on modesty and controlled presentation, especially in contrast to forms of fashion that foreground bodily display. In this sense, Gothic Lolita has often been interpreted as a response to the sexualisation of women’s bodies in mainstream culture.

People have also distinguished Gothic Lolita from adjacent practices such as cosplay. While cosplay is generally understood as the performance of a specific fictional character, Gothic Lolita is more often described by participants as an everyday or semi-everyday style connected to self-expression. Online communities have played a major role in defining and circulating these distinctions, particularly through blogs, forums, LiveJournal, Facebook, and later Instagram, where transnational communities helped stabilise shared norms of dress and presentation.

== Style elements ==
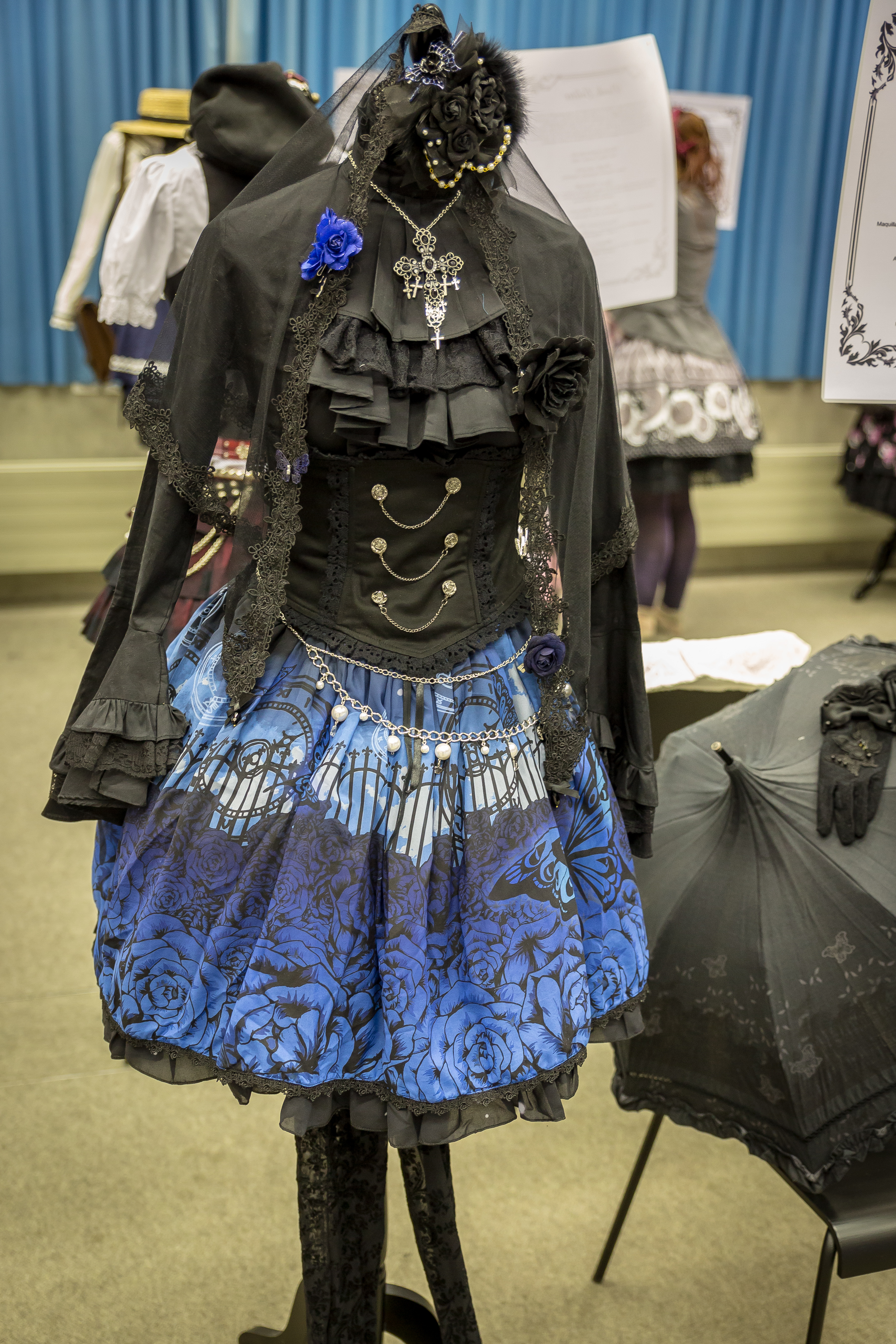
Stands and items of Gothic Lolita

The most recognisable feature of Gothic Lolita is its silhouette. Typical outfits include a fitted bodice or blouse paired with a bell-shaped or A-line skirt supported by a petticoat. Skirt lengths usually fall around the knee or below, maintaining the modest silhouette associated with Lolita fashion as a whole.

Common decorative elements include lace, ribbons, corset-like detailing, ruffles, roses, and religious or Gothic motifs such as crosses, chandeliers, bats, coffins, stained-glass windows, and thorn imagery. Compared with Sweet Lolita, Gothic Lolita generally employs darker materials and a more restrained but dramatic ornamental style. Black is the dominant colour, often combined with white, deep red, navy, purple, and other jewel tones. Moi-même-Moitié in particular became associated with a distinctive dark blue often referred to as “Moitié blue.”

Make-up and accessories also contribute to the overall effect. Pale foundation, dark eyeliner, false eyelashes, and deep red or purple lipstick are often used to create a doll-like or theatrical appearance, although these are not universal requirements. Common accessories include headdresses, gloves, stockings, platform or heeled shoes, parasols, and jewellery featuring crosses or roses.

== Representation in media ==
Gothic Lolita has been widely represented in print and visual media. One of the most influential publications associated with the style was the magazine Gothic & Lolita Bible, first published in 2001. The magazine featured brand advertisements, street snaps, styling guides, sewing patterns, and make-up tutorials, and played a major role in codifying and popularising the style.

Elements associated with Gothic Lolita aesthetics have also appeared in anime, manga, games, and multimedia music franchises. Certain fictional characters are depicted in black lace dresses, layered skirts, parasols, and Victorian-inspired ornamentation that visually overlap with motifs commonly associated with Gothic Lolita.

Similar visual language has also appeared in multimedia music projects such as BanG Dream!, in which the fictional band Roselia employs dark, elaborate stage costumes that echo Gothic-inspired fashion while adapting it to animation and live performance conventions. Such examples illustrate how Gothic-inspired visual motifs circulate beyond street fashion into broader popular media.

== Variants and extensions ==
More theatrical and extreme variants of Gothic Lolita have also appeared in media and subcultural representation. One example is Guro-Loli (“grotesque Lolita”), which combines Lolita dress with horror-inspired elements such as bandages, artificial blood, and imagery of injury. Such forms are generally more associated with stylised visual representation than with everyday wear, but they demonstrate how Gothic Lolita’s aesthetic has been adapted and expanded in different contexts.

== See also ==
- Lolita fashion – Japanese fashion style
- Classic Lolita – Fashion subculture
- Visual kei – Category of Japanese musicians
- Japanese street fashion – Contemporary Japanese fashion trends
- Harajuku – District in Shibuya, Tokyo, Japan
- Kawaii – Japanese cultural phenomenon
- Mana (Japanese musician) – Japanese musician, record producer and fashion designer
