= Lolita fashion =

Fashion subculture originating in Japan

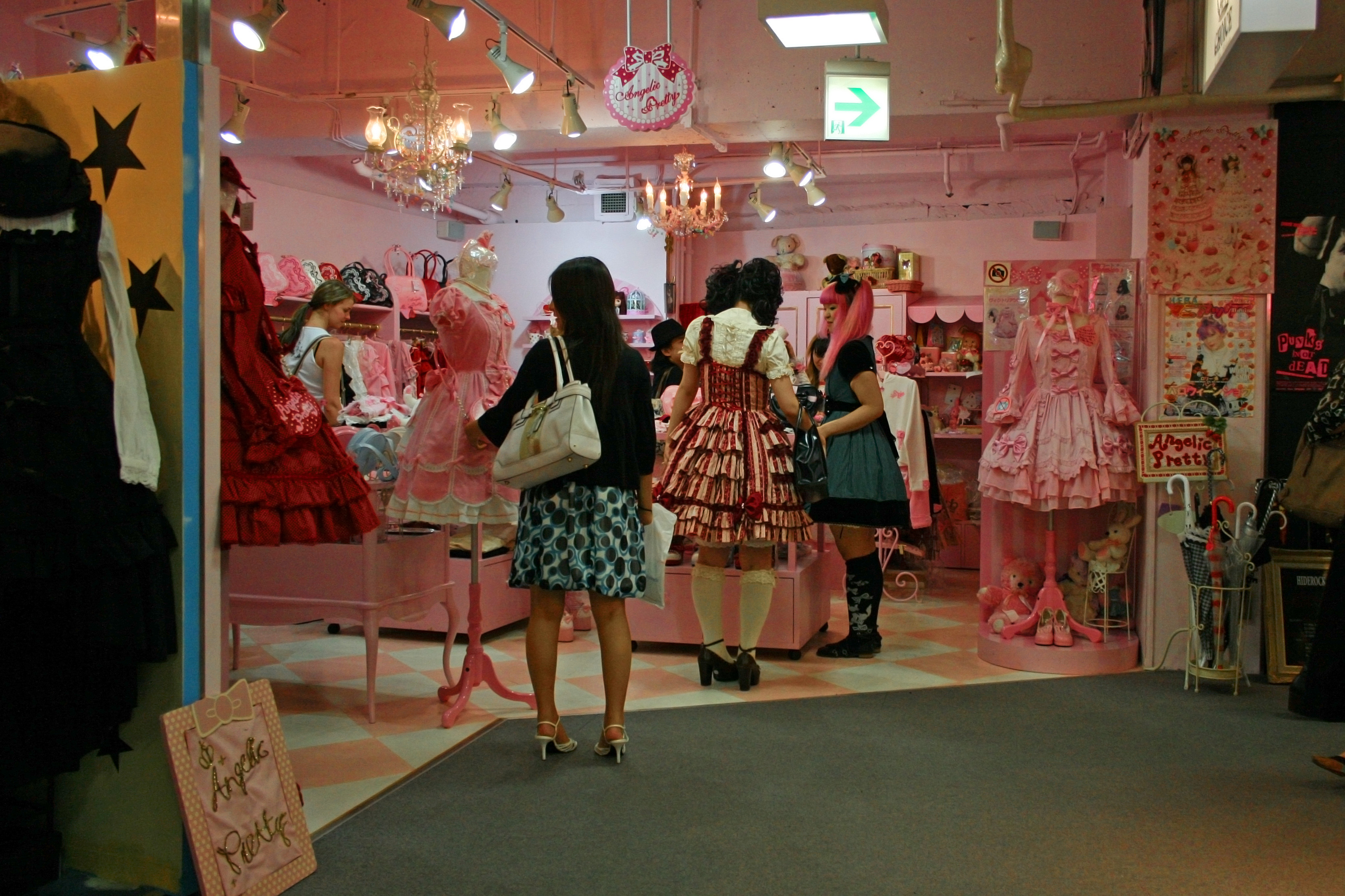
Angelic Pretty, a shop specializing in Lolita fashion

Lolita fashion (ロリータ・ファッション, rorīta fasshon) is a fashion style from Japan that is highly influenced by Victorian clothing and styles from the Rococo period. A distinctive property of Lolita fashion is the aesthetic of cuteness. This clothing subculture can be categorized into three main substyles: gothic, classic, and sweet. Many other substyles such as sailor, country, hime (princess), guro (grotesque), qi and wa (based on traditional Chinese and Japanese dress, respectively), punk, shiro (white), kuro (black), aristocrat, and steampunk Lolita also exist. This style evolved into a widely followed subculture in Japan and other countries in the 1990s and 2000s, although its popularity has waned in Japan as of the 2010s as alternative fashions fell in popularity.

== Description ==
The main feature of Lolita fashion is the silhouette of the skirt, created by wearing a petticoat or crinoline. Skirts can be either bell-shaped or A-line shaped. Components of the Lolita wardrobe consist most importantly of a blouse (long or short sleeves) with a skirt or a dress, such as a jumperskirt (JSK), or a one-piece (OP), which usually come to the knees. The hime cut is popular amongst Lolitas, often paired other headwear such as hair bows or bonnets (similar to poke bonnets). Some Lolitas wear Victorian style bloomers underneath their petticoats, although these are not required. Additionally, some Lolitas wear patterned under the knee (UTK) socks, over the knee (OTK) socks, ankle socks, or tights together with either high heels or decorated, flat shoes (often known as tea party shoes).

== History ==
Although the origin of the fashion is unclear, at the end of the 1970s a new movement known as Otome (乙女) was founded, which slightly influenced Lolita fashion since Otome means maiden and maiden style looks like a less elaborated Lolita style. Before Otome-kei emerged, there was already a rise of cuteness culture in the earlier seventies; during this period there was a strong emphasis on cute and childish handwriting in Japanese schools. As a result, the company Sanrio began experimenting with cute designs. The cuteness style, known as kawaii style, became popular in the 1980s. After Otome Do-It-Yourself became popular, which led to the emergence of a new style called 'dolly-kei', the predecessor of Lolita fashion.

Between 1977 and 1998, a large part of the Harajuku shopping district closed for car traffic on Sundays. The result was an increase in interaction between pedestrians in Harajuku. When brands like PINK HOUSE (1973), Milk (1970), and Angelic Pretty (1979) began to sell cute clothing, it resulted in the emergence of a new style that would later become known as 'Lolita'.

The term 'Lolita' first appeared in the fashion magazine Ryukou Tsushin in the September 1987 issue. Shortly after that, Baby, The Stars Shine Bright (1988), Metamorphose temps de fille (1993), and other brands emerged. In the 1990s, Lolita became more accepted, with visual kei bands like Malice Mizer and others rising in popularity. These band members wore elaborate clothes that fans began to adopt. During this time Japan went through an economic depression, leading to an increase in alternative youth and fashion cultures such as gyaru, otaku, visual kei, and Lolita, as well as visual-kei-inspired clothing such as Mori, Fairy Kei, and Decora. The Lolita style spread quickly from the Kansai region and finally reached Tokyo. Partly due to the economic difficulties, there was large growth in the cuteness and youth cultures that originated in the seventies.

In the late nineties, the Jingu Bashi (also called the Harajuku Bridge) became known as a meeting place for youth who wore Lolita and other alternative fashion, and Lolita became more popular, causing a surge in warehouses selling Lolita fashion. Important magazines that contributed to the spread of the fashion style were the Gothic & Lolita Bible (2001), a spin-off of the popular Japanese fashion magazine KERA (1998), and FRUiTS (1997). It was around this time that interest in and awareness of Lolita fashion began entering countries outside of Japan, with the Gothic & Lolita Bible being translated into English and distributed outside of Japan through the publisher Tokyopop, and FRUiTS publishing an English picture book of Japanese Street Fashion in 2001. As the style became further popularized through the Internet, more shops opened abroad, such as Baby, The Stars Shine Bright in Paris (2007) and in New York (2014).

Over time, the youth that gathered in Harajuku or at Harajuku Bridge disappeared. One possible explanation is that the introduction of fast fashion from retailers H&M and Forever 21 caused a reduction in the consumption of street fashion. FRUiTS ceased publication while the Gothic & Lolita Bible was put on hiatus in 2017. As of May 2023, FRUiTS has been brought back as an ePublication with an English-language version.

== Sources of inspiration ==
European culture has influenced Lolita fashion. The book Alice in Wonderland (1865), written by Lewis Carroll, has inspired many different brands and magazines, such as Alice Deco. The reason that the character Alice was a source of inspiration for Lolita fashion is that she was an ideal icon for the Shōjo (shoujo)-image, meaning an image of eternal innocence and beauty. The first complete translation of the book was published by Maruyama Eikon in 1910, translated under the title Ai-chan No Yume Monogatari (Fantastic stories of Ai). Another figure from Rococo that served as a source of inspiration was Marie Antoinette; the manga The Rose of Versailles (Lady Oscar), based on her court, was created in 1979.

== Popularization ==
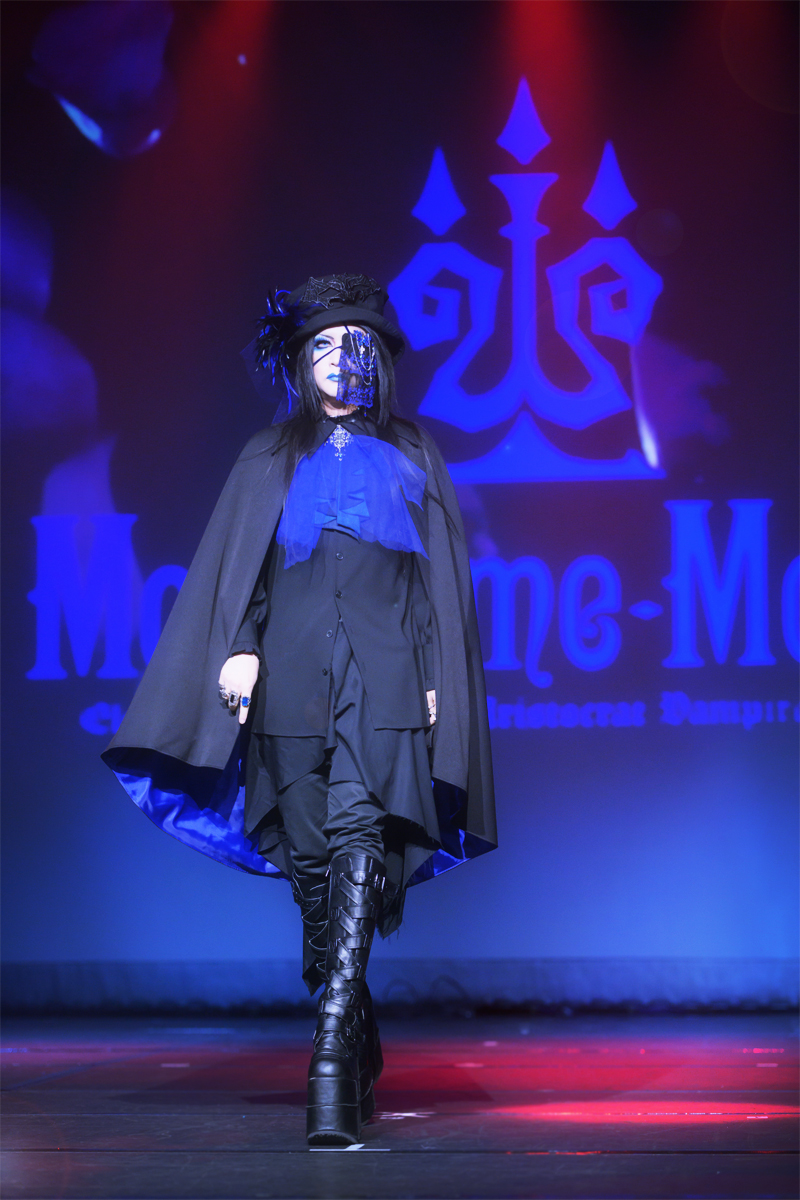
Musician Mana, pictured at a 2019 fashion show for his brand Moi-même-Moitié, is credited with helping to popularize Gothic Lolita.

People who have popularized the Lolita fashion include Yukari Tamura, Mana, and Novala Takemoto. Takemoto wrote the light novel Kamikaze Girls (2002) about the relationship between Momoko, a Lolita girl, and Ichigo, a yankī. The book was adapted into a film and a manga in 2004. Takemoto claims that "There are no leaders within the Lolita world." Mana is a musician who is known for popularizing Gothic Lolita fashion, which he calls "EGL," or "Elegant Gothic Lolita." He played in the rock band Malice Mizer (1992–2001) and founded the heavy metal band Moi dix Mois (2002–present). Both bands—whose members are known for eccentric expressions and elaborate costumes—are a part of the visual kei movement. Mana founded his own fashion label, known as Moi-même-Moitié in 1999, which specializes in Gothic Lolita. Both bands are very interested in the Rococo period.

The Government of Japan has also tried to popularize Lolita fashion. The Minister of Foreign Affairs in February 2009 assigned models to spread Japanese pop culture. These people were given the title of Kawaa Taishi (ambassadors of cuteness). The first three ambassadors of cuteness were model Misako Aoki, who represents the Lolita style of frills-and-lace, Yu Kimura, who represents the Harajuku style, and Shizuka Fujioka, who represents the school-uniform-styled fashion. Another way that Japan tries to popularize Japanese street fashion and Lolita is by organizing the international Harajuku walk in Japan, potentially leading other countries to organize similar walks.

Possible reasons for the popularity of Lolita fashion outside of Japan include a growing interest in Japanese culture as well as use of the Internet as a place to share information, leading to an increase in worldwide shopping and the opportunity for enthusiastic foreign Lolitas to purchase fashion items. JK uniforms, hanfu and Lolita are the three most popular types of clothing among China's Gen Z consumers. The origin of Japanese cultural influence in the West can be traced back to the late nineties when cultural goods such as Hello Kitty, Pokémon, and translated manga appeared in the West. Anime was already being imported to the West in the early nineties, and scholars also mention that anime and manga caused the popularity of Japanese culture to rise. This is supported by the idea that cultural streams have been flowing both from Japan to the West, and from the West to Japan.

== Motives ==
Lolita originated as a reaction against stifling Japanese society, in which young people are pressured to strictly adhere to gender roles and the expectations and responsibilities that are part of these roles. Wearing fashion inspired by childhood clothing is a reaction against this. This can be explained from two perspectives. Firstly, that it is a way to escape adulthood and to go back to the eternal beauty of childhood. Secondly, that it is an escape to a fantasy world, in which an ideal identity can be created that would not be acceptable in daily life.

Some Lolitas say they enjoy the dress of the subculture simply because it is fun and not as a protest against traditional Japanese society. Other motives could be that wearing the fashion style increases their self-confidence or to express an alternative identity.

== Socioeconomic dimension ==
Many of the very early Lolitas in the 1990s hand-made most of their clothing, and were inspired by the Dolly Kei movement of the previous decade. Because of the diffusion of fashion magazines people were able to use Lolita patterns to make their own clothing. Another way to own Lolita was to buy it second-hand. The do-it-yourself behaviour can be seen more frequently by people who cannot afford the expensive brands.

Once more retail stores began selling Lolita fashion, it became less common for Lolitas to make their own clothing. Partly due to the rise of e-commerce and globalization, Lolita clothing became more widely accessible with the help of the Internet. The market was quickly divided into multiple components: one which purchases mainly from Japanese or Chinese internet marketplaces, the other making use of shopping services to purchase Japanese brands, with some communities making larger orders as a group. Not every online shop delivers quality Lolita (inspired) products, a notorious example being Milanoo (2014). Some web shops sell brand replicas, which is frowned upon by many in this community. A Chinese replica manufacturer that is famous for her replica design is Oo Jia. Second-hand shopping is also an alternative to buying new pieces as items can be bought at a lower price (albeit with varying item condition) and is the sole method of obtaining pieces that are no longer produced by their respective brand.

== Sociocultural dimension ==
Many Lolitas consider being photographed without permission to be rude and disrespectful; however, some rules differ or overlap in different parts of this community. Lolitas often host meetings in public spaces such as parks, restaurants, cafes, shopping malls, public events, and festivals. Some meetings take place at members' homes, and often have custom house rules (e.g. each member must bring their own cupcake to the meeting). Lolita meetings are thus a social aspect of the Lolita fashion community, serving as an opportunity for members to meet one another. Many Lolitas also used to use Livejournal to communicate, but many have since switched to Facebook groups, Instagram, Pinterest, and Tumblr.

== Terminology ==
Lolita fashion emerged decades after the publication of Vladimir Nabokov's novel Lolita (1955). The first Japanese translation was published in 1959. The novel is about a middle-aged man, Humbert Humbert, who grooms and abuses a twelve-year-old girl nicknamed Lolita. Because the book focused on the controversial subject of pedophilia and underage sexuality, "Lolita" soon developed a negative connotation referring to a girl inappropriately sexualized at a very young age and associated with unacceptable sexual obsession. In Japan, however, discourse around the novel instead built on the country's romanticized girls' culture (shōjo bunka), and came to be a positive synonym for the "sweet and adorable" adolescent girl, without a perverse or sexual connotation.

Lolita was made into a movie in 1962, which did not show the disinterest that the titular character had in being sexualized. According to Novala Takemoto, the name "Lolita" became applied to the fashion because early fans of brands such as Jane Marple associated the style with the aesthetics of Kubrick's film, but not necessarily the story itself.

Another film adaptation was released in 1997. The 17-year-old Amy Fisher, who attempted to murder the wife of the 35-year-old man who had initiated a sexual relationship with her and whose crime was made into a film called The Amy Fisher Story (1993), was often called the Long Island Lolita. These films reinforced the sexual association in western cultures. Other racy connotations were created by Lolita Nylon advertisements (1964) and other media that used Lolita in sexual contexts.

Within Japanese culture the name refers to cuteness and elegance rather than to sexual attractiveness. Many Lolitas in Japan are not aware that Lolita is associated with Nabokov's book and they are disgusted by it when they discover such a relation.

Another common confusion is between the Lolita fashion style and cosplay. Although both originated in Japan, they are different and should be perceived as independent from each other. One is a fashion style while the other is role-play, with clothing and accessory being used to play a character. However, there may be some overlap between the groups. This can be seen at anime conventions such as the convention in Göteborg in which cosplay and Japanese fashion is mixed. For some Lolitas, it is insulting if people label their outfit as a costume.

== Gallery ==
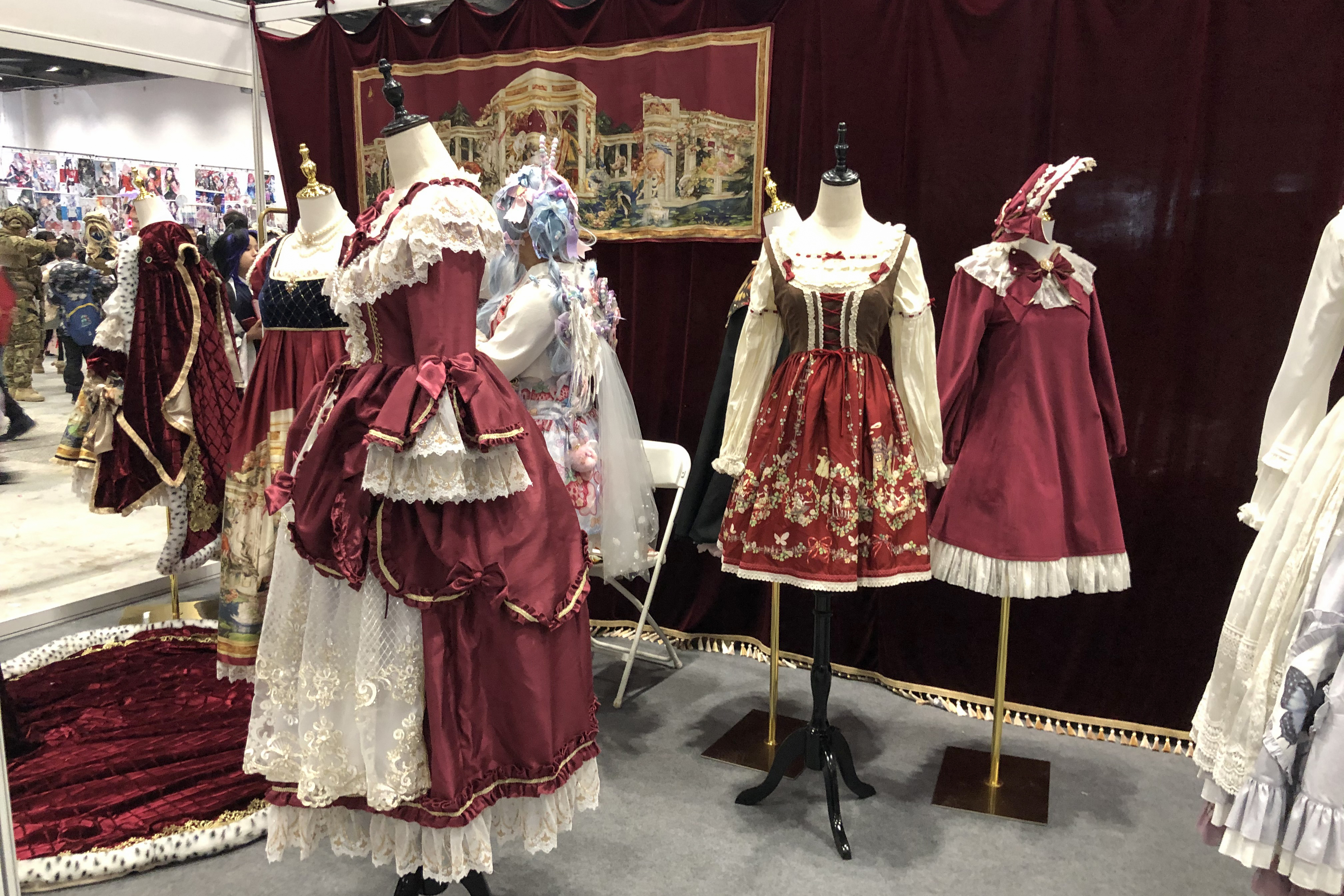
Hime Lolita

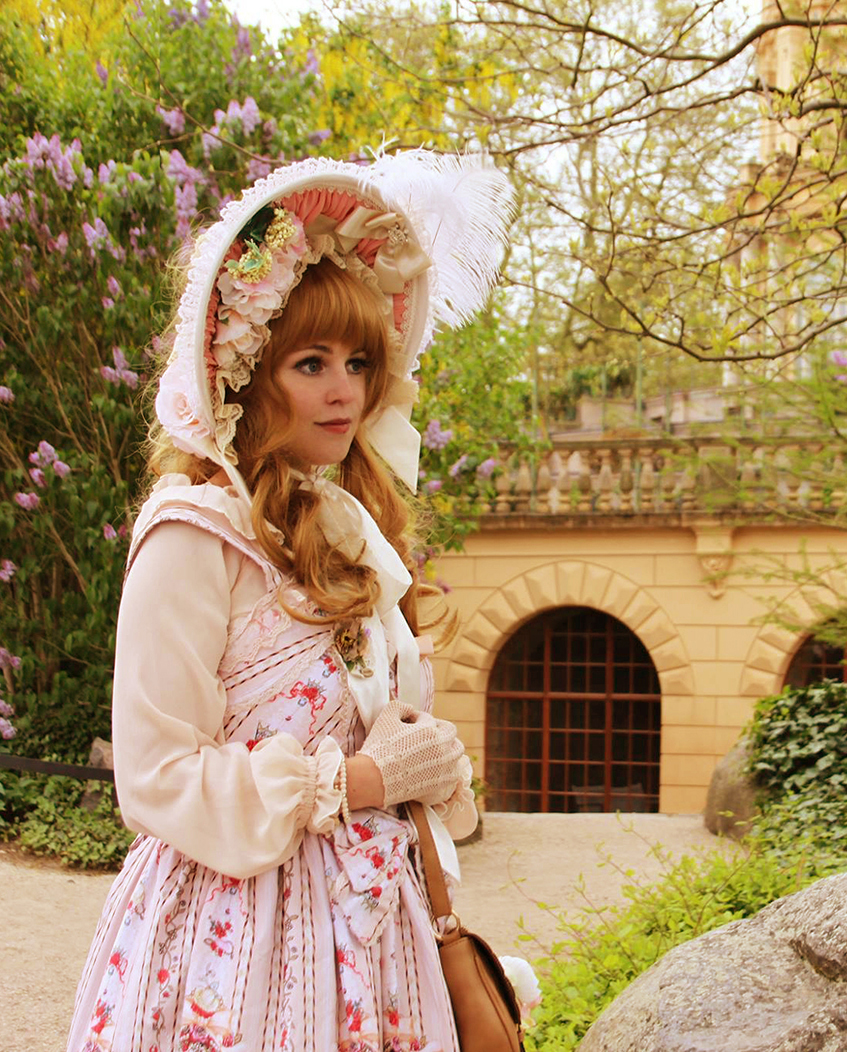
Classic Lolita

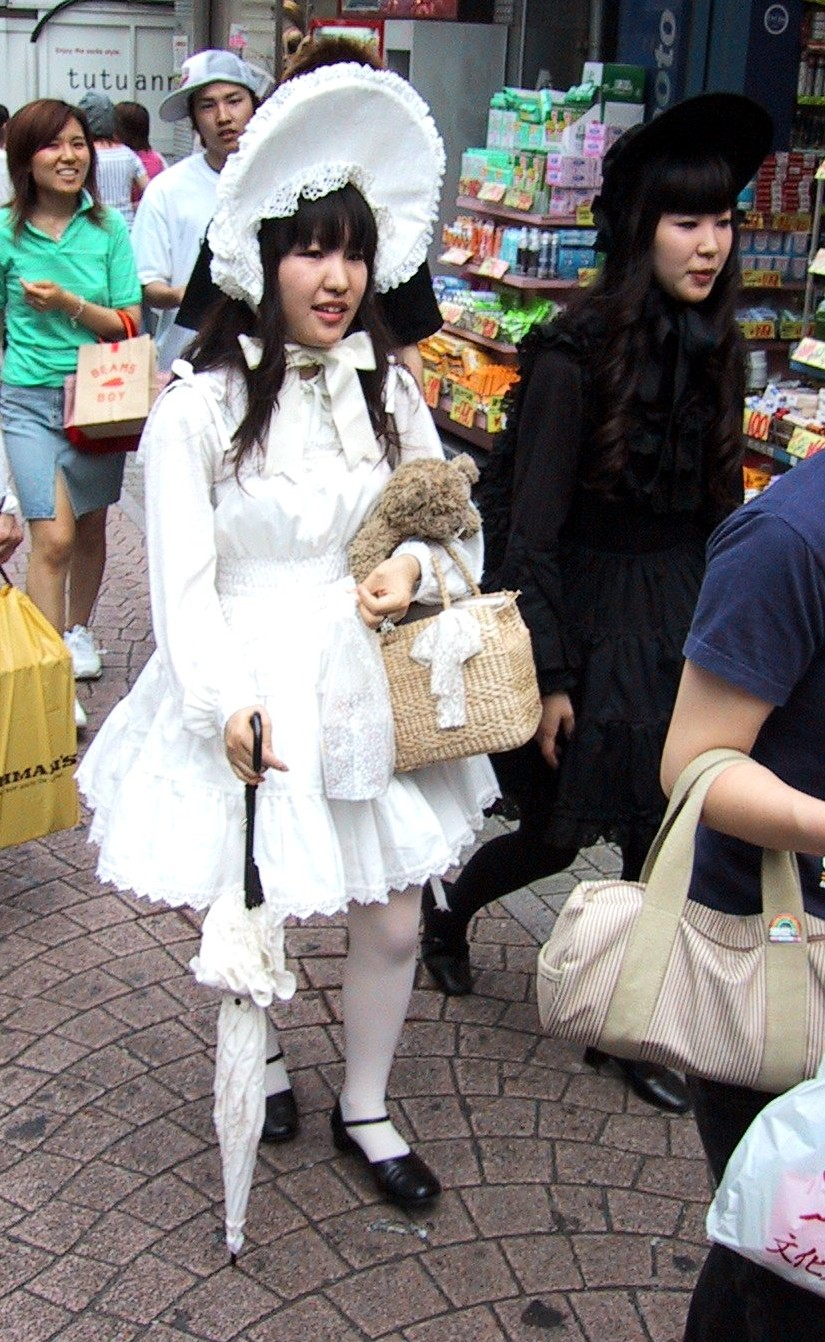
Shiro/White Lolita (left) and Kuro/Black Lolita (right)

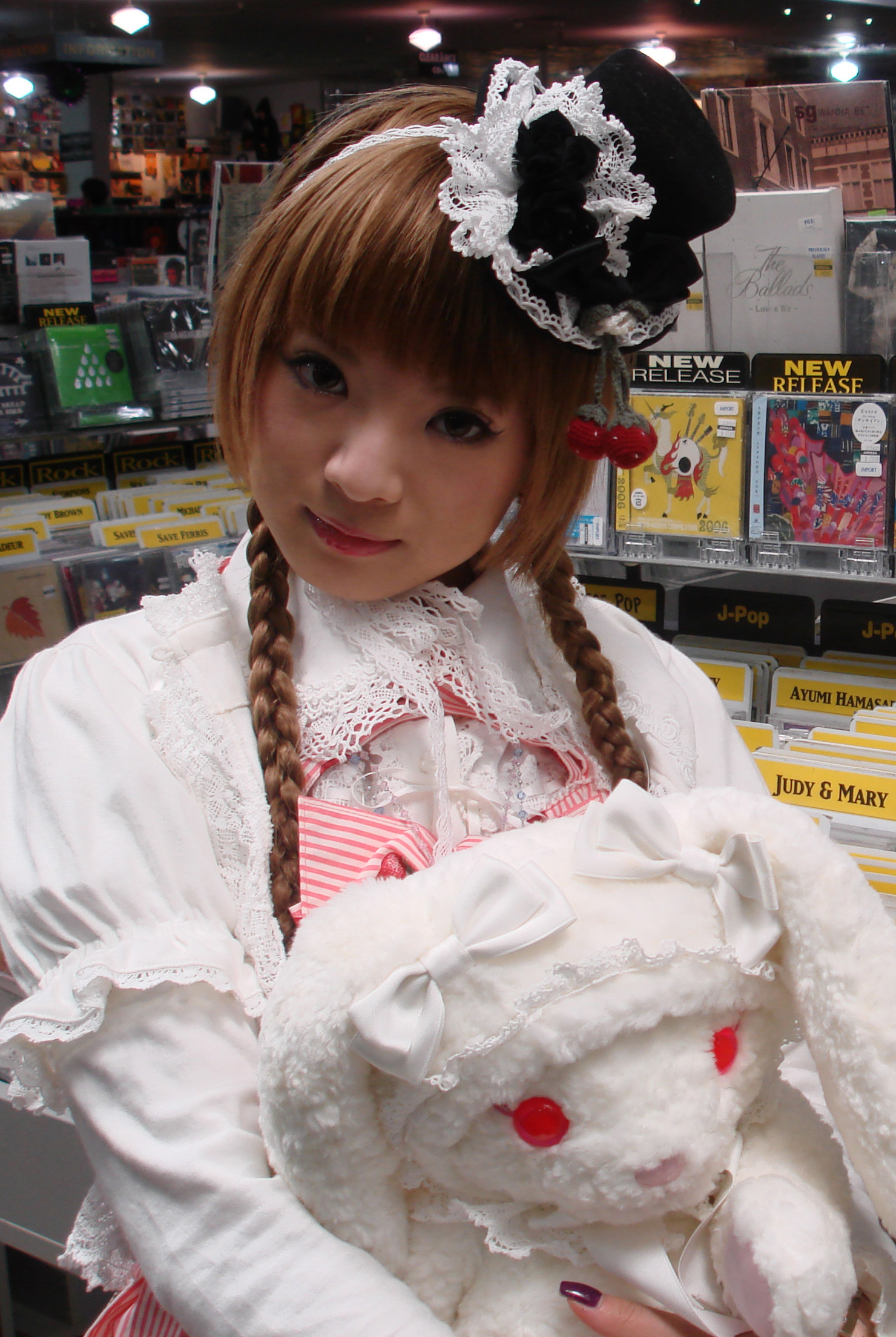
Sweet Lolita (Nana Kitade)

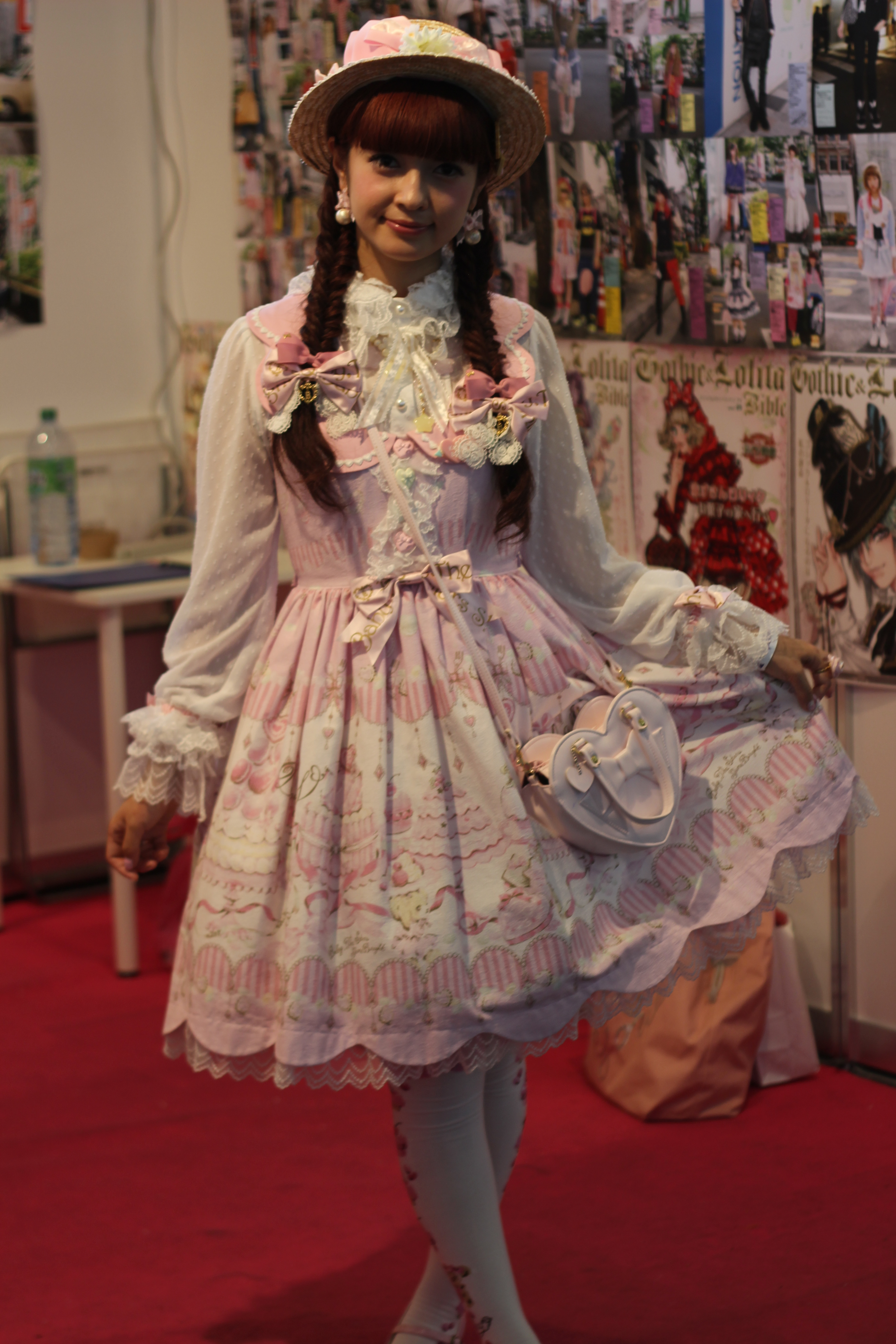
Sweet Lolita (Misako Aoki)

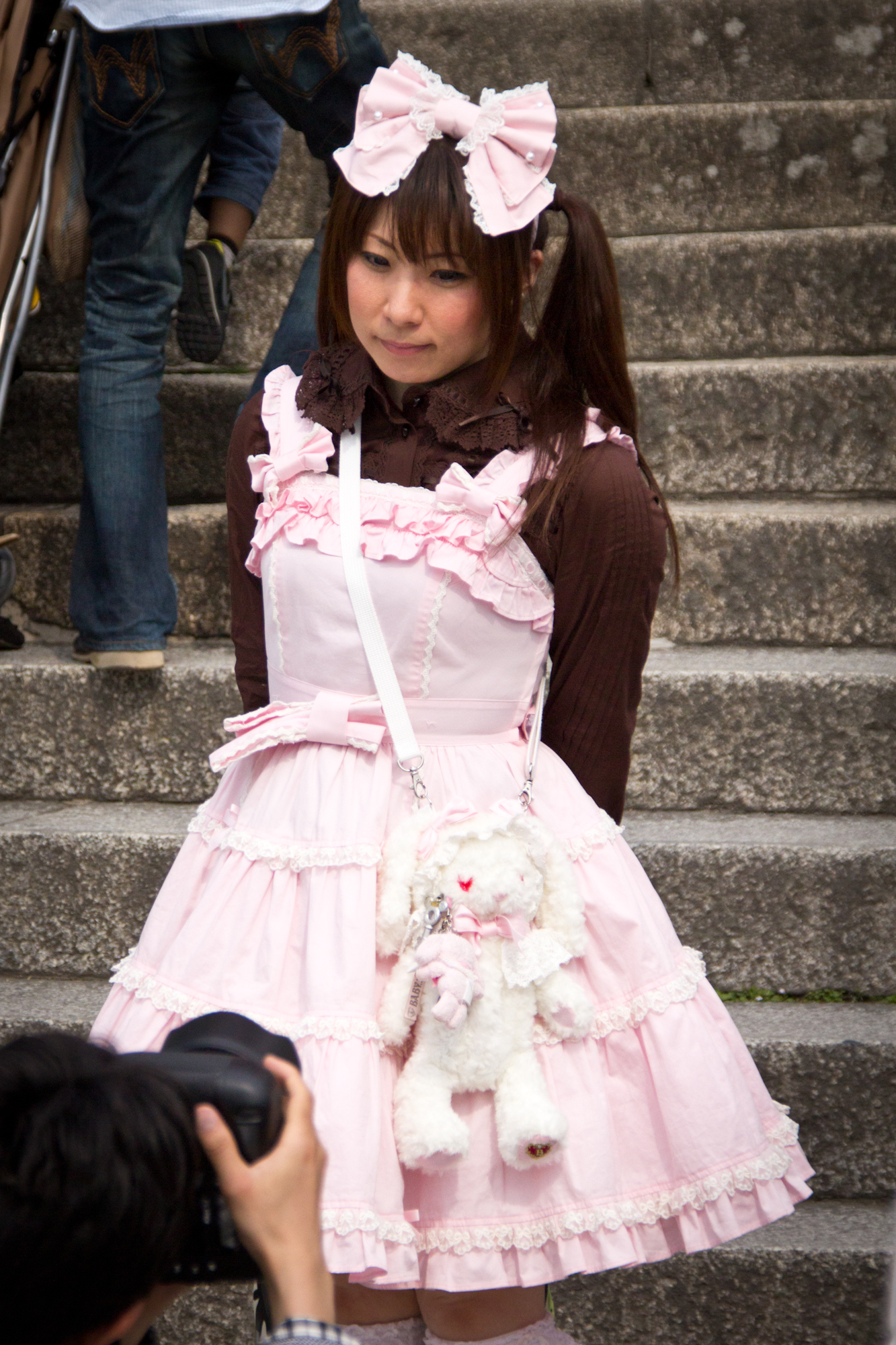
Sweet Lolita

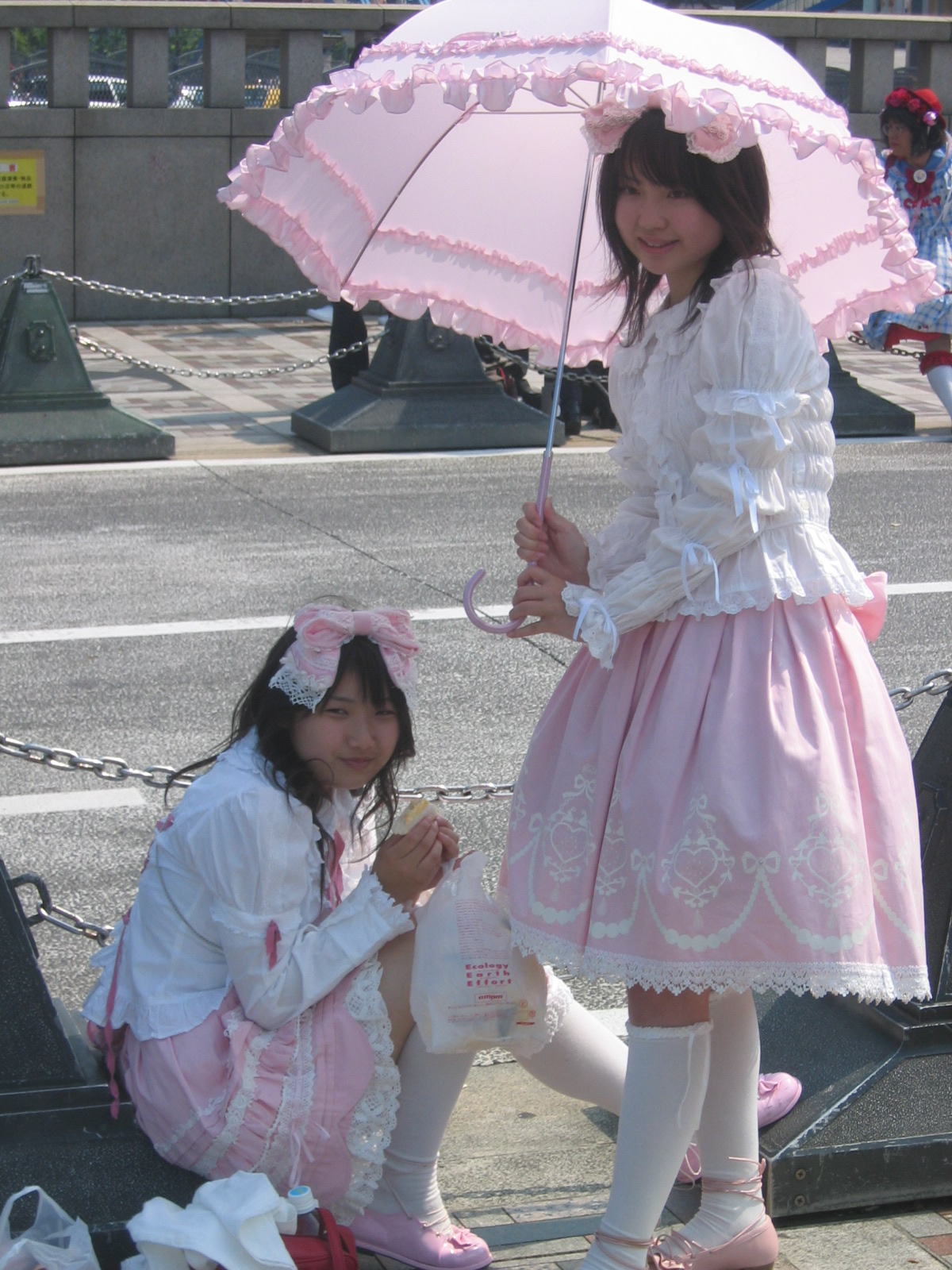
Sweet Lolita

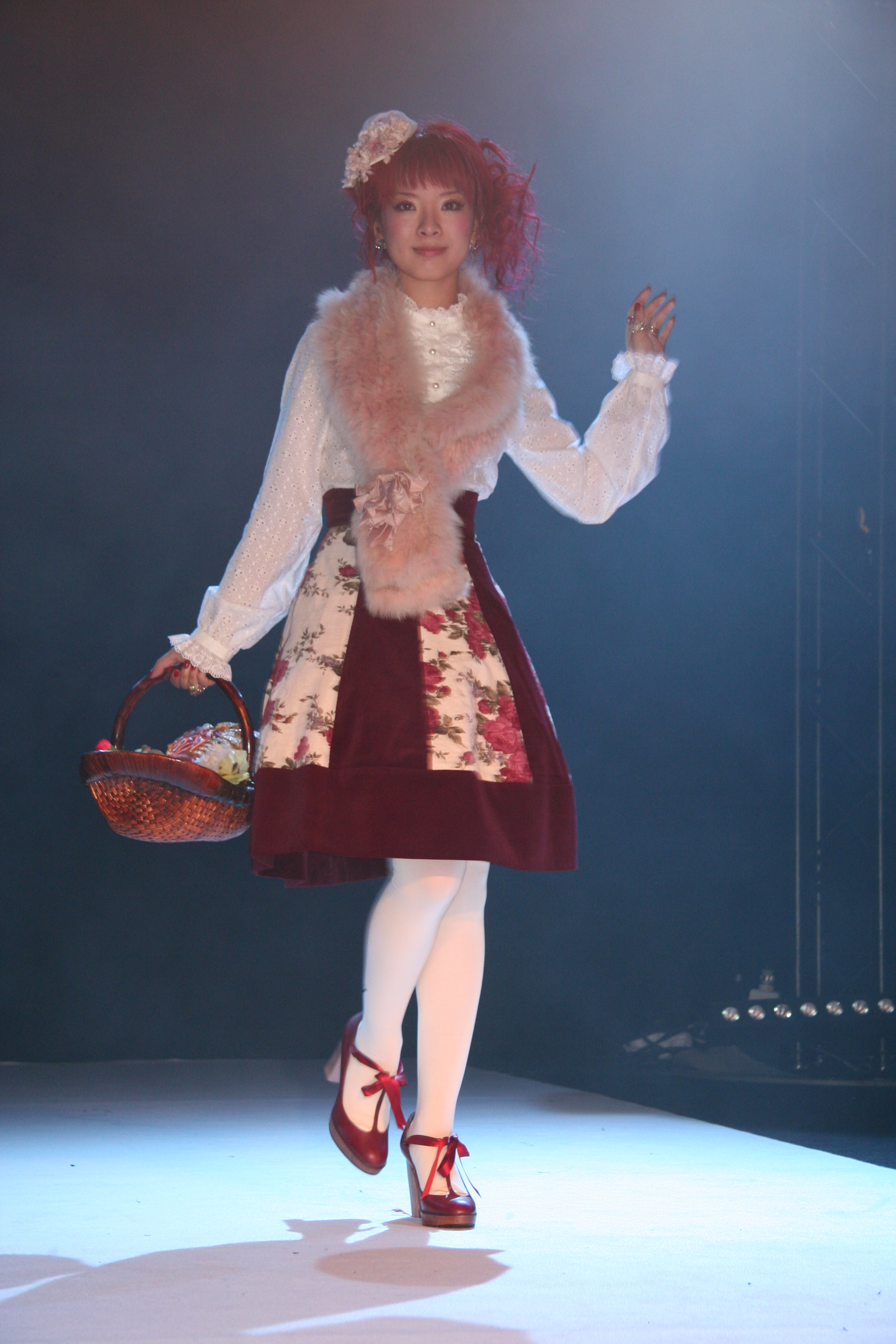
Country Lolita (Nana Kitade)

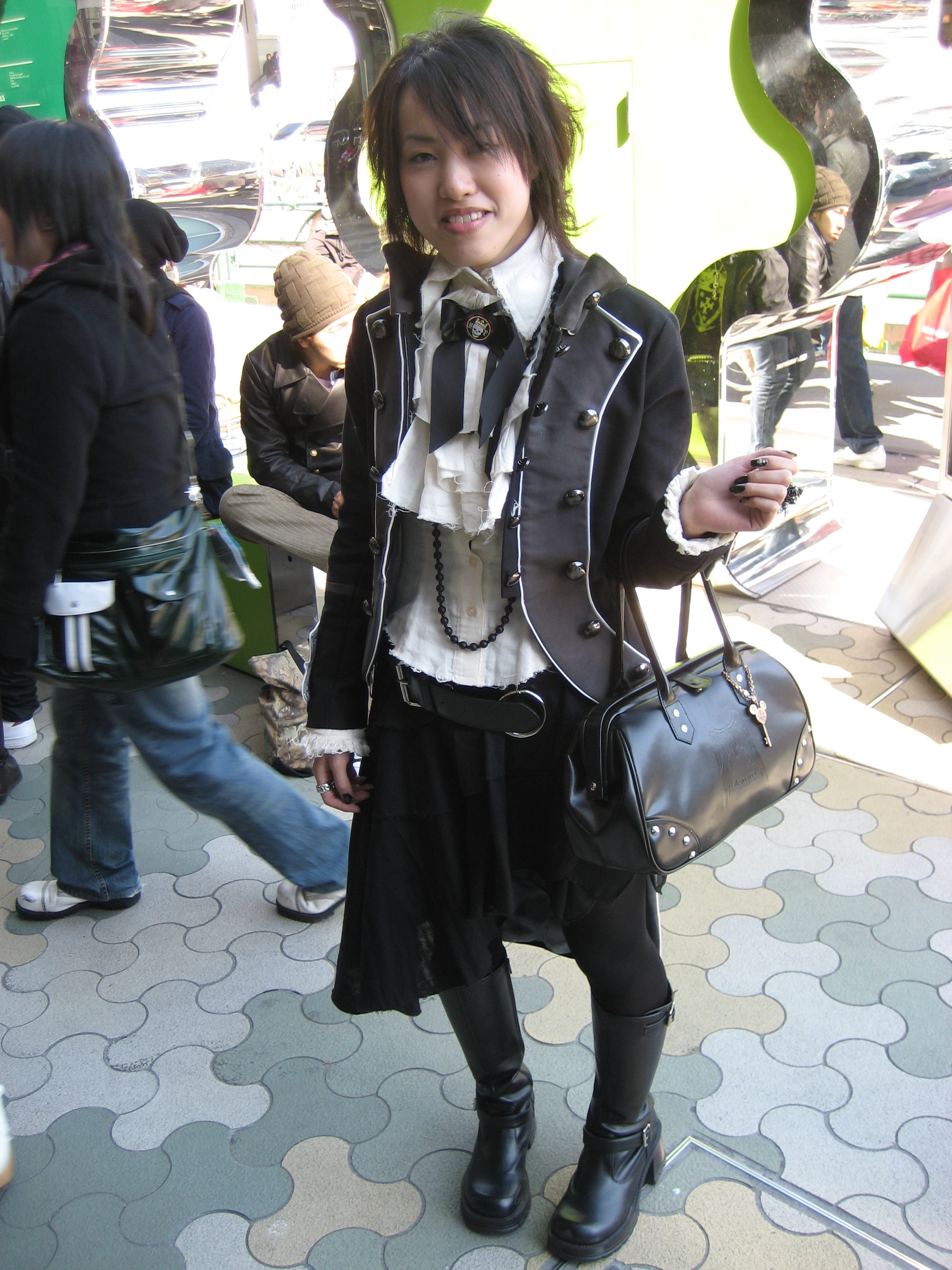
Pirate Lolita

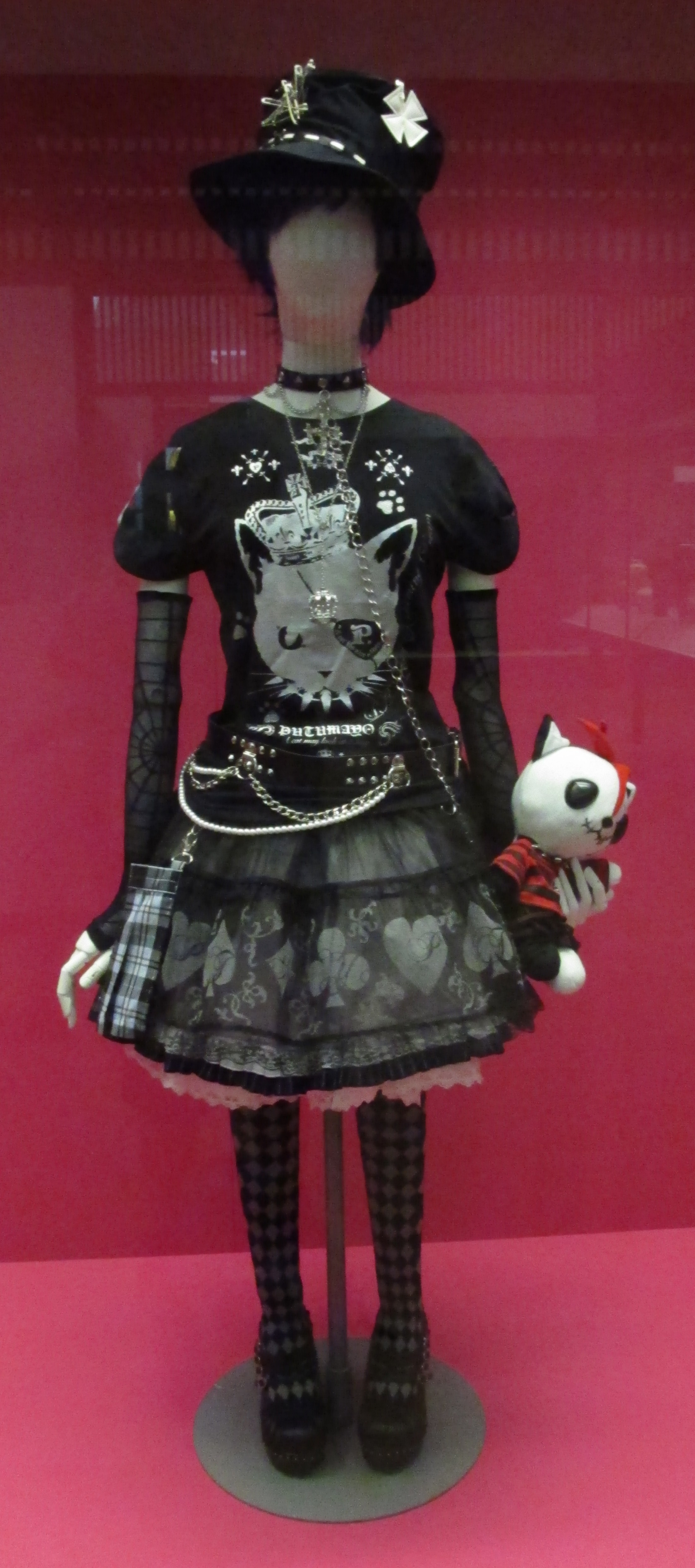
Punk Lolita

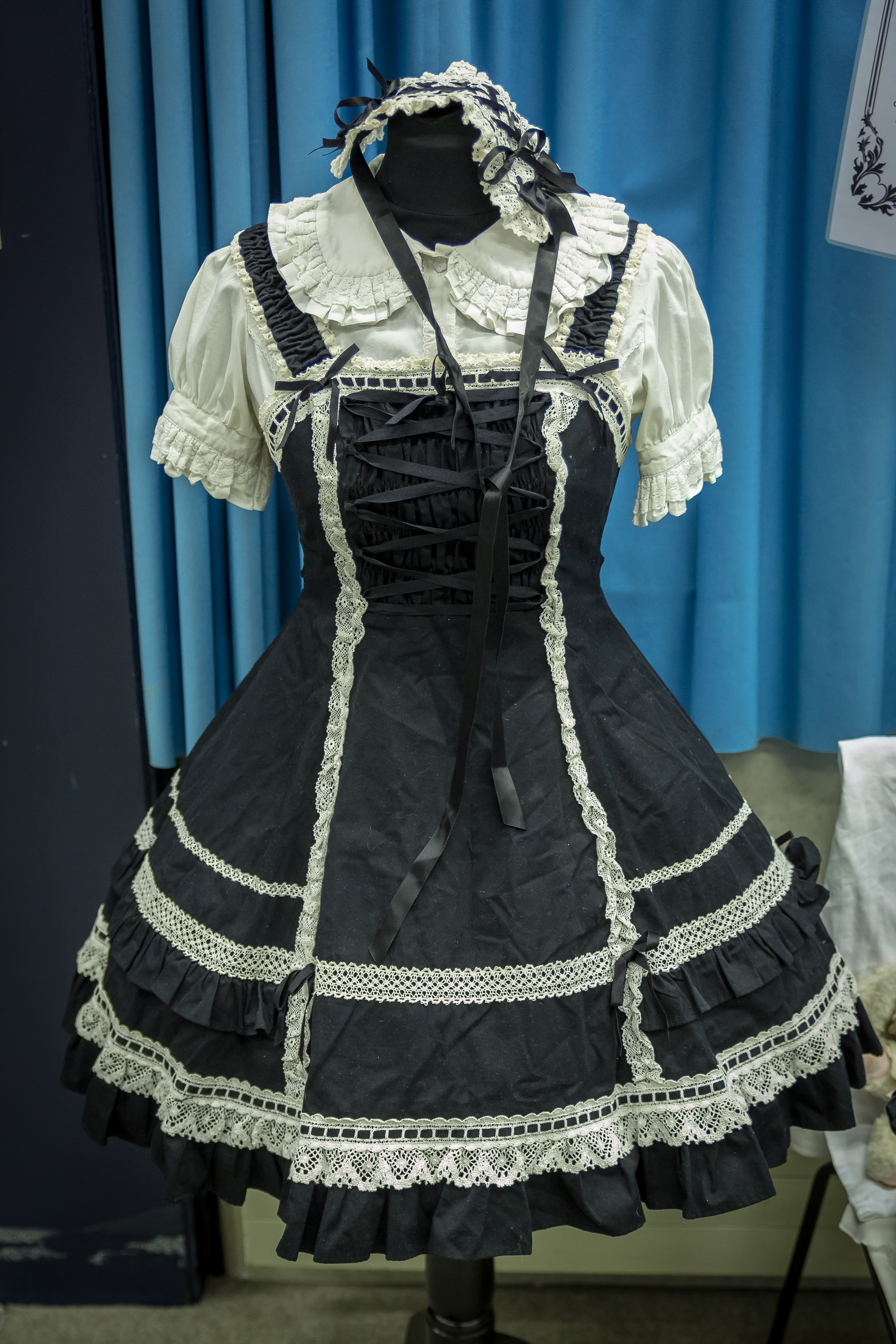
Old-School Lolita

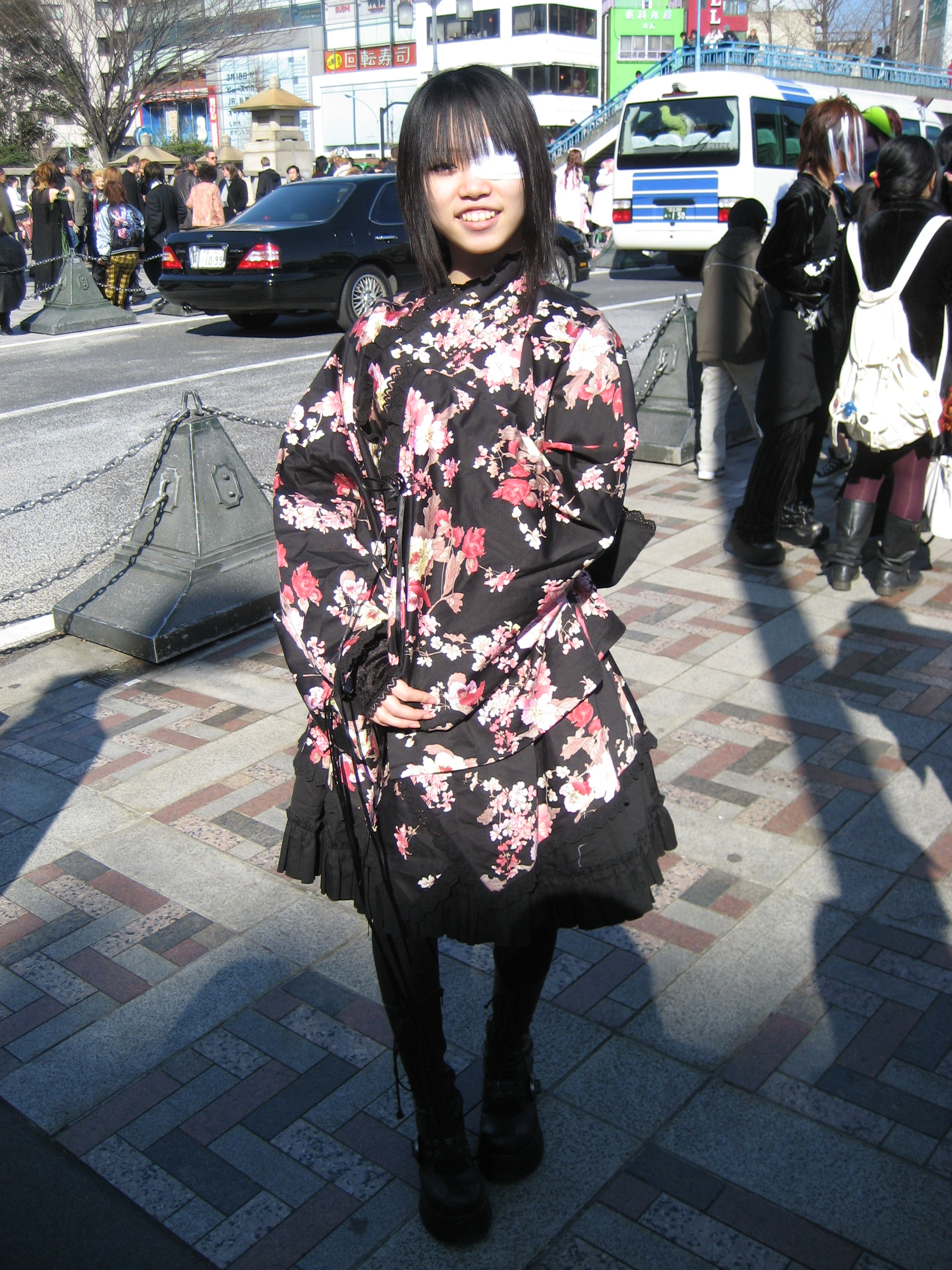
Wa-Lolita with characteristics of Guro Lolita (eyepatch)

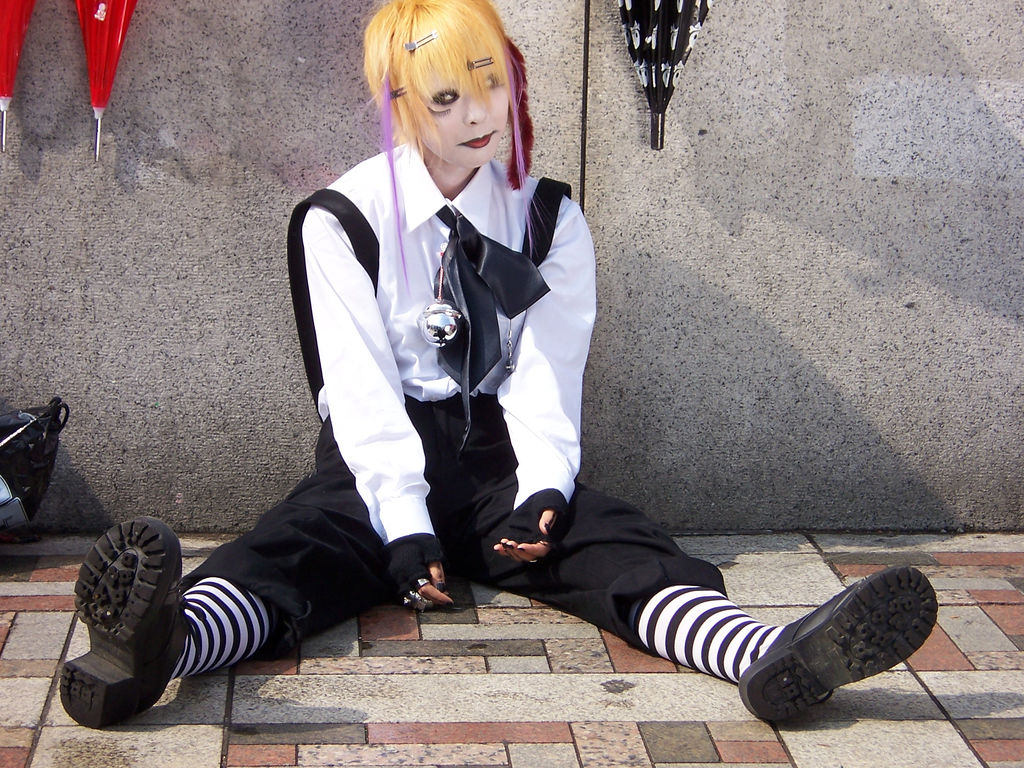
Ouji (a similar fashion with a more masculine appearance)

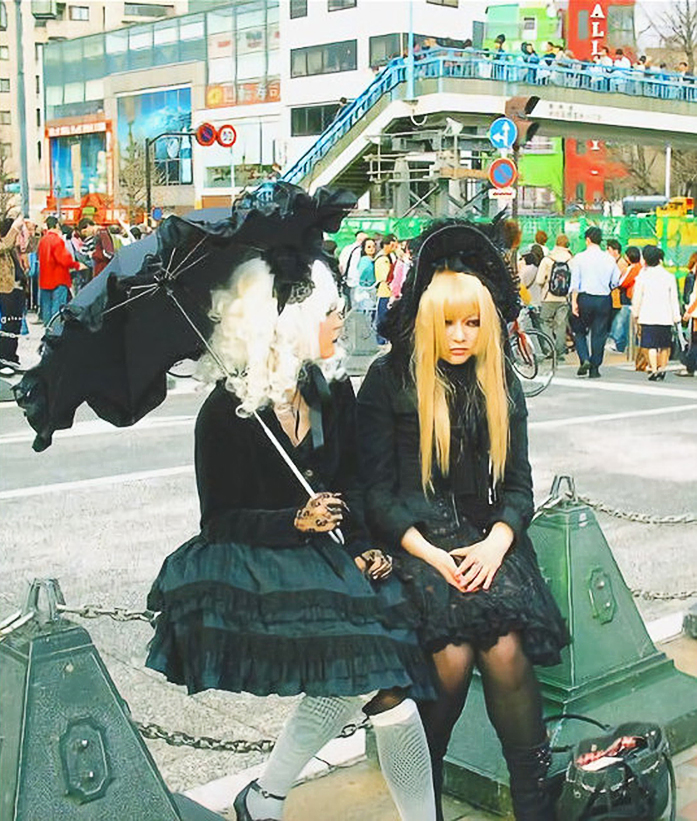
Gothic Lolita

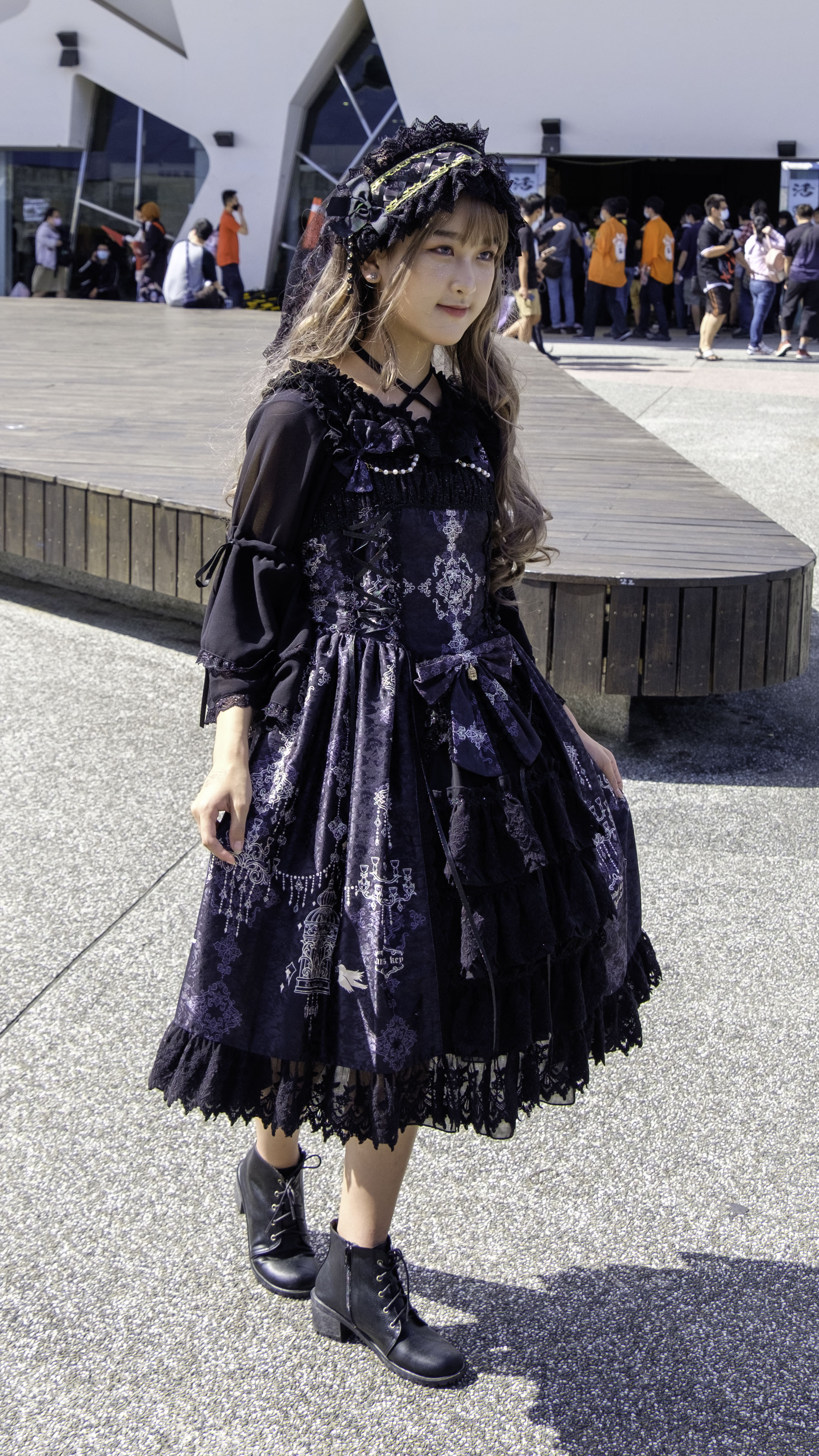
Gothic Lolita

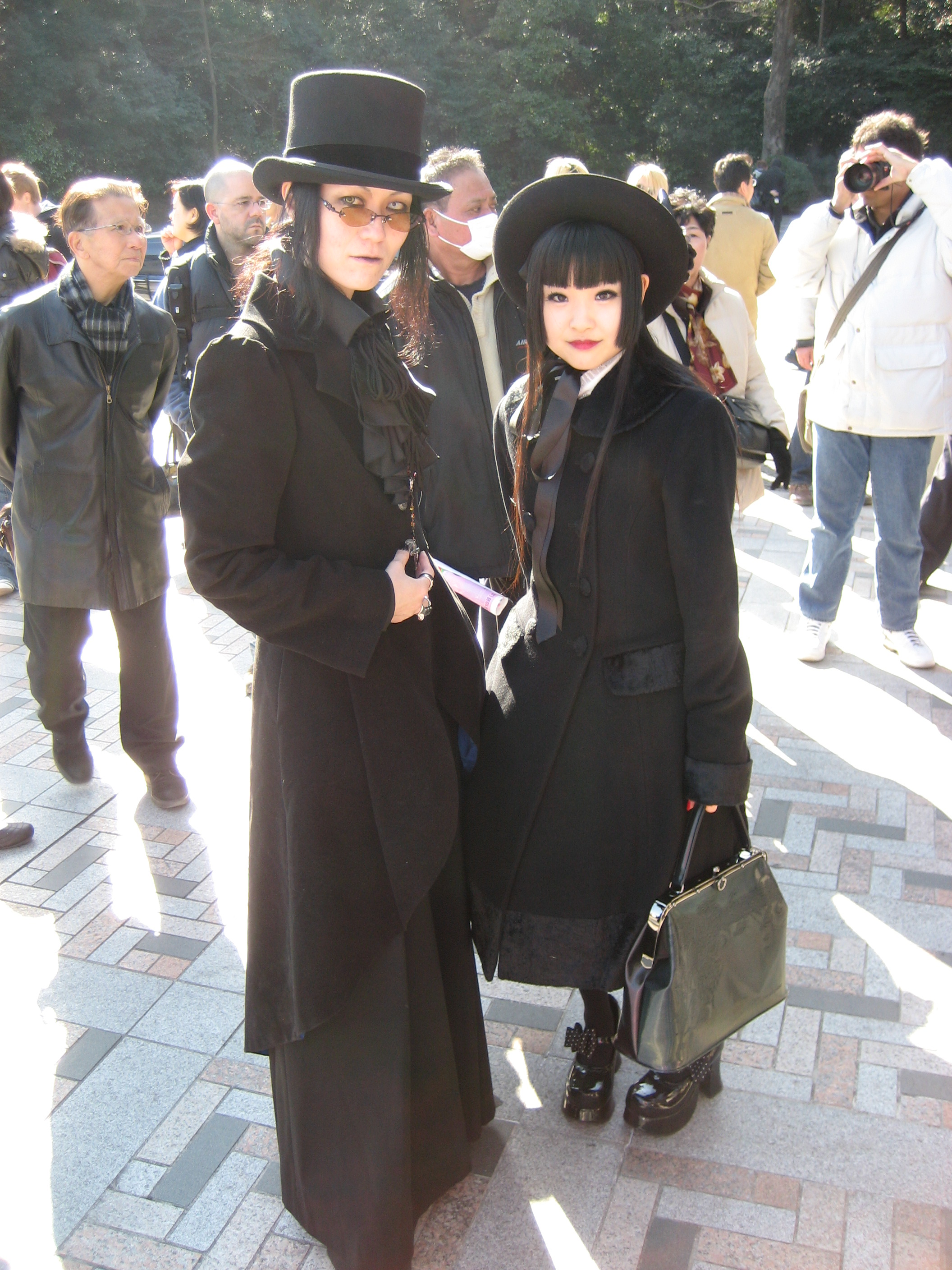
Elegant Gothic Aristocrat (left) and Gothic Lolita (right)

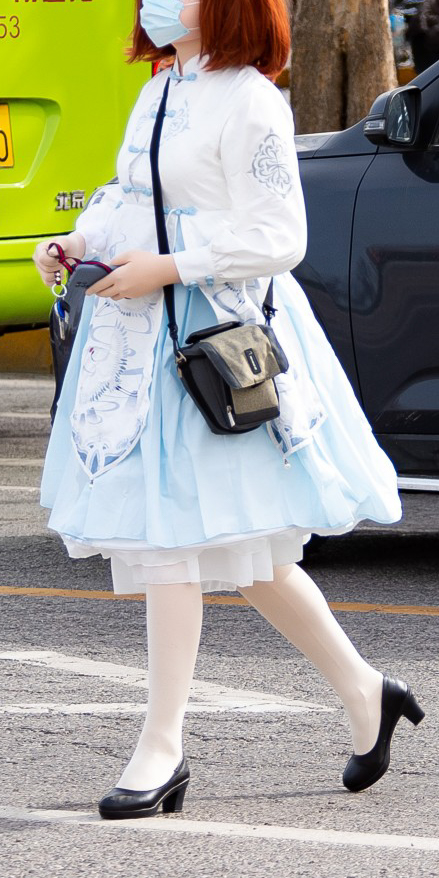
Qi Lolita (Chinese/Cheongsam inspired Lolita fashion)

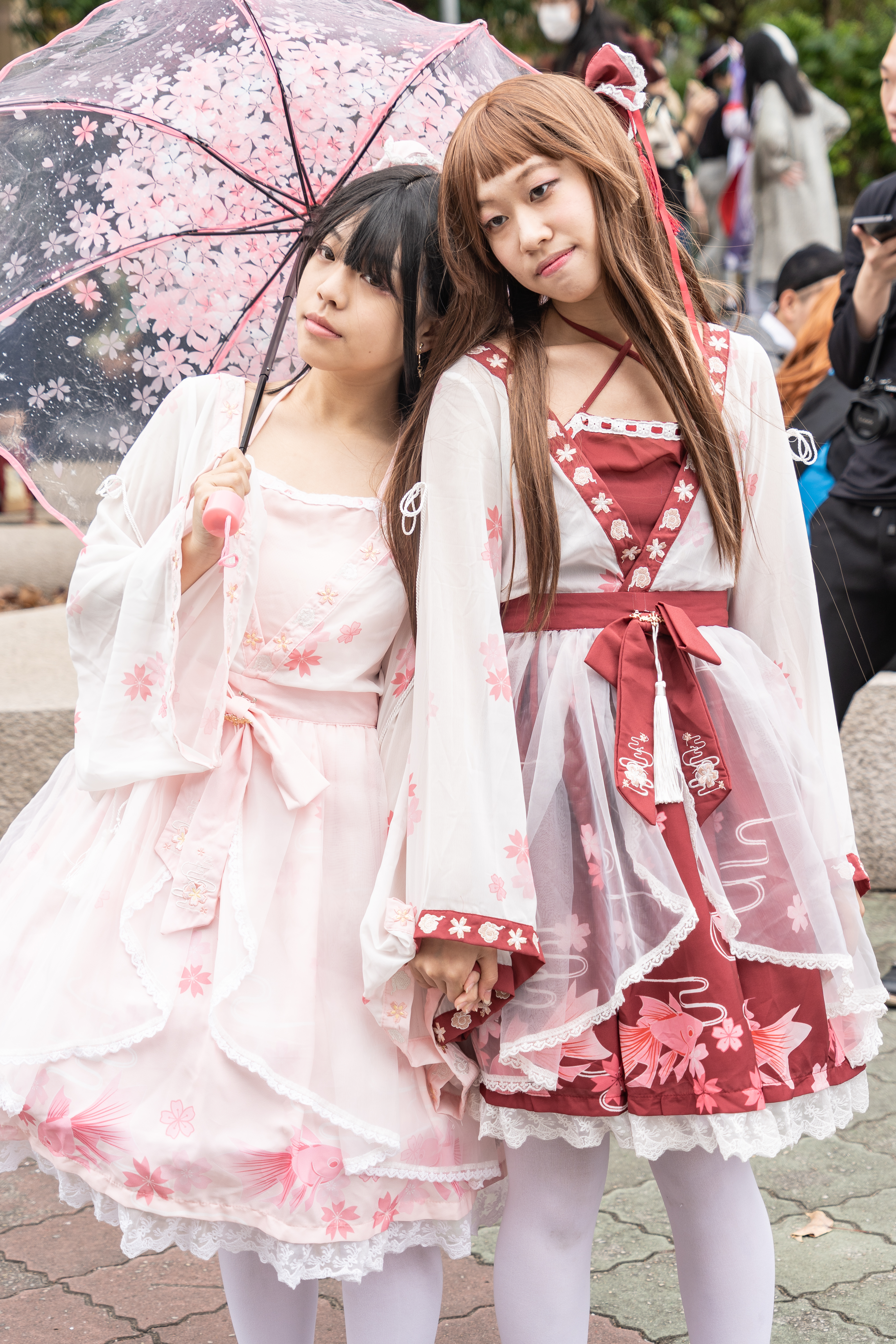
Hanfu inspired Qi Lolita fashion.

== See also ==
- Kamikaze Girls
- Kogal
- Gyaru
- Novala Takemoto
- Kinderwhore
