= Classic Lolita =

Fashion subculture

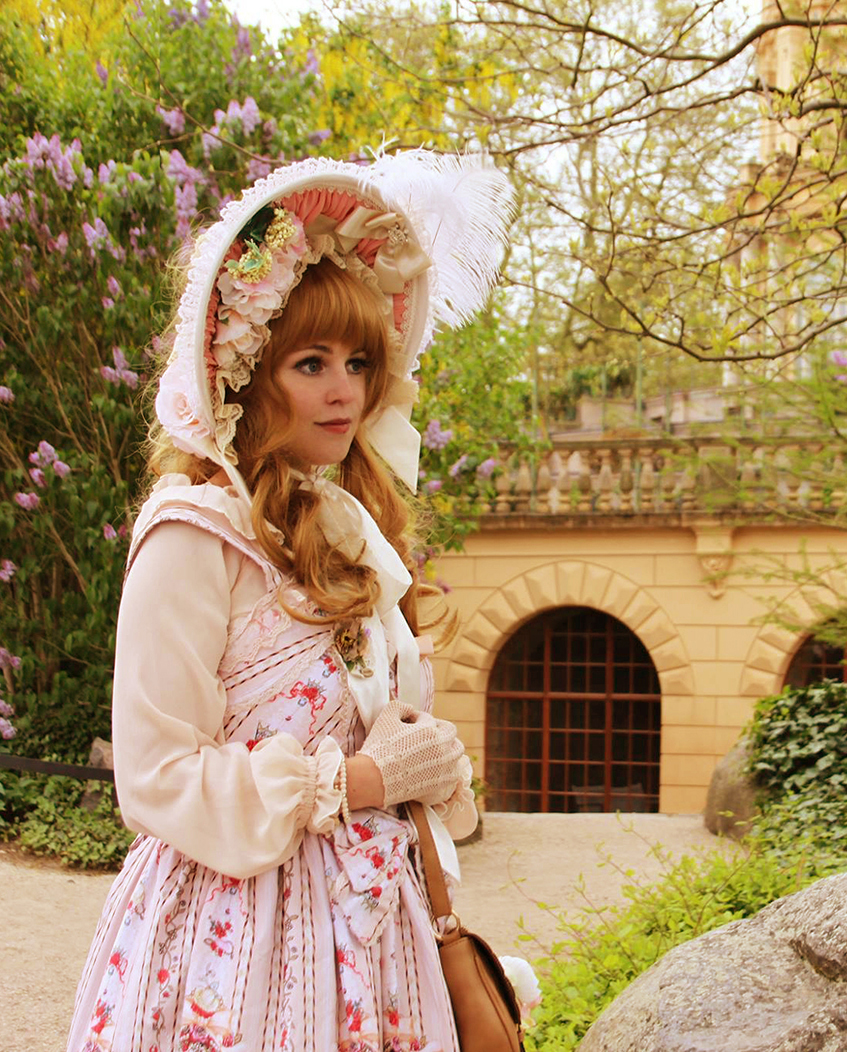
Girl in Classic Lolita fashion

Classic Lolita is a sub-style of Lolita fashion, originating in Japan and spreading to regions such as Asia, Europe and North America. This style draws on European historical clothing, particularly the aesthetics of the Victorian and Edwardian eras and also incorporates elements associated with Rococo style, including imagery linked to Marie Antoinette.

Among the various sub-styles of Lolita fashion, Classic Lolita is often described as a relatively traditional type. It is characterised by restrained ornamentation and a retro-inspired aesthetic.

Common clothing elements include fluffy skirts, lace and bow decorations, and garments inspired by historical clothing, such as bloomers. In terms of colour application, Classic Lolita often uses softer, lower-saturation tones such as pink, beige, and light purple.

== Origins ==
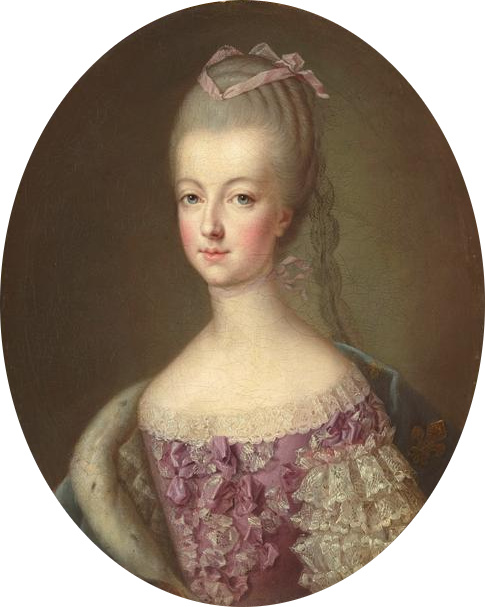
Marie Antoinette

Classic Lolita draws on elements of European historical dress, particularly the decorative aesthetics of the eighteenth century Rococo fashion and its later cultural associations. Among these references, Marie Antoinette is frequently cited as a symbolic figure. During her lifetime, the French queen was associated with elaborate court dress featuring wide skirts, lace, pearls, and accessories such as hats and fans.

These elements later became associated with aristocratic femininity and luxury in popular historical imagination. Within Lolita culture, the image of a "noble lady" or "princess-like" figure is often connected to this imagery, and some Lolita garments have been named after Marie Antoinette. In addition to Marie Antoinette, some enthusiasts regard Madame de Pompadour as a symbolic figure associated with Rococo aesthetics.

== Influences ==
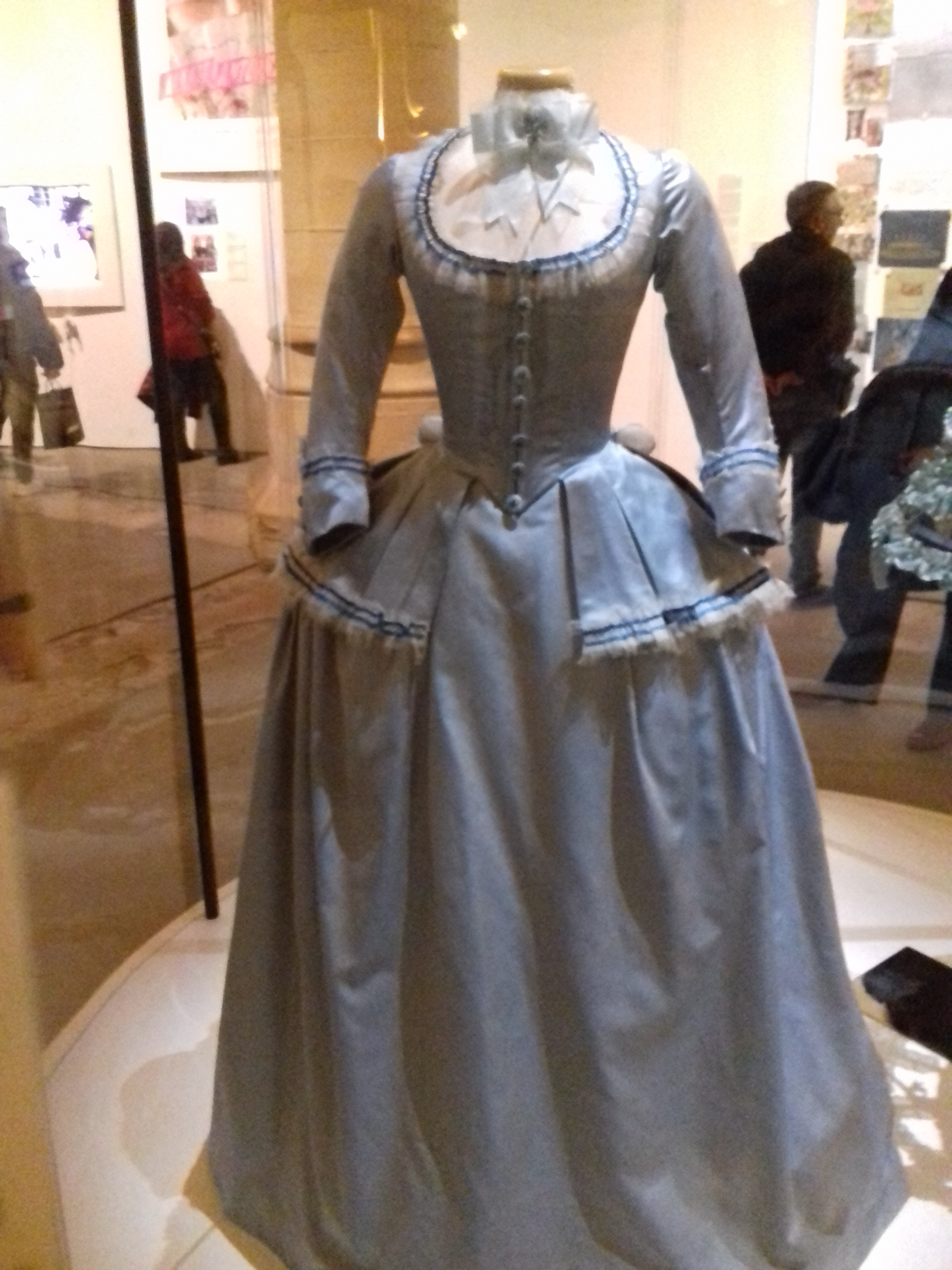
Vintage clothing from the era of Marie

Classic Lolita incorporates decorative elements associated with Rococo fashion, including lace, ruffles, ribbons, and intricate textile patterns, but reinterprets them in a modern Japanese fashion context.

While historical Rococo garments often featured low necklines and more revealing silhouettes, contemporary Lolita styles, particularly Classic Lolita, generally adopt more modest designs. The style combines Rococo ornamentation with the more restrained silhouettes associated with nineteenth-century European dress. It has been described as Bo-Peep meeting a Victorian lady with Rococo-style exaggeration.

References to Rococo aesthetics also appear in discussions of Lolita culture and its representations in popular media. For example, the novel Kamikaze Girls portrays Rococo imagery as a part of an aesthetic lifestyle and personal self-expression, a theme discussed in interpretations of Lolita fashion.

== Characteristics ==
Classic Lolita is often associated with a more mature interpretation of Lolita fashion and is frequently linked to nineteenth-century European elegance. The style is generally connected with the image of a refined and well-mannered young lady (お嬢様 Ojō-sama). Compared with Sweet Lolita, which commonly features pastel colours and highly decorative designs, Classic Lolita generally uses more subdued colour palettes and more restrained ornamentation. Typical Classic Lolita outfits include a high-neck blouse, a knee-length or slightly longer skirt, multiple petticoats, tights or stockings, and coordinated headwear. The silhouette usually emphasises a bell-shaped or A-line skirt supported by structured petticoats. Through layered garments and controlled tailoring, the style places less emphasis on the body's natural shape and instead highlights a structured and balanced silhouette.

In terms of colour and materials, Classic Lolita often uses muted tones such as beige, brown, deep reds, or nostalgic floral patterns. Decorative elements such as lace and ruffles remain present but are typically used more sparingly than in other Lolita substyles. Greater emphasis is placed on fabric texture, tailoring, and overall compositional balance.

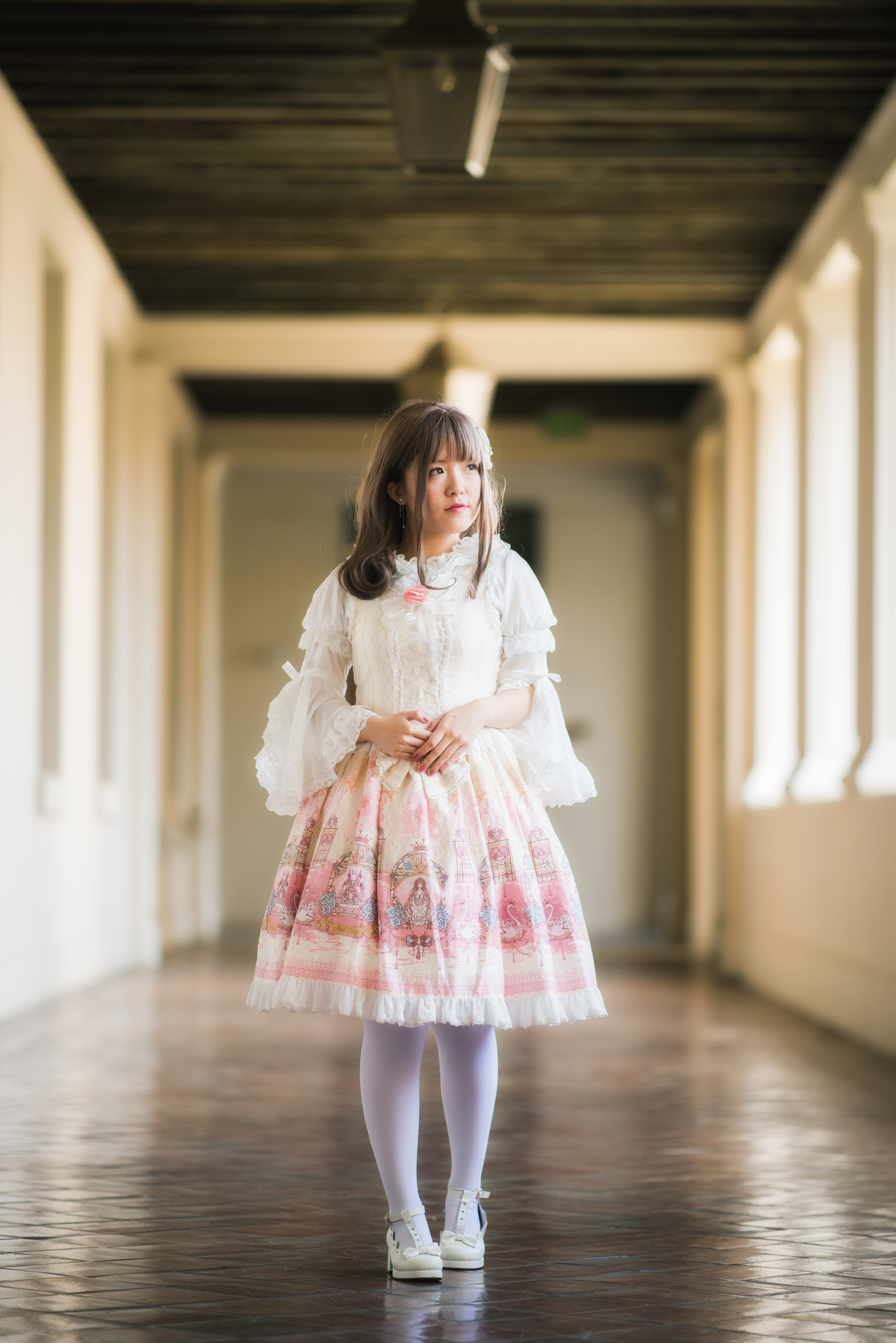
A girl dressed in a classic Lolita

== Development ==
Despite the use of the term "classic," Classic Lolita was not the earliest form of Lolita fashion. Instead it emerged after Lolita fashion had already developed as a recognisable category within Japanese street fashion.

Scholars and fashion commentators often describe the development of Lolita fashion in several stages, including an early pioneering period during the 1970s and early 1980s, the consolidation of Lolita as a fashion category in the early 1990s, and the diversification of stylistic subcategories from the late 1990s onward.

Unlike Gothic Lolita, which is often linked to specific designers or turning points in fashion history, Classic Lolita developed more gradually through the influence of multiple brands.

== Brands ==
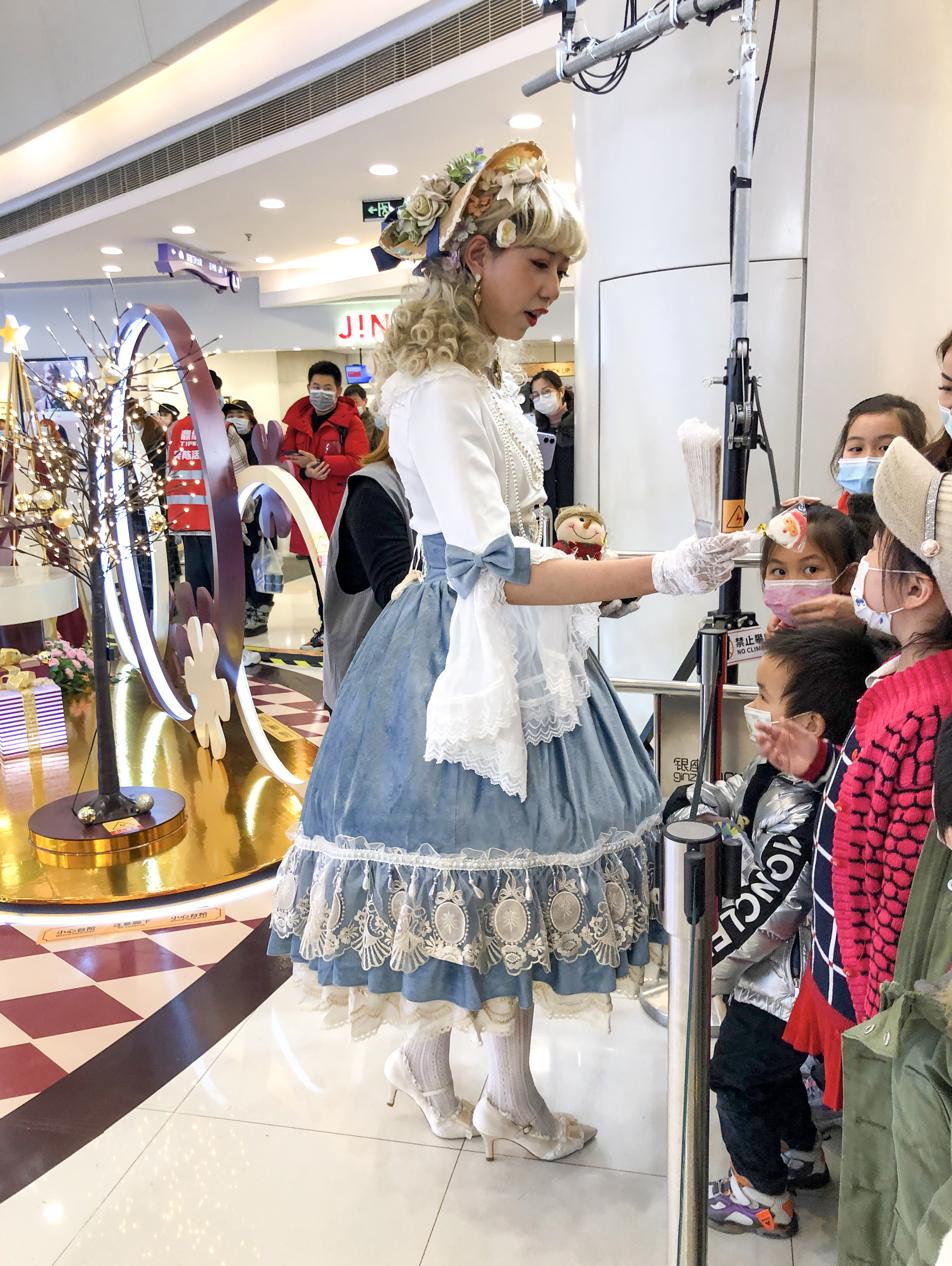
Classic Lolita style clothing and accessory

Several Japanese fashion brands contributed to the visual language that later influenced Classic Lolita. Early brands such as Milk, Pink House, and Jane Marple incorporated design elements such as lace, ribbons, and layered skirts, which later became central to Lolita fashion aesthetics.

Pink House, in particular, contributed to the development of a romantic "girlhood" aesthetic through the use of chiffon fabrics, layered petticoats, and floral prints. Jane Marple, founded in 1985, is often regarded as exhibiting early stylistic features associated with Lolita fashion.

Labels frequently associated with the style include Victorian Maiden, Mary Magdalene, Excentrique, and Innocent World. These brands often draw inspiration from European historical garments and emphasise classical colour palettes, refined tailoring, and relatively restrained decoration.

Through the influence of these brands, Classic Lolita gradually developed a recognisable visual standard characterised by structured silhouettes, historically inspired design motifs, and a relatively subdued decorative style.

Brand	Description
Victorian Maiden (founded 1998)	Often described as a representative brand of Classic Lolita, known for designs reflecting elements of nineteenth-century fashion.
Mary Magdalene (founded 2003)	A small label specializing in Classic Lolita style. Designer Tanaka Reiko is known for tailored silhouettes inspired by European historical garments.
Excentrique	Known for a "classical and lyrical" style, drawing inspiration from European antique garments.
Innocent World	An influential brand within the Lolita community. Its designs are associated with more subdued colours and relatively restrained decoration compared with Sweet Lolita.

== See also ==
- Lolita fashion
- Gothic Lolita
- Gyaru
- Japanese street fashion
- Kawaii
