= Metamorphose temps de fille =

Japanese clothing boutique chain

- Founded: 1997 in Kyoto, Japan
- Founder: Kuniko Kato
- Area served: Japan
- Products: Apparel
- Website: www.metamorphose.gr.jp

Metamorphose temps de fille, also shortened to Metamorphose, is a Japanese apparel brand specializing in lolita fashion. It was created in 1997 by Kuniko Kato.

== Brand concept ==
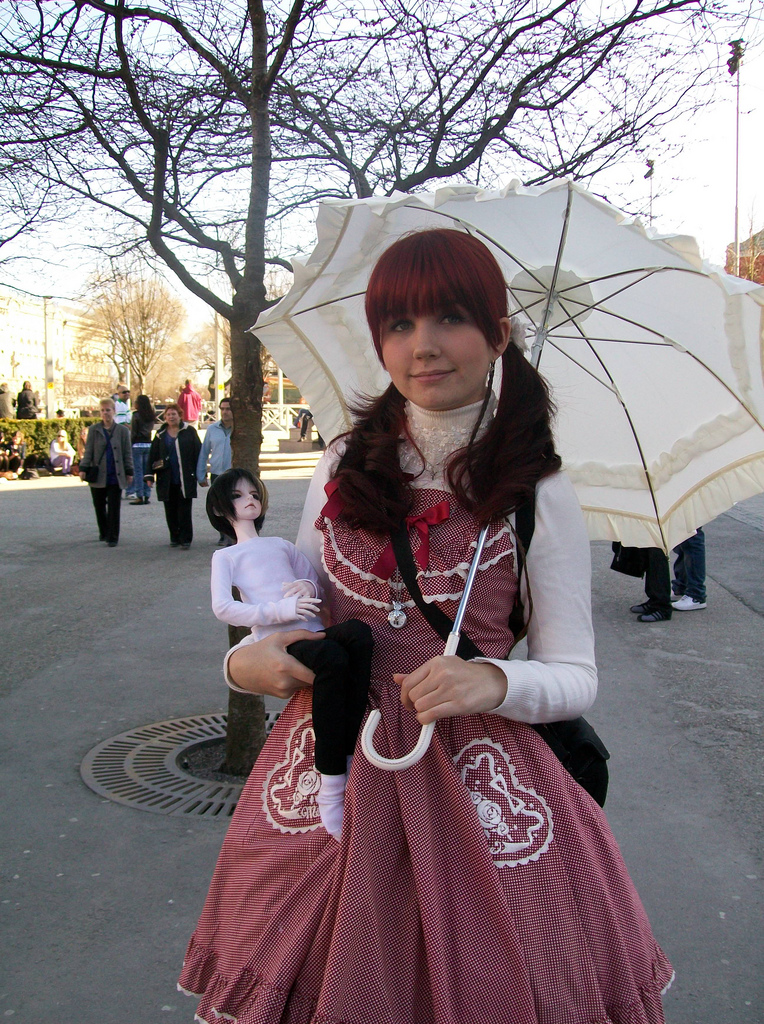
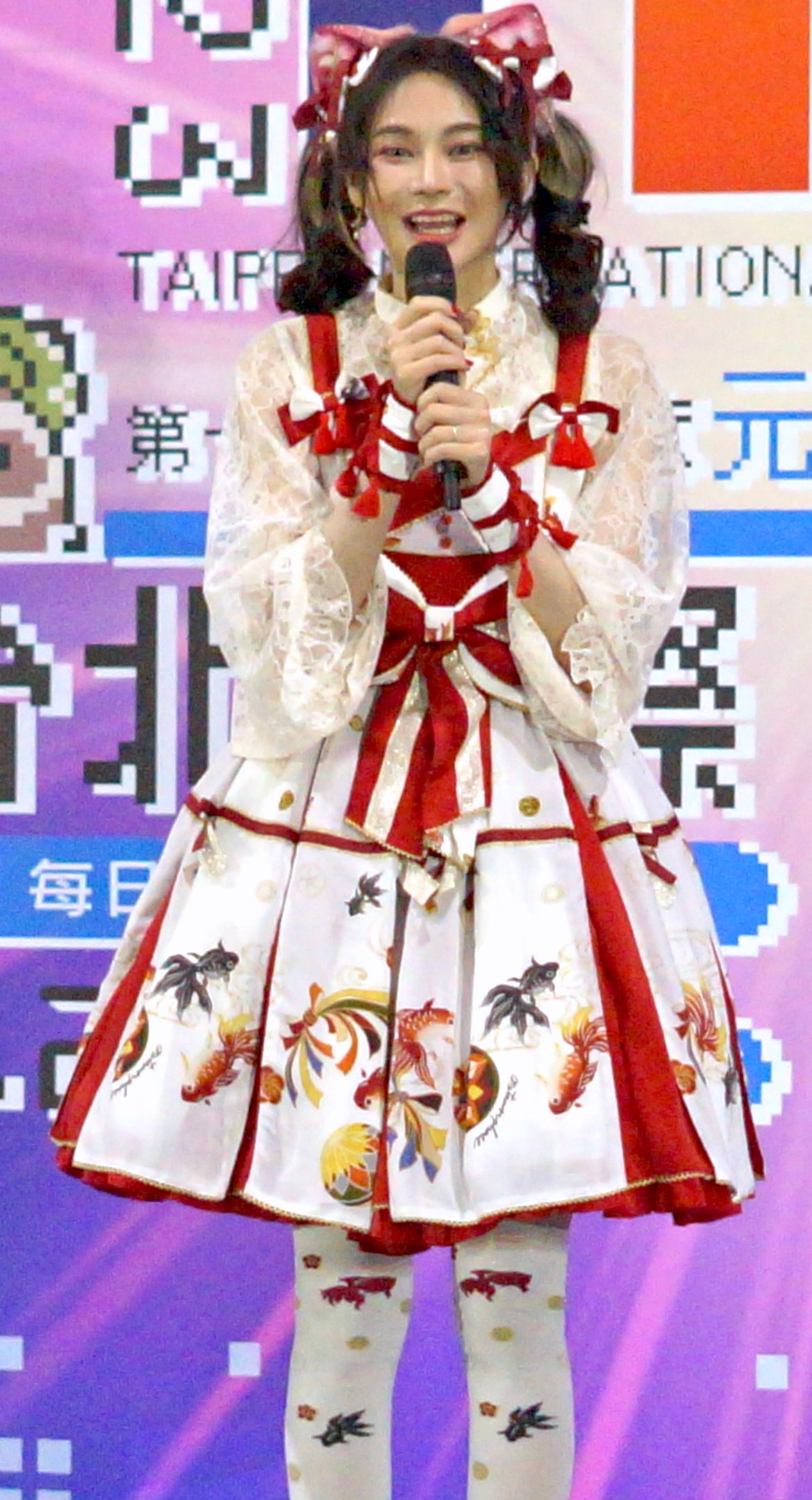
A person (pictured in 2007) and Lai Pin-yu (pictured in 2023) wearing clothing from Metamorphose temps de fille

Metamorphose temps de fille is a lolita fashion brand. The full title of the brand is "Manifestange Metamorphose temps de fille", where "manifestange" means the "advent of an angel" and "metamorphose temps de fille" means "the time of transformation into a little girl". Metamorphose temps de fille stated that the name of their brand is based on the idea of "transform[ing] oneself, be it an angel, someone who is more elegant, or even back to the time when they were a little girl".

The brand is known for its "retro" and "sweet" designs. The brand is also known for offering larger size options, which found popularity with a North American audience. Apart from their main line, Metamorphose temps de fille also has a sub-label, Crown Label, that offers lower-priced apparel.

== History ==
Kuniko Kato decided to become a fashion designer in her final year of high school. She created Metamorphose in 1993, while she was attending vocational school. In 1997, Kato launched the brand as a company and opened its first store in Kyoto, Japan. The company moved to Osaka in 1998, opening a store there. In 1999, stores were opened in Nagoya and Tokyo. Since August 2002, Metamorphose temps de fille had an English version of their website and allowed people outside of Japan to purchase their clothing.

== See also ==
- Lolita fashion
