= Gothic & Lolita Bible =

Japanese magazine and book

- The cover of the first English-language volume as published by Tokyopop in February 2008 in North America
- Editor: Jenna Winterberg, Michelle Nguyen
- Frequency: Quarterly
- Circulation: 100,000 (2008)
- Founder: Mariko Suzuki
- Founded: 2001
- Final issue: 2017
- Company: Index Communications (1-49); Jack Media (50); J-International (51-63); Tokyopop (English edition)
- Country: Japan
- Based in: Tokyo
- Language: Japanese

Gothic & Lolita Bible (ゴシック&ロリータバイブル, Goshikku ando Rorīta Baiburu) was a quarterly Japanese fashion mook which focuses on the Gothic and Lolita fashions. It was first published in 2001 by Index Communications, and is a spin-off of the Japanese fashion magazine Kera.

In February 2008, an English-language version was released in North America by Tokyopop. English-language critics praised the Gothic & Lolita Bible as an entertaining magazine with nice pictures and content. It was discontinued after 5 issues in Spring 2009.

== History ==
First published in 2001 by Index Communications, the Gothic & Lolita Bible is a spin-off of the Japanese fashion magazine Kera. The "mook" was created by former Kera editor Mariko Suzuki. The Japanese musician Mana originally proposed the creation of the Gothic & Lolita Bible and along with Kana, a Japanese singer-songwriter, helped to promote the magazine and the Lolita fashion by dressing in the fashion while performing. Essays by Japanese author Takemoto Novala about "the proper behavior and attitudes" of girls also influenced many to join the Lolita fashion and lifestyle. Most of the Gothic & Lolita Bible focuses on the Lolita fashion as it is "the more popular of the two fashions".

The idea of publishing the Gothic & Lolita Bible in North America was first suggested in 2003. In June 2007, Tokyopop announced the decision to publish an English-language version and released the first volume in February 2008. It contained articles from past issues, which the editors chose based on available material, and original content. Beginning with the second volume, the English-language Gothic & Lolita Bible features articles, short stories, and interviews that originally ran in the Japanese version a year ago, along with original content about the fashion, events, and trends in the United States.

== Reception ==
Gothic & Lolita Bible ranked tenth in About.com's 2008 reader poll for the best manga magazine or magazine and book hybrids and was ranked by About.com's Deb Aoki as 2008's eleventh most anticipated manga. It received positive reviews from English-language critics. Active Anime's Sandra Scholes wrote: "Superb, this is an essential buy for any Lolita's bookshelf!" While noting it as "dated" content and not "a serious scholarly journal", Danielle Van Gorder of Mania Entertainment praised the magazine as a "gorgeous glossy mook that should satisfy both the casual fan of lolita fashion as well as the most discriminating sweet lolita princess." Writing for Coolstreak Cartoons, Leroy Douresseaux commented on the "lovely photographs" of the Gothic and Lolita models and called it "a photographic art mook from "The Twilight Zone" via A Clockwork Orange, Dangerous Liaisons, Mad Max, etc." In March 2017, Gothic & Lolita Bible announced they would be going on hiatus May 24, 2017 after 16 years of publication.

== Issues ==
=== Japanese language edition ===
There were a total of 63 regular issues and 5 special issues.

Issue	Publication date*	ISBN
#1	2001; April 21, 2007 (Premium reprint)	ISBN 4894614170; ISBN 978-4894614178
#2	July 18, 2001	ISBN 4860480015; ISBN 978-4860480011
#3	December 1, 2001; January 10, 2002*	ISBN 4860480163; ISBN 978-4860480165
#4	April 30, 2002; June 13, 2002*	ISBN 4860480392; ISBN 978-4860480394
#5	July 29, 2002; September 5, 2002*	ISBN 4860480481; ISBN 978-4860480486
#6	October 7, 2002; November 16, 2002*	ISBN 4860480562; ISBN 978-4860480561
#7	December 11, 2002	ISBN 4860480678; ISBN 978-4860480677
#8	March 22, 2003; April 30, 2003*	ISBN 4860480775; ISBN 978-4860480776
#9	June 28, 2003	ISBN 4860480856; ISBN 978-4860480851
#10	September 29, 2003	ISBN 4860480961; ISBN 978-4860480967
#11	December 19, 2003	ISBN 4860481100; ISBN 978-4860481100
#12	March 12, 2004; April 9, 2004*	ISBN 4860481232; ISBN 978-4860481230
#13	May 28, 2004; June 23, 2004*	ISBN 4860481356; ISBN 978-4860481353
Hair & Makeup	August 31, 2004	ISBN 4860481518; ISBN 978-4860481513
#14	August 24, 2004	ISBN 4860481461; ISBN 978-4860481469
#15	November 25, 2004; December 22, 2004*	ISBN 4860481615; ISBN 978-4860481612
Extra #1	January 31, 2005	ISBN 4860481690; ISBN 978-4860481698
#16	February 24, 2005	ISBN 4860481720; ISBN 978-4860481728
#17	May 24, 2005	ISBN 4860481836; ISBN 978-4860481834
#18	August 24, 2005	ISBN 4860481933; ISBN 978-4860481933
#19	November 24, 2005; December 21, 2005*	ISBN 4757333099; ISBN 978-4757333093
#20	February 24, 2006	ISBN 475733317X; ISBN 978-4757333178
#21	May 30, 2006	ISBN 4757333323; ISBN 978-4757333321
Extra #2	June 24, 2006	ISBN 4757333366; ISBN 978-4757333369
#22	August 24, 2006	ISBN 4757333420; ISBN 978-4757333420
#23	November 24, 2006	ISBN 4757333544; ISBN 978-4757333543
#24	February 24, 2007	ISBN 4757333625; ISBN 978-4757333628
#25	May 24, 2007	ISBN 4757333749; ISBN 978-4757333741
#26	August 24, 2007; September 21, 2007*	ISBN 4757333838; ISBN 978-4757333833
#27	November 24, 2007	ISBN 4757333943; ISBN 978-4757333949
Boudoir	January 31, 2008	ISBN 4757334028; ISBN 978-4757334021
#28	February 21, 2008; March 23, 2008*	ISBN 4757334052; ISBN 978-4757334052
#29	May 24, 2008; June 21, 2008*	ISBN 4757333943; ISBN 978-4757334137
#30	August 22, 2008	ISBN 4757334222; ISBN 978-4757334229
#31	November 21, 2008; December 21, 2008*	ISBN 4757334281; ISBN 978-4757334281
#32	February 24, 2009; March 22, 2009*	ISBN 4757334346; ISBN 978-4757334342
#33	May 25, 2009	ISBN 4757334427; ISBN 978-4757334427
#34	August 24, 2009	ISBN 4757334486; ISBN 978-4757334489
#35	November 20, 2009; December 20, 2009*	ISBN 4757334540; ISBN 978-4757334540
Gothic & Lolita Ensemble	April 5, 2010	ISBN 486190563X; ISBN 978-4861905636
#36	April 10, 2010; May 8, 2010*	ISBN 4757334702; ISBN 978-4757334700
#37	August 24, 2010; September 20, 2010*	ISBN 4757334834; ISBN 978-4757334830
#38	November 24, 2010; December 20, 2010*	ISBN 4757334869; ISBN 978-4757334861
#39	February 24, 2011; March 24, 2011*	ISBN 4757334923; ISBN 978-4757334922
#40	May 24, 2011; June 20, 2011*	ISBN 475733494X; ISBN 978-4757334946
#41	August 24, 2011; September 21, 2011	ISBN 4757334958; ISBN 978-4757334953
#42	November 24, 2011; December 21, 2011*	ISBN 4757334982; ISBN 978-4757334984
#43	February 24, 2012	ISBN 4757335032; ISBN 978-4757335035
#44	May 24, 2012	ISBN 4757335059; ISBN 978-4757335059
#45	August 24, 2012	ISBN 4757335075; ISBN 978-4757335073
#46	November 24, 2012; December 21, 2012*	ISBN 4757335083; ISBN 978-4757335080
#47	February 23, 2013; March 23, 2013*	ISBN 4757335091; ISBN 978-4757335097
#48	May 24, 2013	ISBN 4757335113; ISBN 978-4757335110
#49	August 24, 2013	ISBN 4757335121; ISBN 978-4757335127
#50	November 25, 2013	ISBN 475733513X; ISBN 978-4757335134
#51	February 24, 2014	ISBN 4757335148; ISBN 978-4757335141
#52	May 23, 2014	ISBN 4757335156; ISBN 978-4757335158
#53	August 25, 2014	ISBN 4757335164; ISBN 978-4757335165
#54	November 25, 2014; December 21, 2014*	ISBN 4908158002; ISBN 978-4908158001
#55	February 24, 2015	ISBN 4908158029; ISBN 978-4908158025
#56	May 25, 2015; June 21, 2015*	ISBN 4908158037; ISBN 978-4908158032
#57	August 24, 2015	ISBN 4908158045; ISBN 978-4908158049
#58	November 24, 2015	ISBN 4908158053; ISBN 978-4908158056
#59	February 24, 2016	ISBN 490815807X; ISBN 978-4908158070
#60	May 24, 2016	ISBN 4908158096; ISBN 978-4908158094
#61	August 24, 2016	ISBN 4908158118; ISBN 978-4908158117
#62	November 24, 2016	ISBN 4908158126; ISBN 978-4908158124
#63	February 24, 2017	ISBN 4908158134; ISBN 978-4908158131

- Many times there are differences between the release date from the publisher's website and the publication date printed on the issue itself. Dates marked with a * are dates printed on the back cover of the issue.

=== English language edition ===
Issue	Publication date	ISBN
#1	February 12, 2008	ISBN 1427803471; ISBN 978-1427803474
#2	June 17, 2008	ISBN 142780348X; ISBN 978-1427803481
#3	September 16, 2008	ISBN 1427803498; ISBN 978-1427803498
#4	December 9, 2008	ISBN 1427803501; ISBN 978-1427803504
#5	April 1, 2009	ISBN 142780351X; ISBN 978-1427803511
