= Kana Garden (Hiratsuka, Japan) =

Botanical Garden in Japan

Coordinates: 35°21′30.8″N 139°18′42.5″E

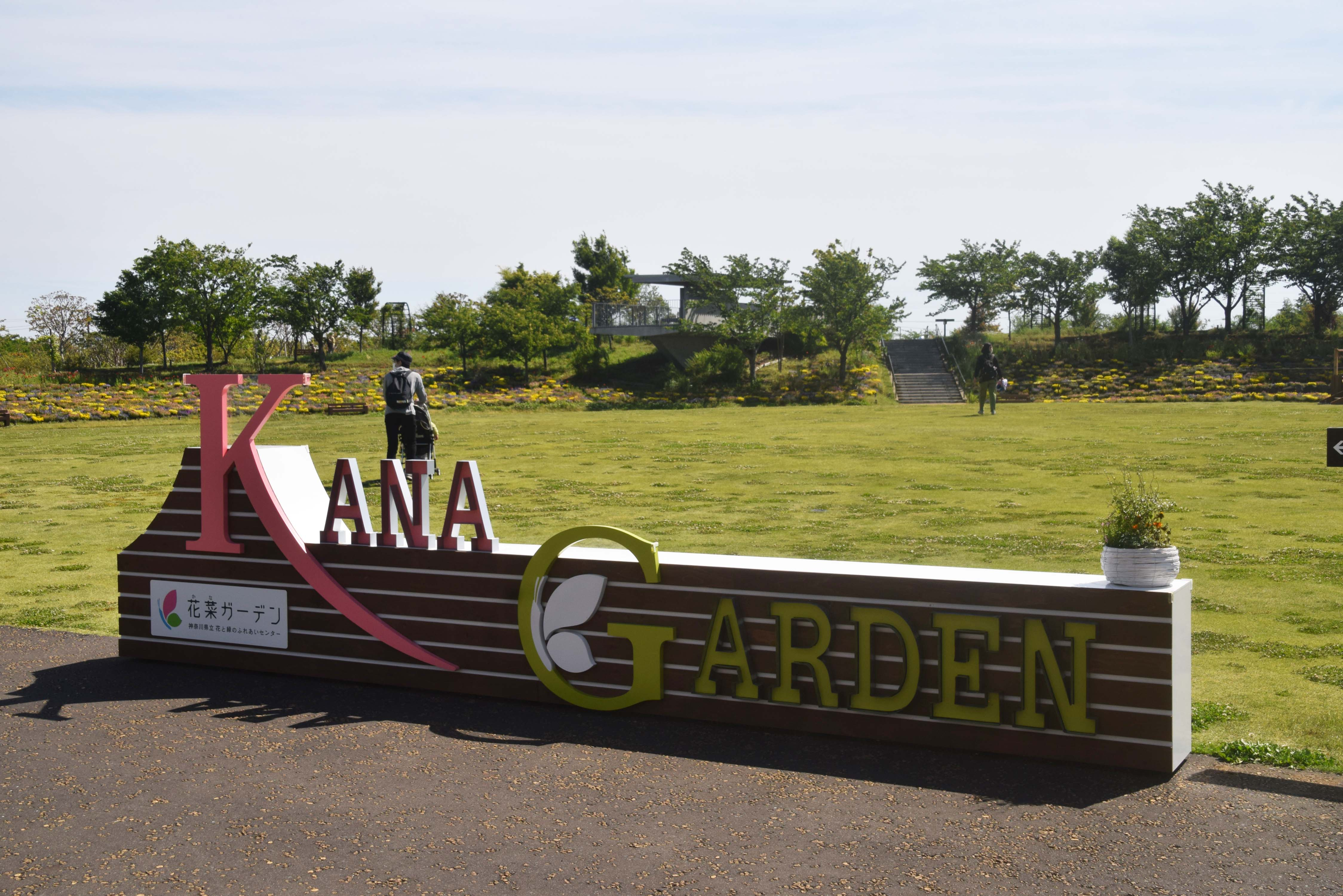
The entrance to the flowers and vegetables field of Kana Garden, in Hiratsuka, Kanagawa, Japan

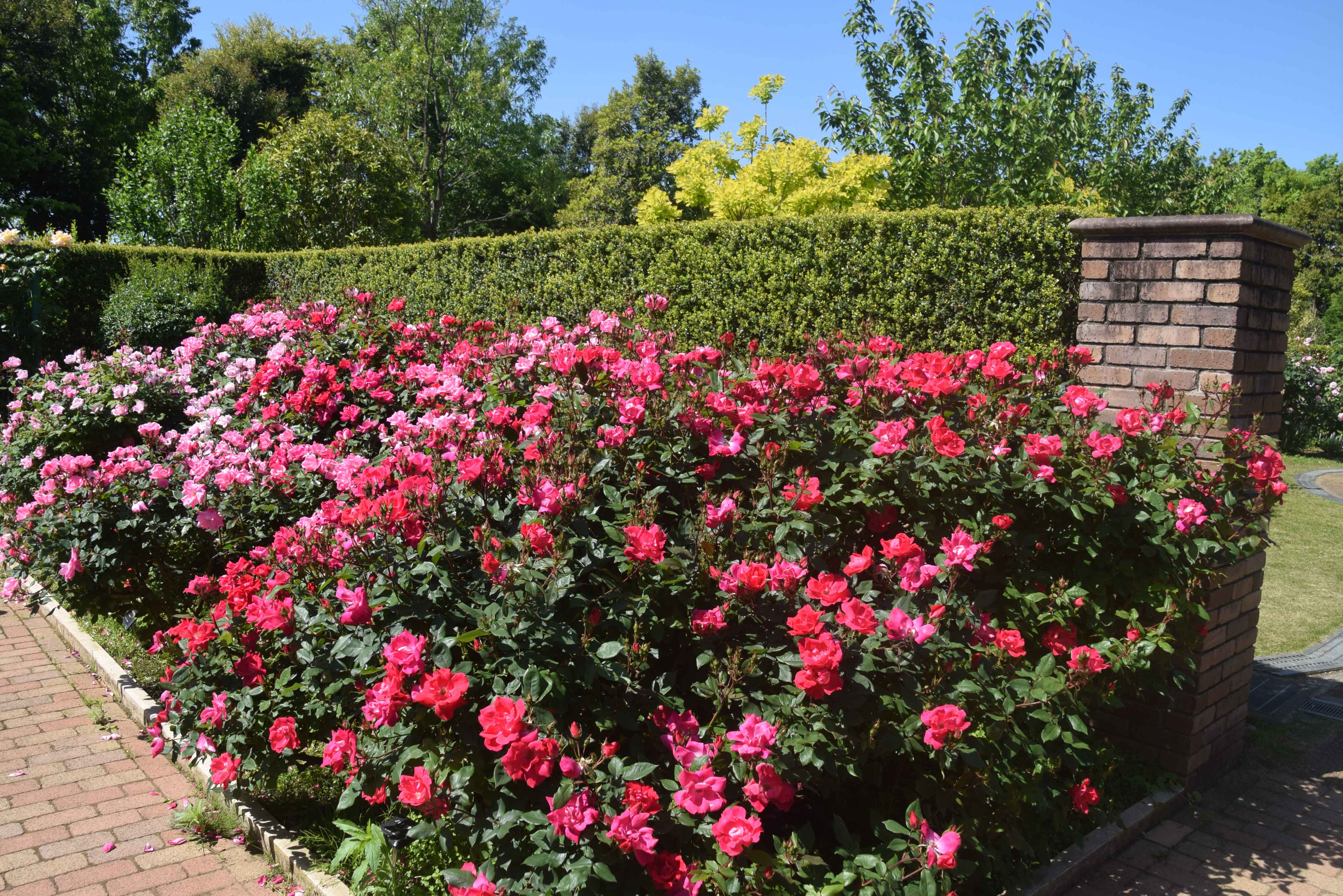
The roses are in full bloom in early May, at Kana Garden.

Kana Garden (Japanese: 花菜ガーデン), with its official name of Kanagawa Prefectural Center for Close Contact with Flowers and Greenery translated into English, is a botanical garden located in Teradanawa, Hiratsuka, Kanagawa, Japan.

== In general ==
Kana Garden was built on the site of the former Kanagawa Prefectural Agricultural Research Institute and opened on March 1, 2010. It was constructed and is managed by Kanagawa GA Partners, a special purpose company of Oriental Land Group's Green and Arts Company, using the PFI arrangement. The total area is 92,000 square meters.

The garden's official name is Prefectural Center for Close Contact with Flowers and Greenery (Japanese: 神奈川県立花と緑のふれあいセンター 花菜ガーデン). Kana Garden is its nickname, from "Ka" (Japanese: 花, meaning flower), "Na" (菜, vegetable) and "Garden" (ガーデン, garden), which was selected as the result of people's naming competition.

The concept of the park is based on the life of Karel Čapek, the Czech writer and horticulturist, and proposes to add "horticulture" to daily life. For this reason, there is also an exhibition in the park that resembles the existing Karel Čapek and Garden in Prague, the Czech Republic. Kana Garden is especially famous for its rose garden.

Many volunteer "supporters" work on the maintenance of this park.

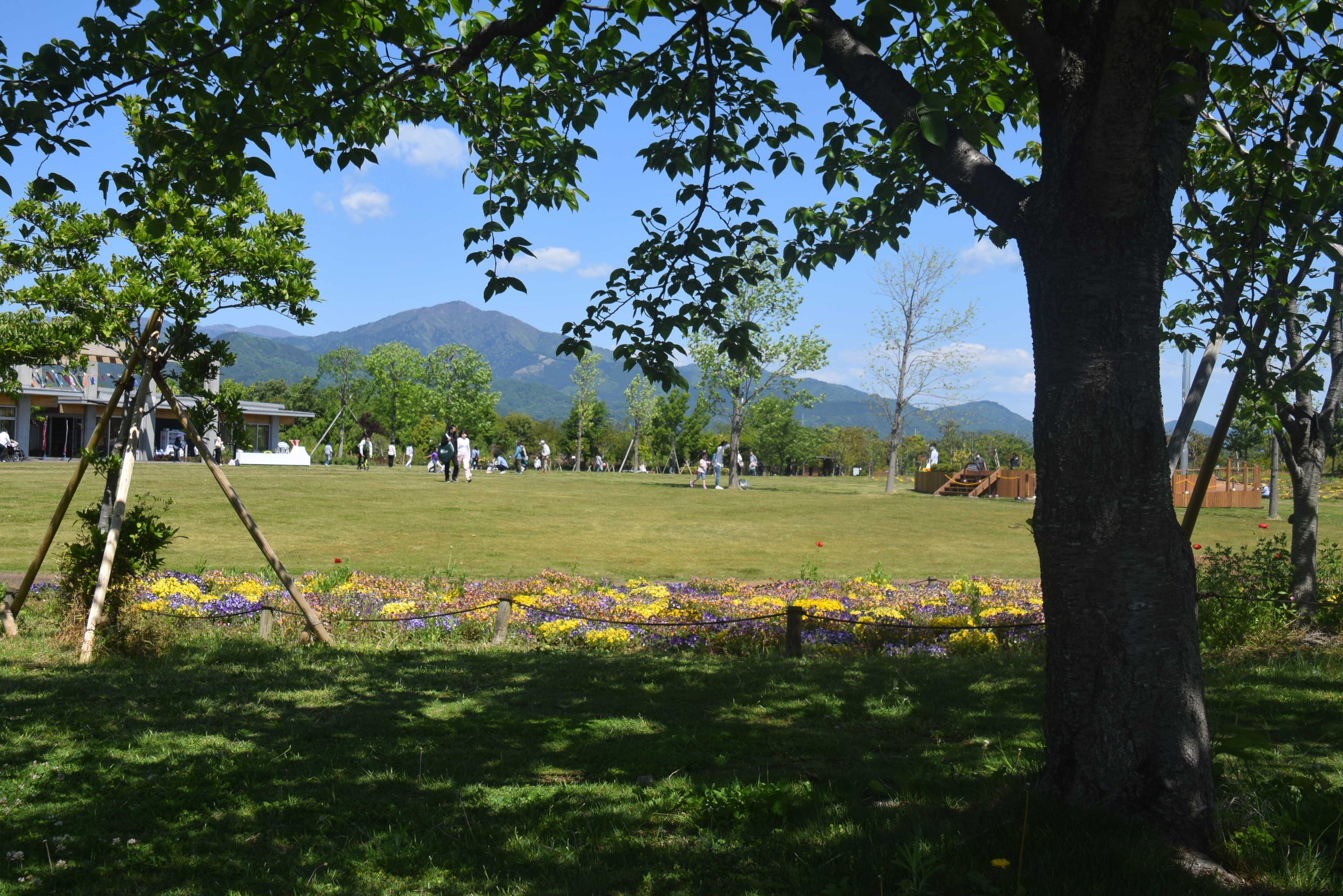
Mount Ōyama, northward in Kana Garden, Hiratsuka, Japan

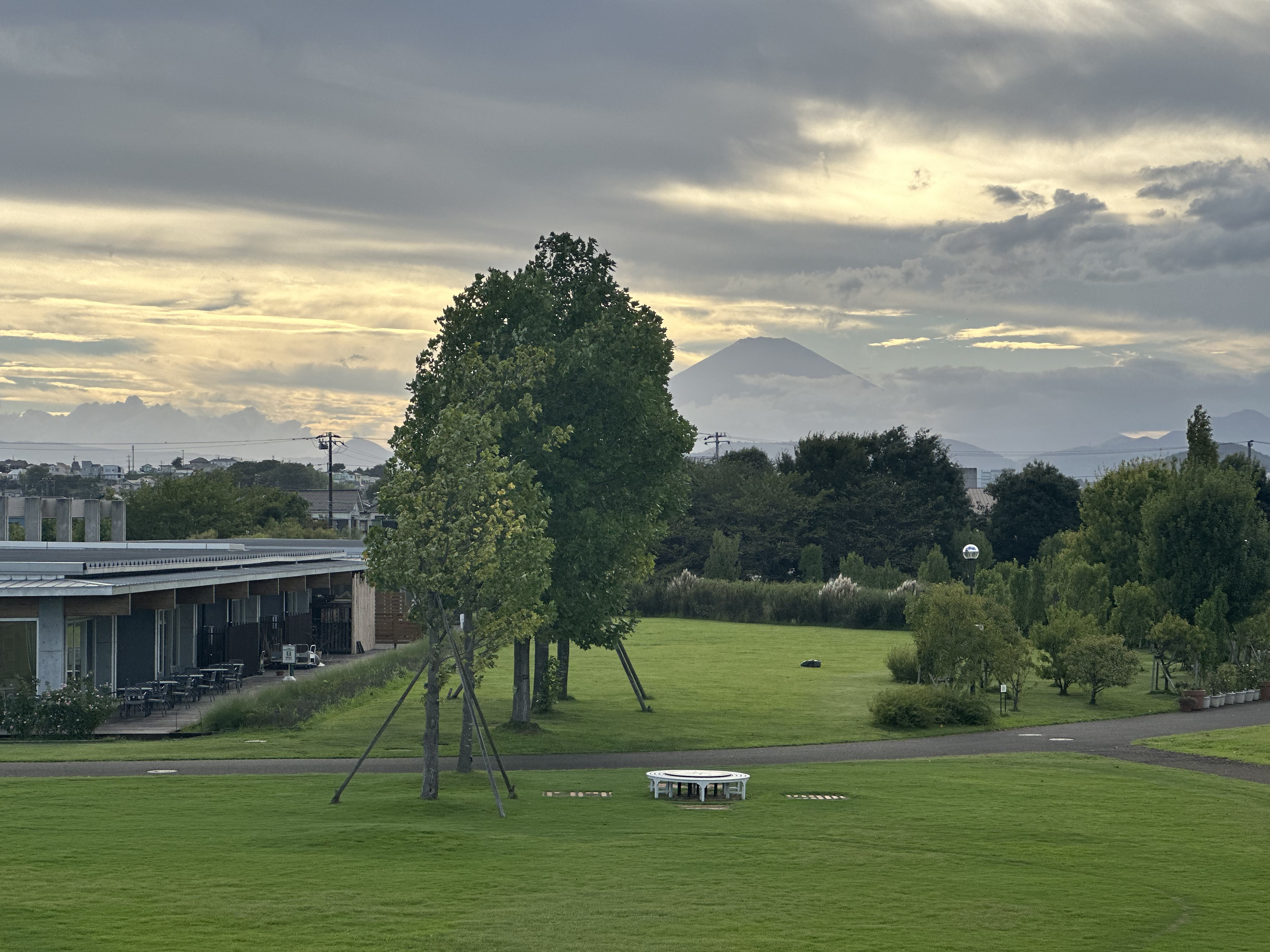
Mount Fuji, westward in Kana Garden, Hiratsuka, Japan

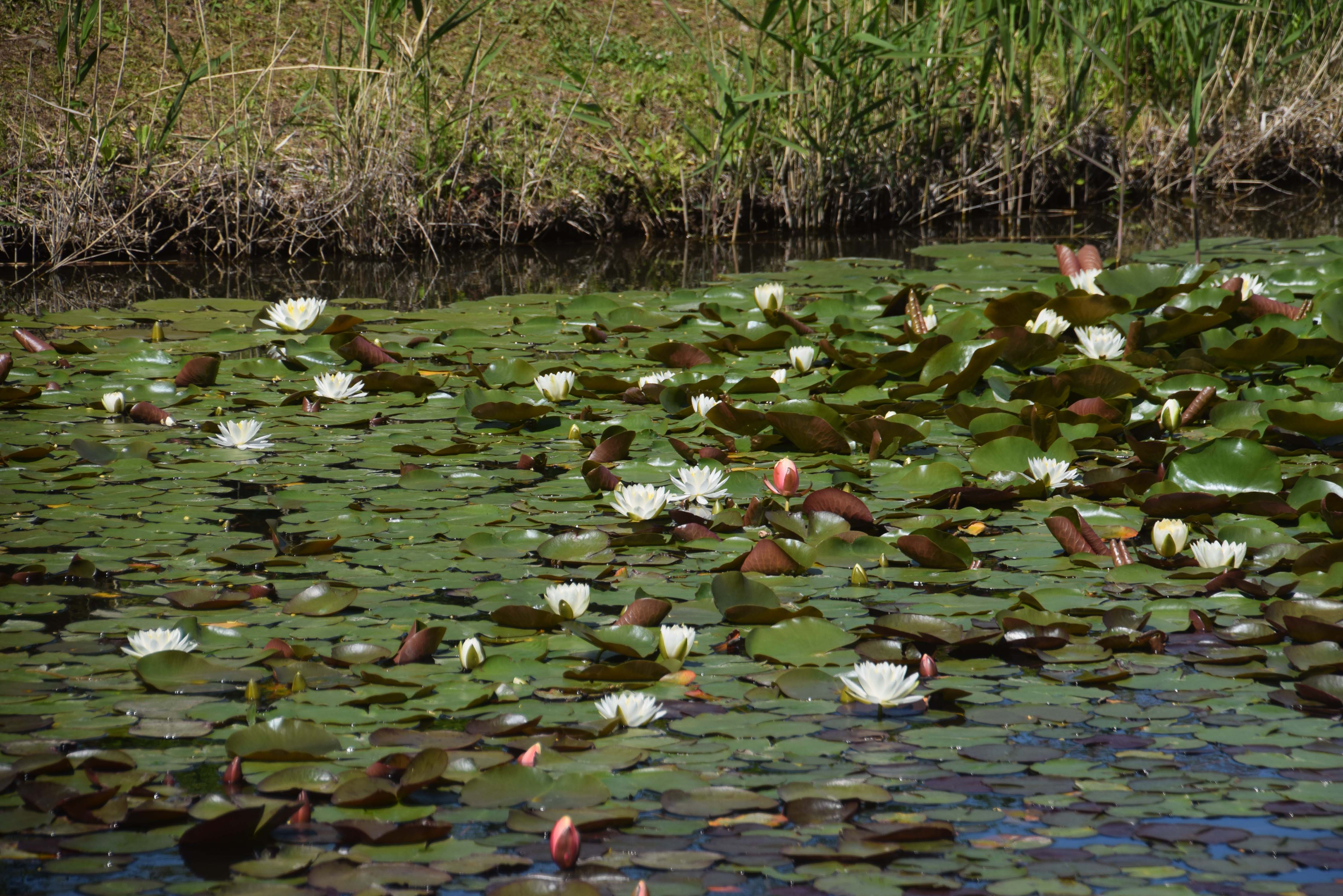
A pond of water lilies and lotuses

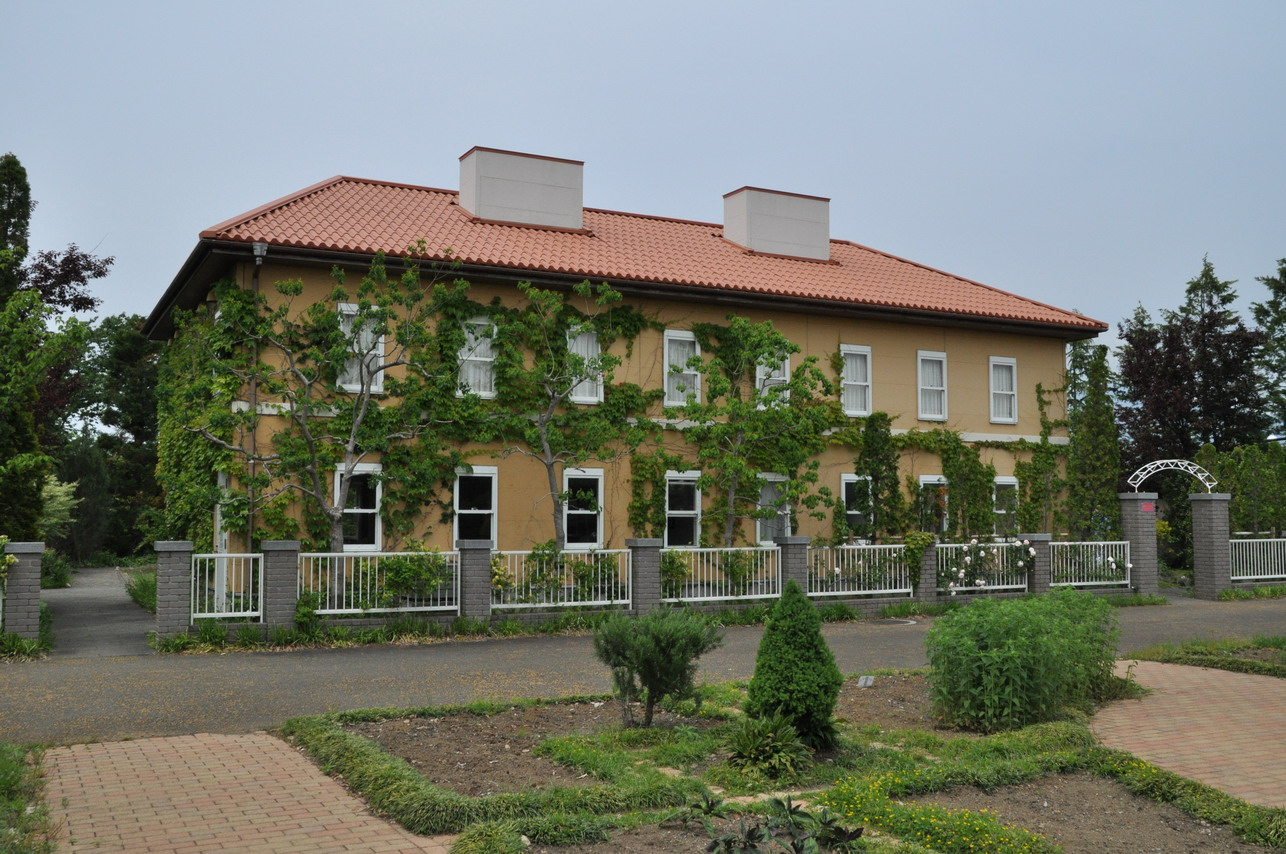
The Karel Čapek House

== Transportation ==
Kana Garden is off Hiratsuka Interchange (平塚インターチェンジ) of Odawara-Atsugi Road. For public transportation, take a bus at Hiratsuka Station on the JR Tokaido Main Line (20 minutes) or at Hadano Station on the Odakyu Electric Railway’s Odawara Line (25 minutes), get off at Hiratsuka Yogogakko (神奈川県立平塚養護学校) bus stop, and walk five minutes.

== See also ==
- Kanagawa Prefecture's visitor attractions and places of interest
- Hiratsuka City's tourist attractions
