= Bombing of Hiratsuka in World War II =

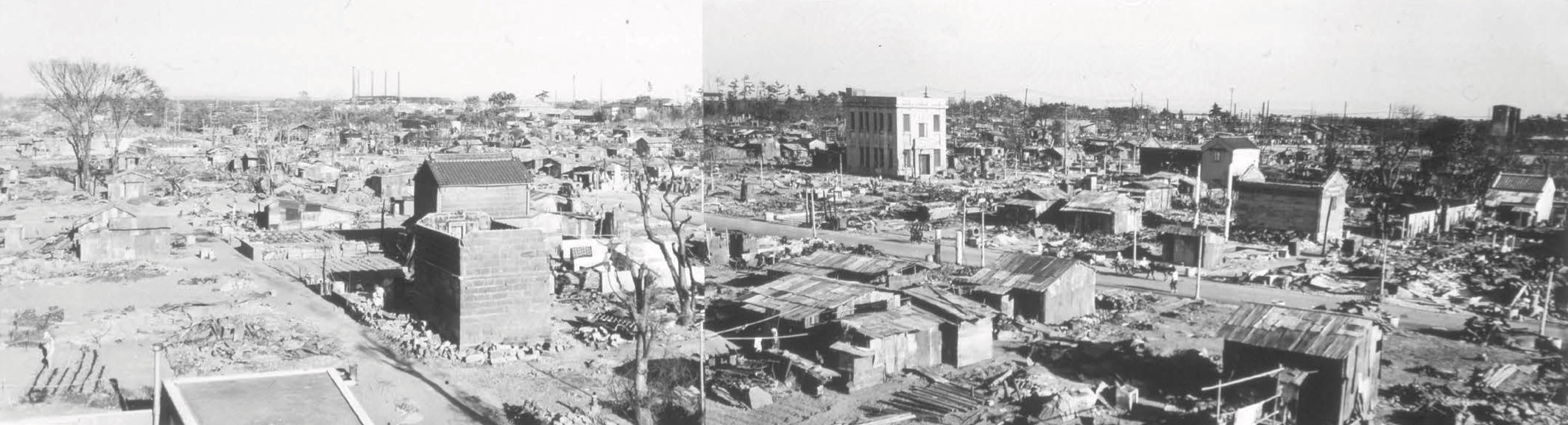
Hiratsuka after the 1945 air raid

The bombing of Hiratsuka (平塚大空襲, Hiratsuka dai-kūshū) was part of the strategic bombing air raids on Japan campaign waged by the United States against military and civilian targets and population centers during the Japan home islands campaign in the closing stages of the Pacific War.

== Background ==
Although the city of Hiratsuka was not a major population center, it had two major targets of military significance: the Hiratsuka Navy Ammunitions Arsenal (平塚海軍火薬廠) and Japan International Aircraft Industries (日本国際航空工業), a Nissan group military aircraft production factory, both located to the north of the city center. The Tōkaidō Main Line railway connecting Tokyo with Osaka also ran through the city, which was designated as one of the primary landing beaches in the projected invasion of the Japanese home islands by Allied ground forces.

== Air raids ==
Despite its obvious military significance, Hiratsuka was not bombed until the very late stages of the war. The first major air raid occurred on the night of July 16, 1945. During this attack, 138 B-29 Superfortress bombers of the USAAF 20th Air Force, 314th Bombardment Wing dropped a total of 1163 tons incendiary bombs on the city, destroying most of the city center. However, only 5% of the capacity of the Imperial Japanese Navy Ammunition Arsenal was affected, and only 10% of the capacity of the Nissan aircraft factory, as the bombing was concentrated on Hiratsuka's civilian population center, rather than the military industries located on the outskirts of town. The estimated civilian casualties were 228 people killed.

A year after the war, the United States Army Air Forces's Strategic Bombing Survey (Pacific War) reported that 44.8 percent of the city had been totally destroyed.

Following the July 16 air raid, the United States Navy launched another attack with 16 SB2C Helldivers and 24 F4U Corsairs launched from the USS Wasp, USS Shangri La and USS Yorktown on July 30, 1945. This attack was directed specifically at the production facilities of Nissan aircraft. Eighteen 500 lb bombs were dropped on Buildings 2, 6 and 7 of the plant, killing 25 workers, mostly schoolchildren who had been conscripted as labor.

This raid was followed on August 13 by another attack involving 61 aircraft launched from USS Hancock, USS Belleau Wood, USS Bennington, USS Lexington and USS San Jacinto. The primary target was again the Nissan aircraft production facilities, by this time virtually abandoned due to lack of materials and damage in the previous air raid.

== See also ==
- Air raids on Japan
- Evacuations of civilians in Japan during World War II
