= Tōkaidaigaku-mae Station =

Railway station in Hadano, Kanagawa Prefecture, Japan

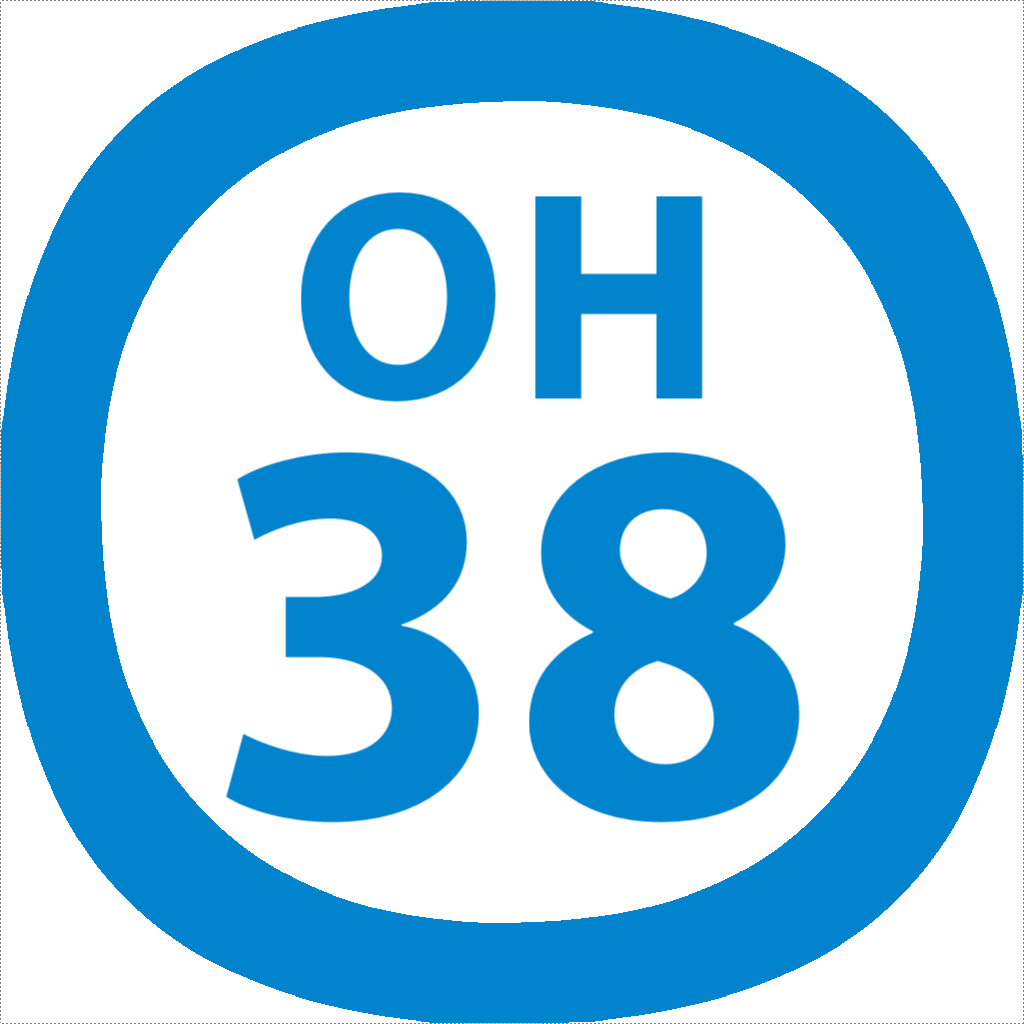
Tōkaidaigaku-mae Station 東海大学前駅

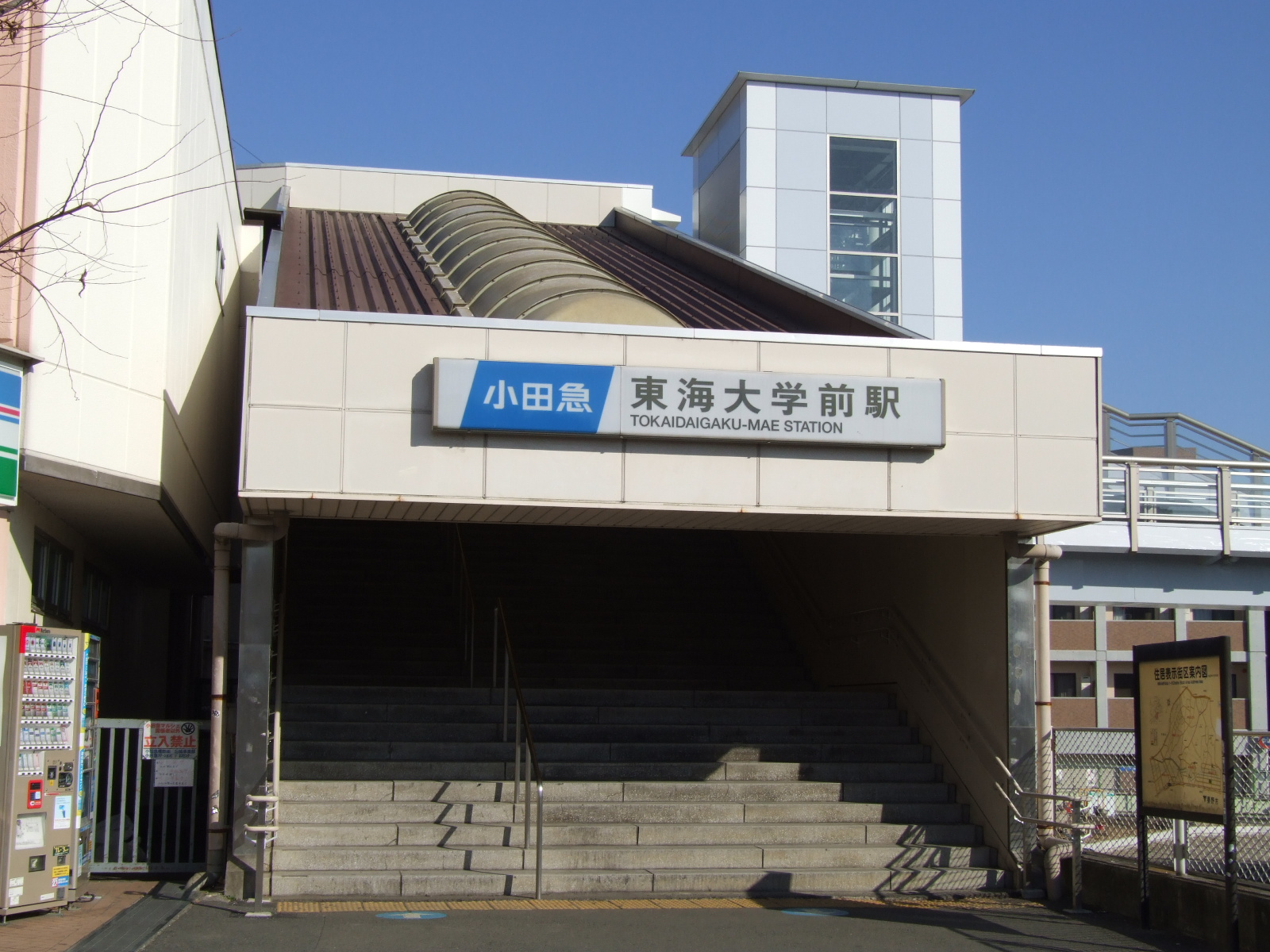
- South Exit of Tōkaidaigaku-mae Station

General information
- Location: 1-1-1 Minamiyana, Hadano-shi, Kanagawa-ken 257-0003; Japan
- Coordinates: 35.3731297°N 139.2712355°E
- Operator: Odakyu Electric Railway
- Line: ■ Odakyu Odawara Line
- Distance: 57.0 km from Shinjuku
- Platforms: 2 side platforms
- Connections: Bus terminal

Other information
- Status: Staffed
- Station code: OH-38
- Website: Official website

History
- Opened: 1 April 1927; 99 years ago
- Former names: Ōne (until 1987)

Passengers
- FY2019: 38,909 daily

Services
Preceding station	Odakyu	Following station
Hadano towards Odawara	Odawara Line Rapid Express	Tsurumaki-Onsen towards Shinjuku
Hadano towards Odawara	Odawara Line Express Local	Tsurumaki-Onsen towards Shinjuku or Yoyogi-Uehara
Location
- Location within Kanagawa Prefecture Location within Japan

Tōkaidaigaku-mae Station (東海大学前駅, Tōkaidaigaku-mae-eki) is a passenger railway station located in the city of Hadano, Kanagawa Prefecture, Japan. The station operated by the private railway operator Odakyu Electric Railway. As its name (literally "in front of Tokai University") implies, the station is located close to the Shōnan campus of Tokai University.

== Lines ==
Tōkaidaigaku-mae Station is served by the Odakyu Odawara Line. It is located 57.0 rail km from the line's Tokyo terminal at Shinjuku Station.

== Station layout ==
The station has two opposed side platforms serving two tracks, with the station building is constructed on a cantilever above the platforms and tracks.

=== Platforms ===
1	■ Odakyu Odawara Line	for Shin-Matsuda and Odawara
2	■ Odakyu Odawara Line	for Sagami-Ono, Shin-Yurigaoka, and Shinjuku; Tokyo Metro Chiyoda Line for Ayase

== History ==
The station opened on 1 April 1927, as Ōne Station (大根駅). It was given its present name on 9 March 1987, and the current station building was completed the same year.

Station numbering was introduced in January 2014 with Tōkaidaigaku-mae being assigned station number OH38.

== Passenger statistics ==
In fiscal 2019, the station was used by an average of 38,909 passengers daily.

The passenger figures for previous years are as shown below.

Fiscal year	daily average
2005	38,311
2010	38,078
2015	41,131

== Surrounding area ==
- Tōkai University Shōnan Campus
- Ōne Elementary School
- Hirohata Elementary School
- Ōne Junior High School
- Kanagawa Prefectural Hadano High School

== See also ==
- List of railway stations in Japan
