= Hadano =

Hadano 秦野市
- City
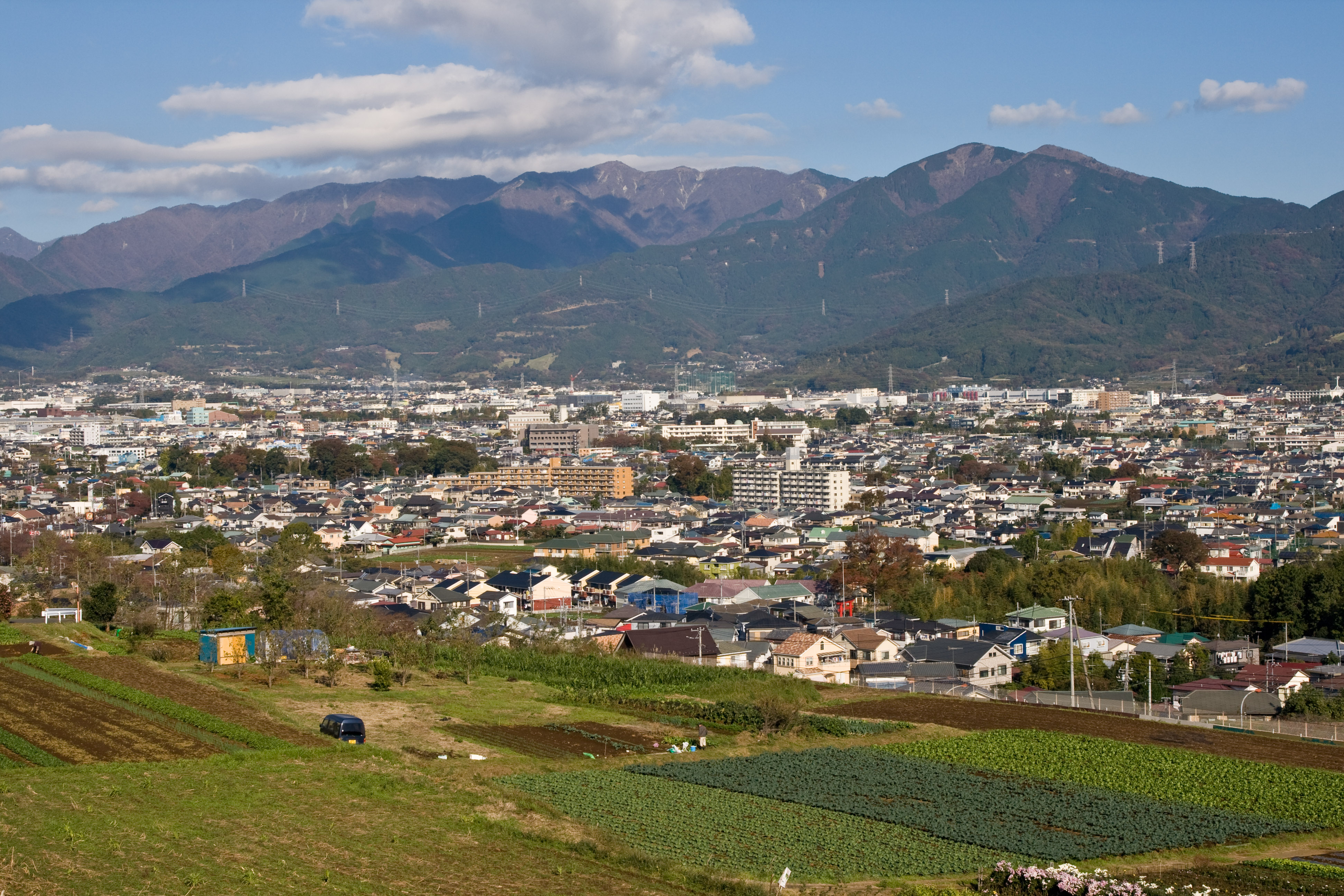
- Panorama view of Hadano Basin and Tanzawa Mountain Range

- Flag Seal

- Location of Hadano in Kanagawa Prefecture

- Coordinates: 35°22′N 139°13′E
- Country: Japan
- Region: Kantō
- Prefecture: Kanagawa

Government
  - Mayor: Masakazu Takahashi (since 2018)

Area
  - Total: 103.76 km^{2} (40.06 sq mi)

Population (1 June 2021)
  - Total: 163,787
  - Density: 1,578.5/km^{2} (4,088.3/sq mi)
- Time zone: UTC+9 (Japan Standard Time)
- Symbols
  - Tree: Camellia sasanqua and Magnolia kobus
  - Flower: Hydrangea and Dianthus
  - Bird: Japanese bush-warbler
- Phone number: 0463-82-5111
- Address: 1-3-2 Sakuracho, Hadano-shi, Kanagawa-ken 257-0003
- Website: Official website

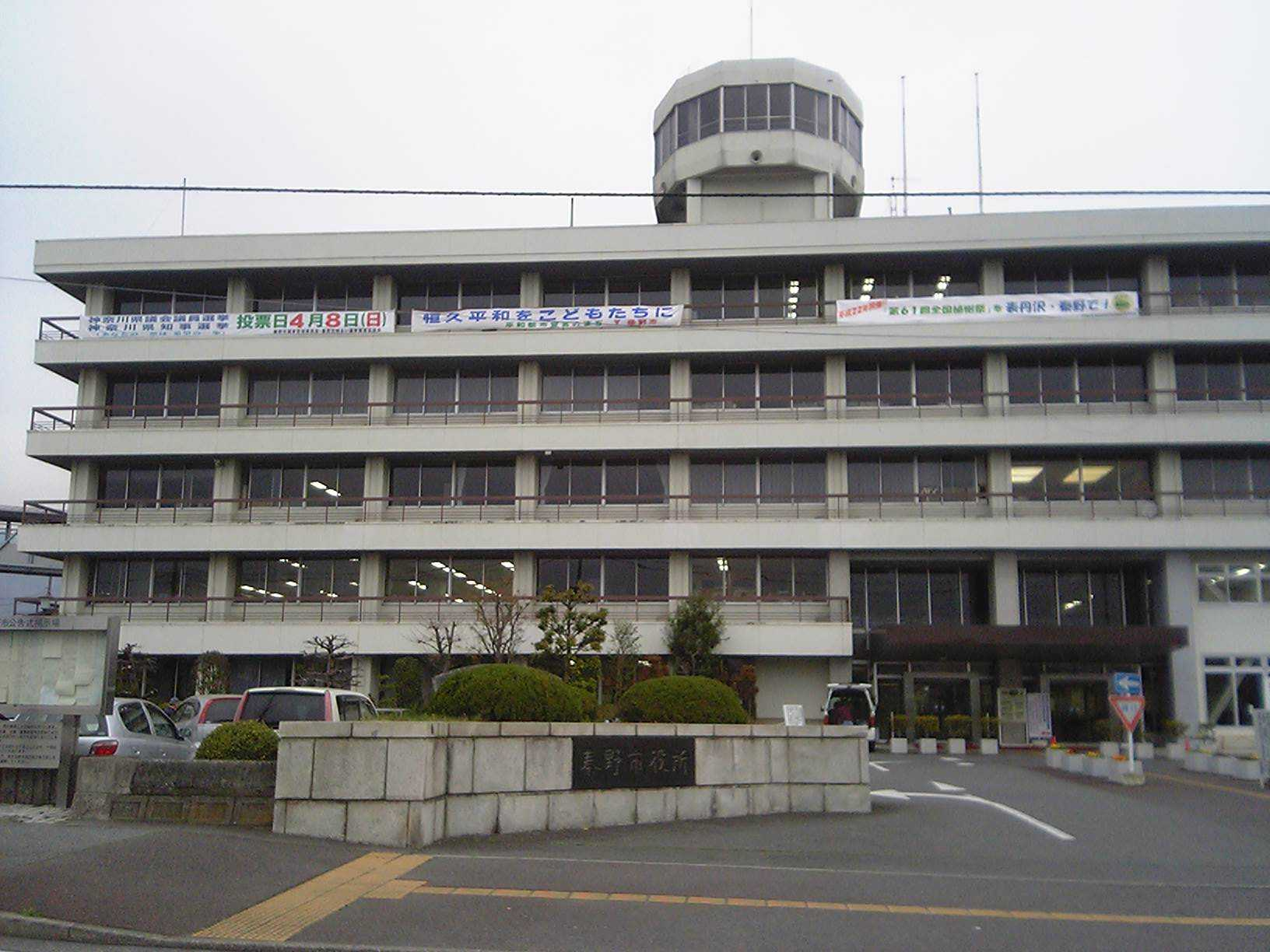
Hadano City Hall

Hadano (秦野市, Hadano-shi) is a city in Kanagawa Prefecture, Japan. As of 1 June 2021, the city had an estimated population of 163,787 and a population density of 1600 persons per km^{2}. The total area of the city is 103.76 square kilometres (40.06 sq mi).

== Geography ==
Hadano is located in the foothills of the Tanzawa Mountains in west-central Kanagawa Prefecture and is approximately 12.8 kilometers north-to-south by 13.6 kilometers east-to west. About half of the city area is within the borders of the Tanzawa-Ōyama Quasi-National Park.

=== Surrounding municipalities ===
Kanagawa Prefecture

- Atsugi
- Hiratsuka
- Kiyokawa
- Isehara
- Nakai
- Ōi
- Yamakita

=== Climate ===
Hadano has a humid subtropical climate (Köppen Cfa) characterized by warm summers and cool winters with light to no snowfall. The average annual temperature in Hadano is 13.4 °C. The average annual rainfall is 1906 mm with September as the wettest month. The temperatures are highest on average in August, at around 24.2 °C, and lowest in January, at around 2.9 °C.

== Demographics ==
Per Japanese census data, the population of Hadano grew rapidly during the late 20th century and has plateaued in the 21st.

Historical population
| Year | Pop. | ±% |
|---|---|---|
| 1950 | 49,638 | — |
| 1960 | 51,285 | +3.3% |
| 1970 | 75,226 | +46.7% |
| 1980 | 123,133 | +63.7% |
| 1990 | 155,620 | +26.4% |
| 2000 | 168,142 | +8.0% |
| 2010 | 170,145 | +1.2% |
| 2020 | 162,439 | −4.5% |

== History ==
The name "Hadano" appears as a geographic term in the Heian period Wamyō Ruijushō, as "Hatano", and there has been scholarly speculation as to possible connections with the Nara period Hata clan. From the late Heian period until the Kamakura period, the area was divided into shōen controlled by descendants of Fujiwara no Hidesato, including the Sengoku-period daimyō, the Hatano clan. During the Edo period, it was nominally part of Odawara Domain, although large portions were tenryō territory controlled by the shōgun in Edo through various hatamoto.

After the Meiji Restoration and with the establishment of the district system in 1878, the area came under the control of Ōsumi District (大住郡, Ōsumi-gun) and became Hadano town on 1 April 1889 with the creation of the modern municipalities system. On 26 March 1896, Ōsumi District and Yurugi District were merged to form Naka District. The town began to experience rapid growth after the opening of the Odakyu Electric Railway in 1927. Hadano became a city on 1 January 1955, through the merger of former towns of Hadano and Minamihadano with the villages of Kitahadano and Higashihadano. The new city annexed neighboring the village of One, and the village of Kamihatano (from Ashigarakami District) later the same year, and annexed the town of Nishihadano in 1964.

== Government ==
Hadano has a mayor-council form of government with a directly elected mayor and a unicameral city council of 24 members. Hadano contributes two members to the Kanagawa Prefectural Assembly. In terms of national politics, the city is part of Kanagawa 17th district of the lower house of the Diet of Japan.

== Economy ==
Hadano was a regional commercial center during the Edo period following the introduction of tobacco cultivation to the area. The curtains closed on the industry's 300-year history in 1984, and the local farmers have largely converted to production of green tea and ornamental flowers. A former tobacco-trading center and processing plant belonging to Japan Tobacco and Salt Public Corporation (now Japan Tobacco) has been replaced by a large shopping mall.

== Education ==
Hadano has 13 public elementary schools and nine public middle schools operated by the city government. The city has three public high schools operated by the Kanagawa Prefectural Board of Education, and the prefecture also operates one special education school for the handicapped. A private junior college, the Sophia Junior College is located within Hadano.

== Transportation ==
=== Railway ===
Odakyu Electric Railway – Odakyū Odawara Line

- Tsurumaki-Onsen - Tōkaidaigaku-mae - Hadano - Shibusawa

=== Highways ===
- Tōmei Expressway Hadano-Nakai Interchange
- National Route 246, to central Tokyo and Numazu
- National Route 255, to Odawara

== Local attractions ==
- Hadano Castle ruins
- Mount Ōyama
- Sakuradote Kofun Park
- Tanzawa Mountains
- Tsurumaki Hot Spring
- Cirno Museum

== Sister cities ==
- General Santos, Soccsksargen, Philippines
- Paju, Gyeonggi-do, South Korea
- Pasadena, Texas, United States
- Suwa, Nagano, Japan

== Notable people from Hadano ==
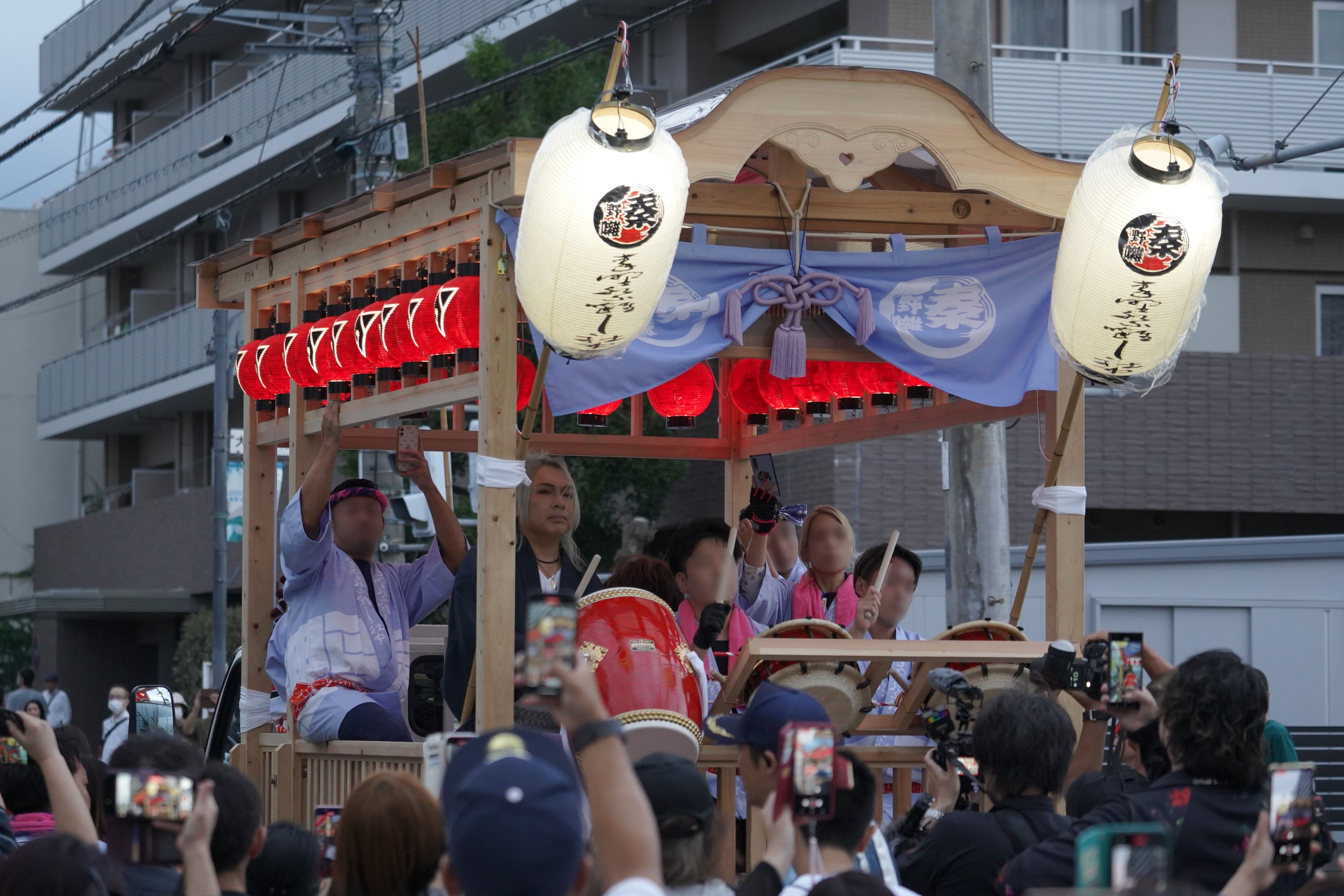
Hadano Hometown Ambassador Shinya playing a drum during the 77th Hadano Tobacco Festival, 2024

- Inoran – musician, singer-songwriter and rhythm guitarist of the rock band Luna Sea
- Masakazu Imanari – mixed martial artist
- Kyōhei Ishiguro – anime director
- J – musician, singer-songwriter and bass guitarist of the rock band Luna Sea
- Ryosuke Kawano – football player
- Rinko Kikuchi – actress
- Naoki Kobayashi – sprinter
- Yūgure Maeda – poet
- Izumi Sakai – singer-songwriter and vocalist of the pop rock group Zard; originally from Hiratsuka, Kanagawa
- Shinya – musician, media personality, entrepreneur and drummer of the rock band Luna Sea
- Sugizo – musician, singer-songwriter, lead guitarist and violinist of the rock band Luna Sea
