= Tokai University Junior College of Nursing and Technology =

Private junior college in Hiratsuka, Kanagawa, Japan

Coordinates: 35°21′41.41″N 139°16′24.19″E

- 東海大学医療技術短期大学
- Type: Private
- Established: 1974
- Location: Hiratsuka, Kanagawa, Japan
- Website: http://www.nmt.u-tokai.ac.jp/

Tokai University Junior College of Nursing and Technology (東海大学医療技術短期大学, Tōkai Daigaku Iryō Gijutsu Tanki Daigaku) is a private junior college in Hiratsuka, Kanagawa, Japan. The college was opened in 1974, and is affiliated with Tokai University.

== Departments ==
- Department of nursing

== Notable alumni ==
- Misako Aoki, model
