= Lemon Gas Stadium Hiratsuka =

Multi-purpose stadium in Hiratsuka, Kanagawa, Japan

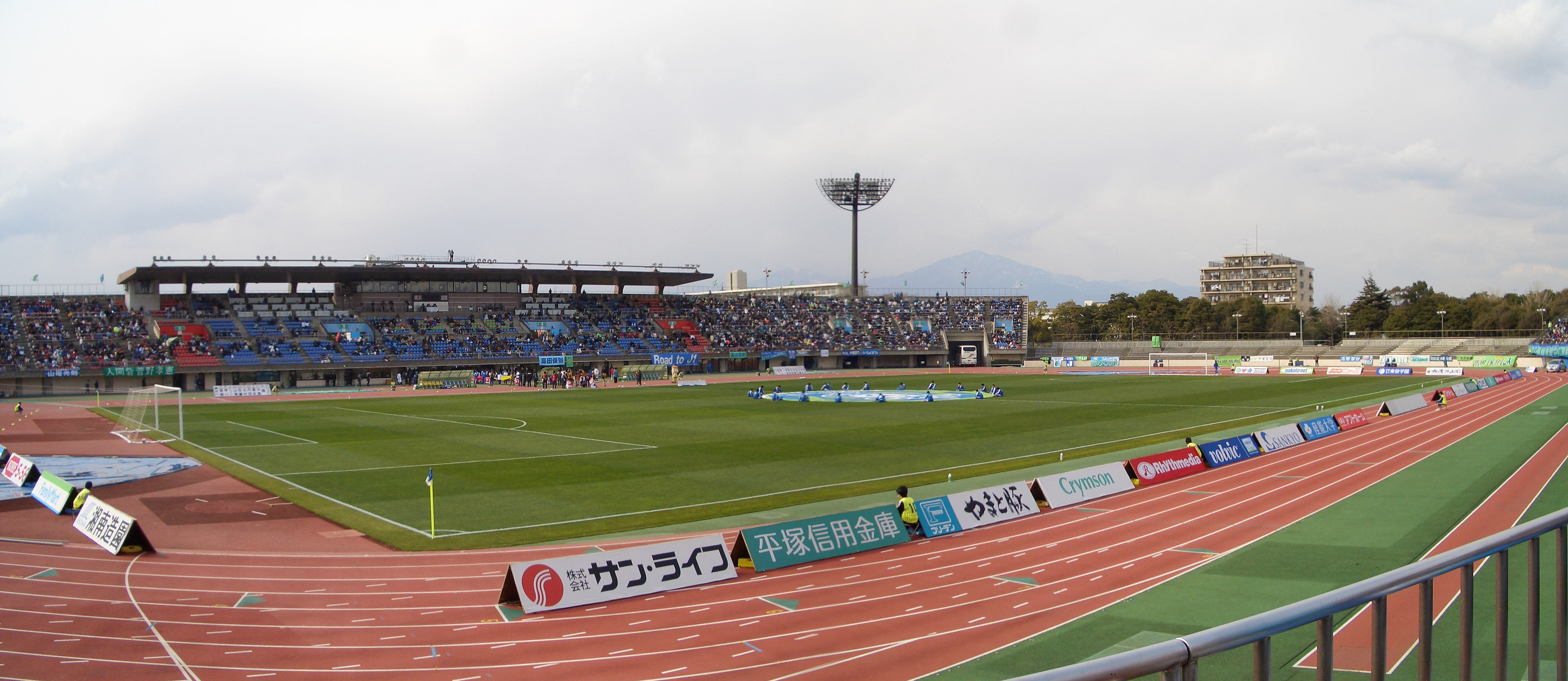
- Interactive map of Lemon Gas Stadium Hiratsuka
- Former names: Hiratsuka Stadium (1987–2012); Shonan BMW Stadium Hiratsuka (2012–2020)
- Location: Hiratsuka, Kanagawa, Japan
- Coordinates: 35°20′37″N 139°20′29″E
- Owner: Hiratsuka Citywide
- Capacity: 15,380
- Surface: Grass
- Field size: 107 x 71 m
- Public transit: JR East: Tokaido Main Line at Hiratsuka

Construction
- Opened: 1987
- Expanded: 1994

Tenant
- Shonan Bellmare

Lemon Gas Stadium Hiratsuka (Lemon Gas スタジアム平塚, Lemon Gas Stadium Hiratsuka) is a multi-purpose stadium in Hiratsuka, Kanagawa, Japan. It is used mostly for football matches and is the home stadium of Shonan Bellmare. The stadium has a capacity of 15,380 spectators.
