= Misako Aoki =

Japanese model

- 青木 美沙子
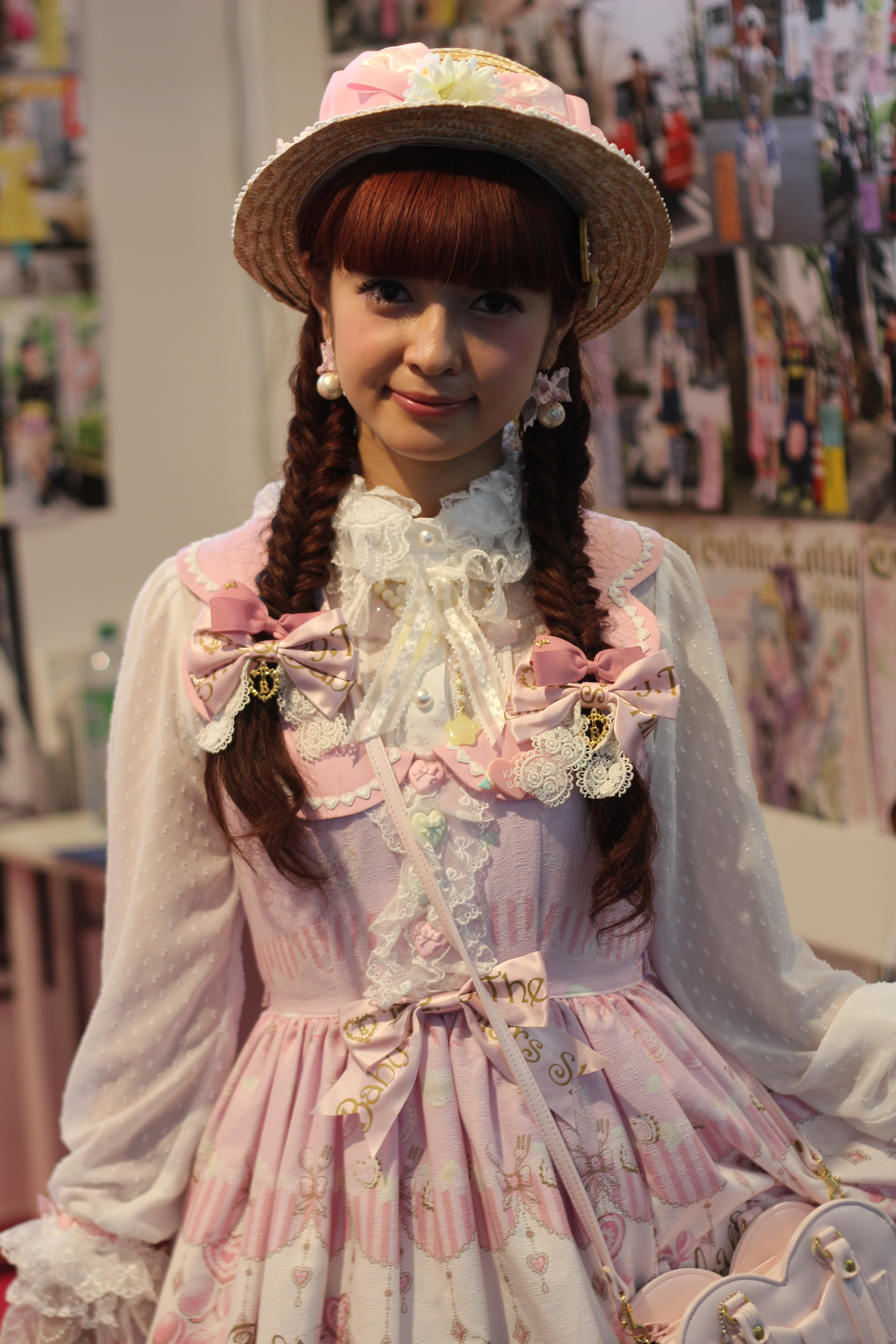
- Aoki at Japan Expo 2014
- Born: 3 June 1983 (age 43); Chiba Prefecture, Japan
- Education: Tokai University Junior College of Nursing and Technology
- Occupation: Model
- Years active: 1998–present
- Modeling information
- Agency: Twin Planet

Misako Aoki (Japanese: 青木 美沙子, Hepburn: Aoki Misako; born 3 June 1983) is a Japanese model represented by Twin Planet. Aoki gained fame as a model in the Japanese alternative fashion magazine Kera, particularly for lolita fashion. Since then, she has modeled for multiple lolita fashion brands and publications, including Baby, the Stars Shine Bright, Metamorphose temps de fille, and Gothic & Lolita Bible. She serves as the president of the Japan Lolita Association for lolita fashion.

== Career ==
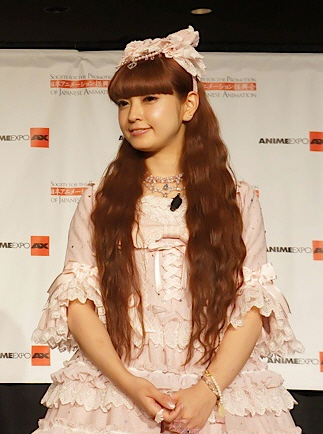
Aoki at Anime Expo 2012

Aoki was discovered as a model in Harajuku, Tokyo at the age of 15. While modeling for Kera magazine, she was given the opportunity to wear lolita fashion. Initially, Aoki was not a big fan of lolita fashion, but by modeling it, her confidence in wearing the fashion grew.

In 2009, Aoki was appointed by the Foreign Ministry to be a Kawaii Ambassador. Despite being initially embarrassed to utilize the title of Kawaii Ambassador, her fulfillment of her travel duties as an ambassador allowed her to discover how much kawaii has spread throughout the world. She emphasizes the word "kawaii" to describe lolita fashion. Wanting to promote lolita fashion worldwide, Omula Beauty Fashion College (大村美容ファッション専門学校, Ōmura Biyō Fasshon Senmon Gakkō) in Fukuoka established the Japan Lolita Association with Misako as head of the association in 2013. Aoki published a book in 2014 titled Lolita Fashion Book (ロリータファッションBOOK) deriving her experiences of wearing lolita fashion.

== Personal life ==
Aoki entered Tokai University Junior College of Nursing and Technology with the intention of practicing nursing. She divides her time between nursing and promoting lolita fashion.

== Bibliography ==
- Aoki, Misako. (2011). Misako Aoki no Kawaii Kakumei: Lolita Tokidoki Nurse (青木美沙子のカワイイ革命～ロリータときどきナース～, Aoki Misako no Kawaii Kakumei: Rorīta Tokidoki Nāsu). Tokyo: Takeshobo. ISBN 978-4812445938 (in Japanese)
- Aoki, Misako. (2014). Lolita Fashion Book (ロリータファッションBOOK). Tokyo: Mynavi. ISBN 978-4-8399-4911-2 (in Japanese)
- Aoki, Misako. (2023). Massugu Lolita-dō (まっすぐロリータ道, Massugu Rorīta-dō) Tokyo: Kobunsha. ISBN 978-4334953805 (in Japanese)
