= Hadano Castle =

Ruinous remains of a castle structure in Hadano City, Japan

Coordinates: 35.396729°N 139.232815°E

Hadano Castle (波多野城) is the name for the remains of a castle structure in Hadano City, Kanagawa Prefecture, Japan. The only features visible are the main mound, scattered bricks and moats.
