= Sakuradote Kofun =

Group of burial mounds in Hadano, Japan

Coordinates: 35°23′10.83″N 139°11′18.86″E

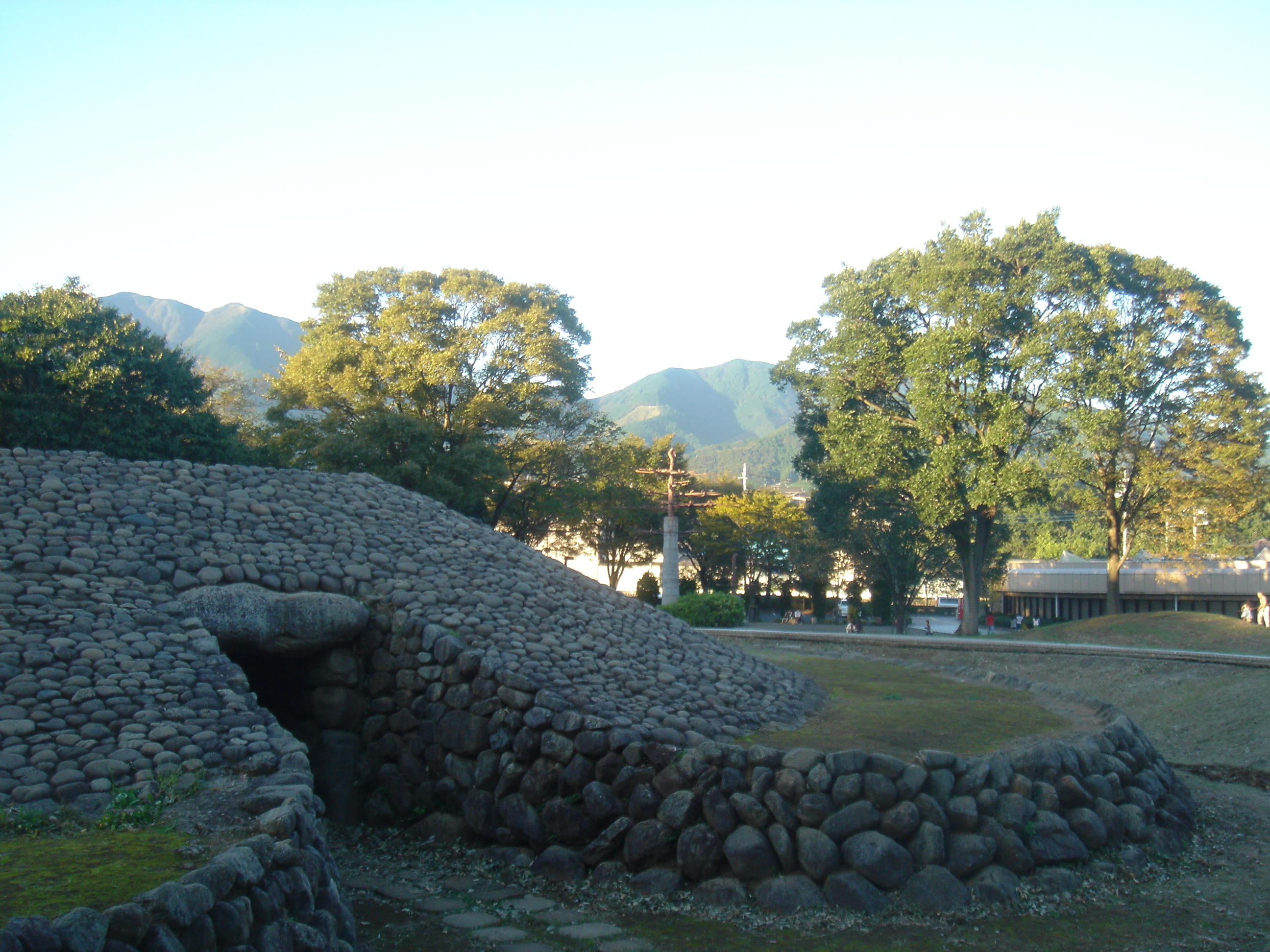
Sakuradote kofun

Sakuradote Kofun (桜土手古墳) is a group of kofun burial mounds located in Hadano, Kanagawa Prefecture, Japan. It is protected by the prefectural government as a national historic site.

Located on the right bank of the Mizunashi River, the Sakuradote Kofun complex consists of 35 tumuli in a small area measuring approximately 500 meters east-west by 300 meters north-south. From the style of construction and the artifacts recovered during archaeological excavation, these kofun are thought to date from the final period of kofun construction in the late 7th century AD.

The largest kofun has a diameter of 28 meters and a height of 5.6 meters.

Artifacts recovered included numerous shards of Sue ware and Haji ware, along with magatama and other jewelry, and remnants of weapons and armor, along with horse fittings. Only 12 of the original 35 kofun have been preserved. Five are located on the grounds of a nearby Nissan factory, and one on the grounds of a Shimadzu Corp. factory, and are thus not accessible to the public. Six have been preserved as the Sakuradote Kofun Park, and a small museum on site displays some of the finds.
