= Hiratsuka =

Hiratsuka 平塚市
- Special city
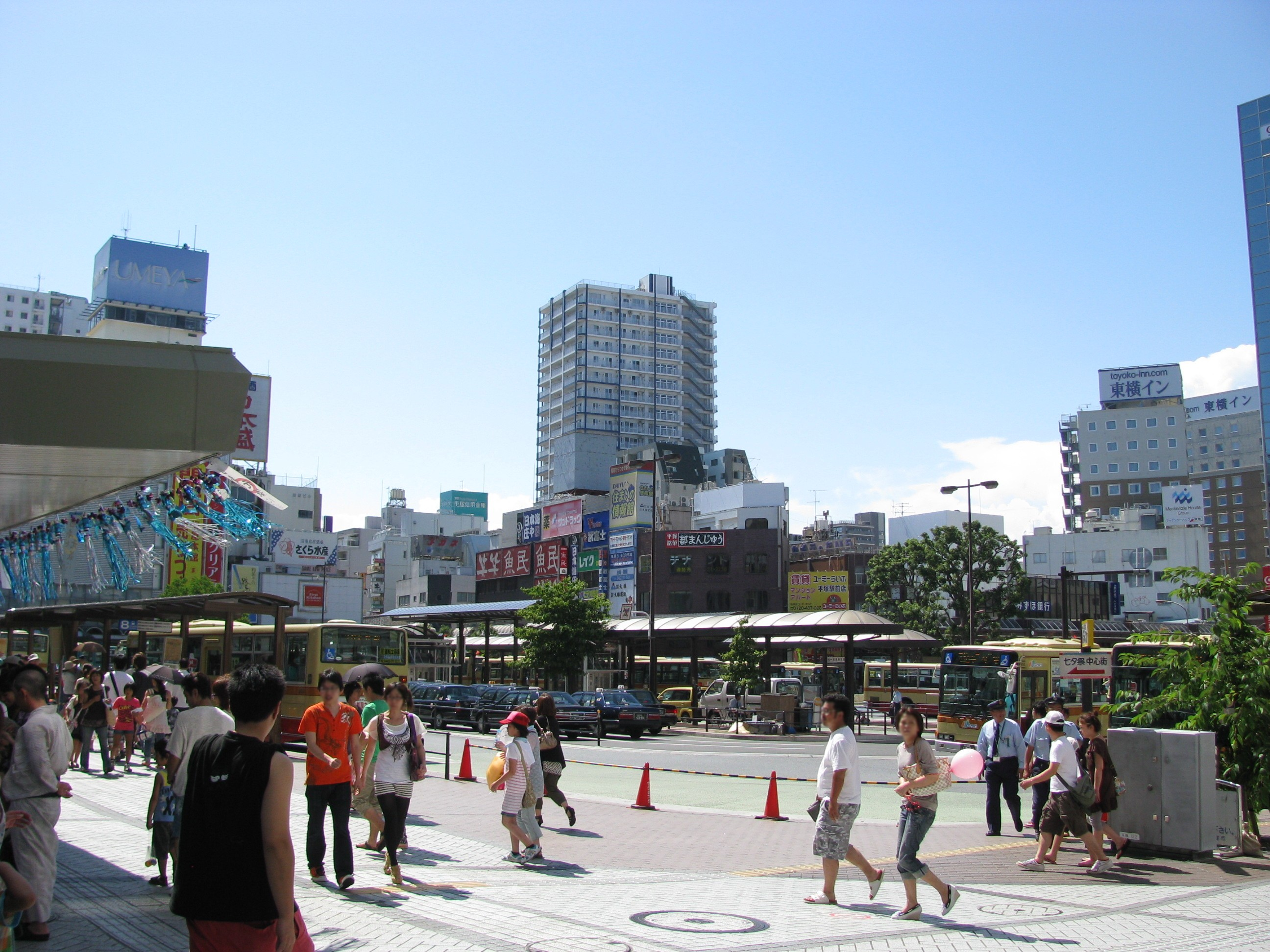
- Hiratsuka

- Flag Seal

- Location of Hiratsuka in Kanagawa Prefecture

- Coordinates: 35°19′N 139°21′E
- Country: Japan
- Region: Kantō
- Prefecture: Kanagawa
- First official recorded: late 3rd century (official)
- Town settled: April 1, 1889
- City settled: April 1, 1932

Government
  - Mayor: Katsuhiro Ochiai (since May 2011)

Area
  - Total: 67.88 km^{2} (26.21 sq mi)

Population (April 1, 2021)
  - Total: 257,316
  - Density: 3,791/km^{2} (9,818/sq mi)
- Time zone: UTC+9 (Japan Standard Time)
  - Tree: Camphor laurel
  - Flower: Dianthus
  - Bird: Egret
- Phone number: 0463-23-1111
- Address: 9-1 Sengenchō, Hiratsuka-shi, Kanagawa-ken 254-8686
- Website: Official website

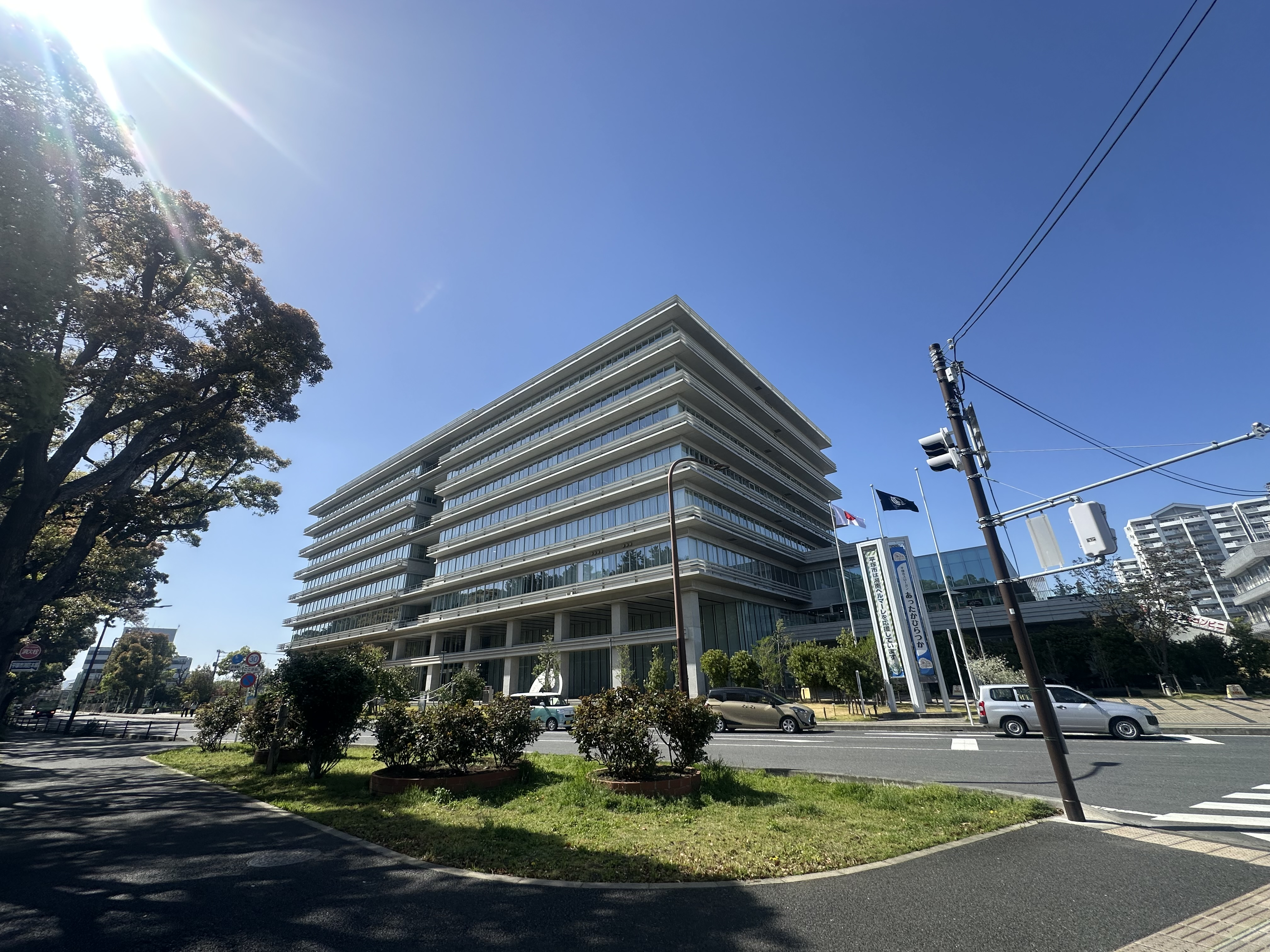
Hiratsuka City Hall

Hiratsuka (平塚市, Hiratsuka-shi) is a city in Kanagawa Prefecture, Japan. As of 1 April 2021, the city had an estimated population of 257,316 and a population density of 3800 persons per km². The total area of the city is 67.88 square kilometres (26.21 sq mi).

== Geography ==
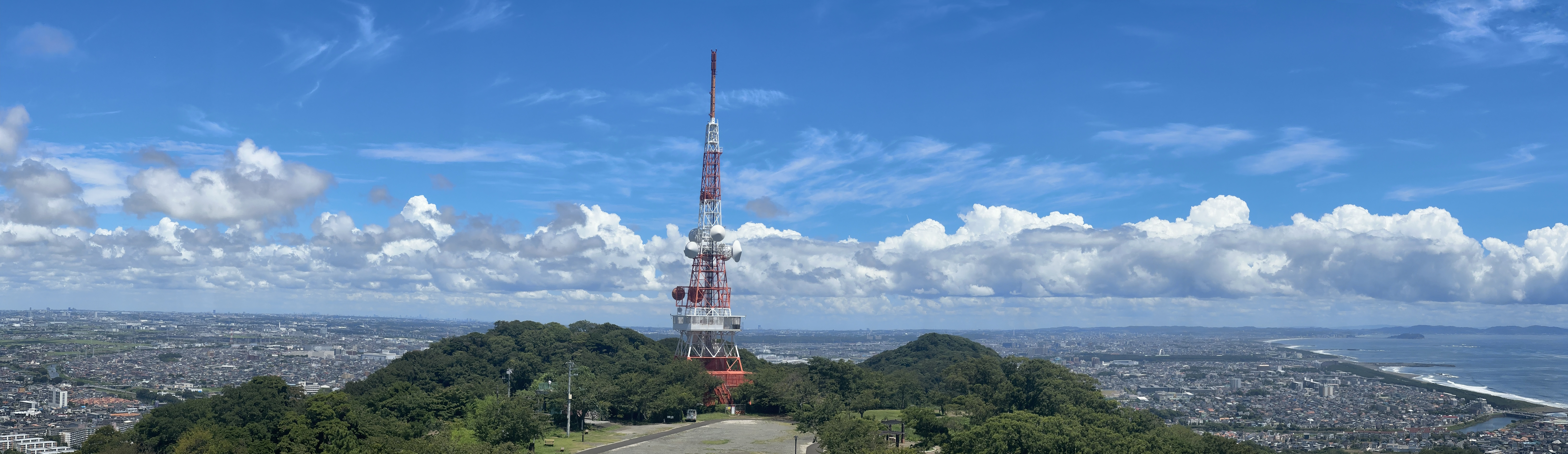
Hiratsuka from Shonandaira (The left side is the north, the center is Hiratsuka TV Tower, and on the right in the rear is Sagami Bay and the mouth of the Sagami River.)

Hiratsuka is located in the Shōnan area on the right bank (west side) of the Sagami River, almost in the center of Kanagawa Prefecture, and faces Sagami Bay to the south. The area from the Sagami River to the Kaname River is a plain to the northern end of the city area, and the urban area extends to the south. The west side of the Kaname River is a hilly area that is part of the Oiso Hills, and there is a lot of greenery. It is approximately midway between Tokyo and Mount Fuji.

=== Surrounding municipalities ===
Kanagawa Prefecture

- Atsugi
- Chigasaki
- Hadano
- Isehara
- Nakai
- Ninomiya
- Oiso
- Samukawa

=== Climate ===
Hiratsuka has a humid subtropical climate (Köppen Cfa) characterized by warm summers and cool winters with light to no snowfall. The average annual temperature in Hiratsuka is 14.6 °C. The average annual rainfall is 2144 mm with September as the wettest month. The temperatures are highest on average in August, at around 25.2 °C, and lowest in January, at around 4.4 °C.

== Demographics ==
Per Japanese census data, the population of Hiratsuka grew rapidly during the late 20th century but has plateaued in the 21st.

Historical population
Year	Pop.	±%
1950	49,638	—
1960	108,279	+118.1%
1970	163,671	+51.2%
1980	214,293	+30.9%
1990	245,950	+14.8%
2000	254,633	+3.5%
2010	260,780	+2.4%
2020	258,422	−0.9%

== History ==
The area around Hiratsuka has been settled since prehistoric times, and mention of the area as part of ancient Ōsumi District, Sagami Province is found in Nara period records. From the Heian period through Kamakura period, the area was divided into shōen controlled by various samurai clans and in the Sengoku period was the site of several battles between the later Hōjō clan of Odawara and the Miura clan. After the defeat of the Odawara at the Battle of Odawara by Hideyoshi Toyotomi, the area came under the control of Ieyasu Tokugawa, who built a summer palace (the Nakahara Goten) in 1596 at the site now occupied by the Hiratsuka City Nakahara Elementary/Primary School. Hiratsuka was retained as tenryō territory after the establishment of the Tokugawa shogunate, and flourished as Hiratsuka-juku, a post town on the Tōkaidō connecting Edo with Kyoto. As the 7th station, it is often depicted in the series of ukiyo-e about the 53 Stations of the Tōkaidō made among others by artists such Hokusai and Hiroshige.

After the Meiji Restoration, Hiratsuka town was founded on April 1, 1889 with the creation of the municipalities system, as part of the new Naka District within Kanagawa Prefecture. It merged with neighboring Suma Town on April 1, 1929, and was proclaimed Hiratsuka City on April 1, 1932.

Prior to World War II, Hiratsuka was the location of the Hiratsuka Navy Ammunitions Arsenal (平塚海軍火薬廠) of the Imperial Japanese Navy and Japan International Aircraft Industries (日本国際航空工業), a Nissan group military aircraft factory. Hiratsuka was largely destroyed on July 16, 1945, during the Bombing of Hiratsuka in World War II. Due to its strategic location and wide beaches, it was also one of the targets for the planned invasion of Japan during the final stages of World War II.

The city quickly rebuilt after the war, annexing several neighboring villages in the mid-1950s to attain its current area. The population exceeded 200,000 by 2001 and Hiratsuka became a special city with increased autonomy from the central government.

== Government ==
Hiratsuka has a mayor-council form of government with a directly elected mayor and a unicameral city council of 26 members. Hiratsuka contributes three members to the Kanagawa Prefectural Assembly. In terms of national politics, the city is part of Kanagawa 15th district of the lower house of the Diet of Japan.

== Economy ==
Hiratsuka has a mixed economy, with tax revenue coming from bets made at the Shonan Bank Cycling Velodrome and, several industries located in industrial parks in the outskirts of town. Major plants are operated by Nissan Shatai, Yokohama Rubber Company, Canon, Furukawa Electric, Pilot – the famous Namiki pens are produced at Hiratsuka, Kansai Paint, and Mitsubishi Plastics. Nissan Shatai is the largest employer in the city, but announced plans to move a factory to Kanda. Western firms such as Moog and MacDermid Performance Solutions also have a strong presence in this city. Hiratsuka is also a bedroom community for Yokohama and Tokyo, with residents attracted by the "Shōnan lifestyle".

== Education ==
Hiratsuka has 28 public elementary schools and 15 public middle schools operated by the city government. The city has five public high schools operated by the Kanagawa Prefectural Board of Education and one private high school. The prefecture also operates four special education schools for the handicapped. A private junior college, the Tokai University Junior College of Nursing and Technology is located within Hiratsuka, which also has branch campuses of Kanagawa University, Shoin University and Tokai University.

== Transportation ==
=== Railway ===
JR East – Tōkaidō Main Line, Shōnan Shinjuku Line

- Hiratsuka

=== Highway ===
- Odawara-Atsugi Road
- National Route 1, to Tokyo or Kyoto
- National Route 129, to Sagamihara
- National Route 134, to Yokosuka via Kamakura
- National Route 271, to Atsugi or Odawara (toll)
- Shinshōnan Bypass

== Tourist attractions ==
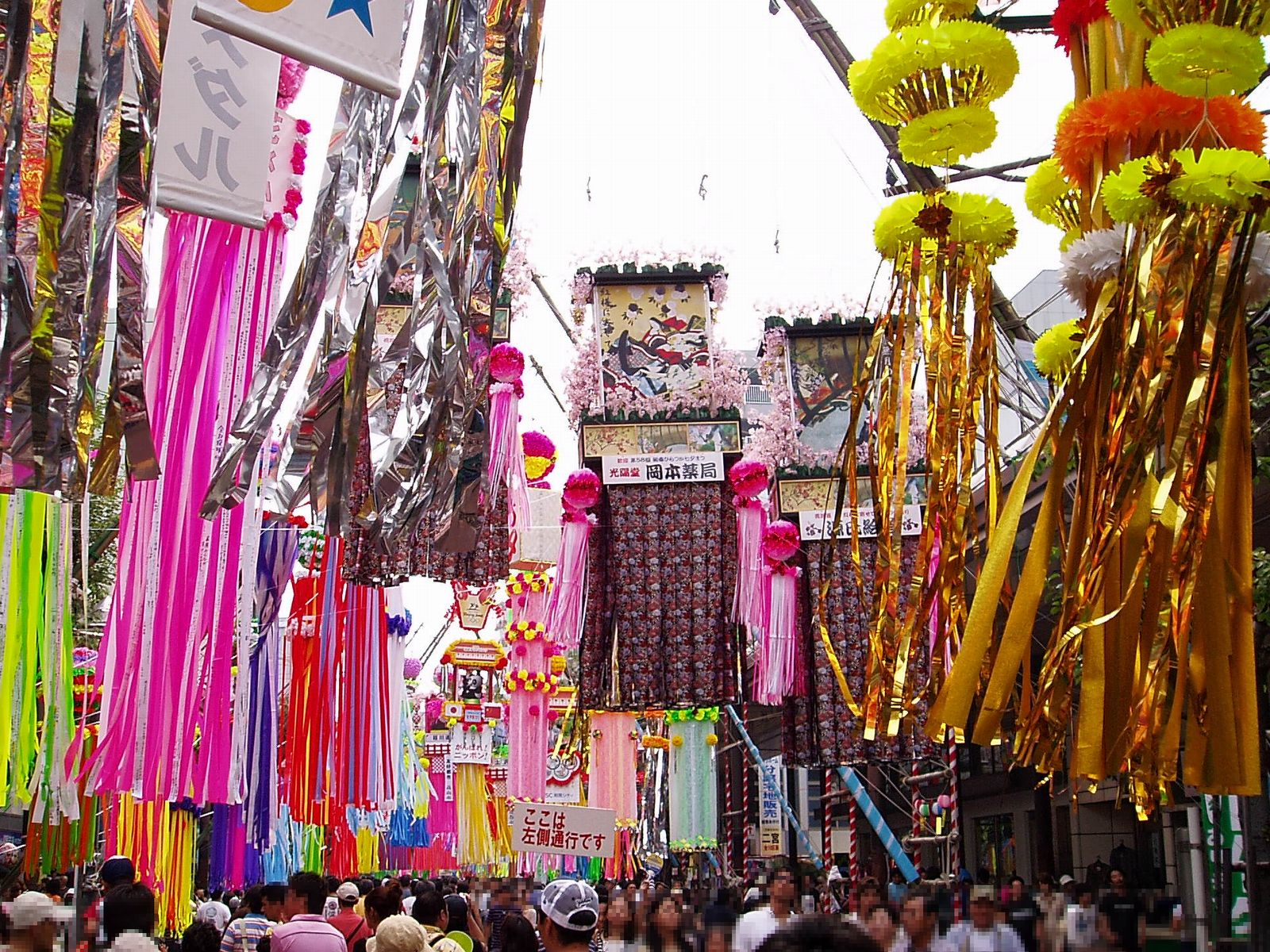
Hiratsuka Tanabata festival

- Tanabata festival
- Shonan Bellmare football club, three-time Japanese champions based at Hiratsuka Athletics Stadium
- Kana Garden
- Hiratsuka Hachiman-gu, Shinto shrine
- Hiratsuka Museum of Art
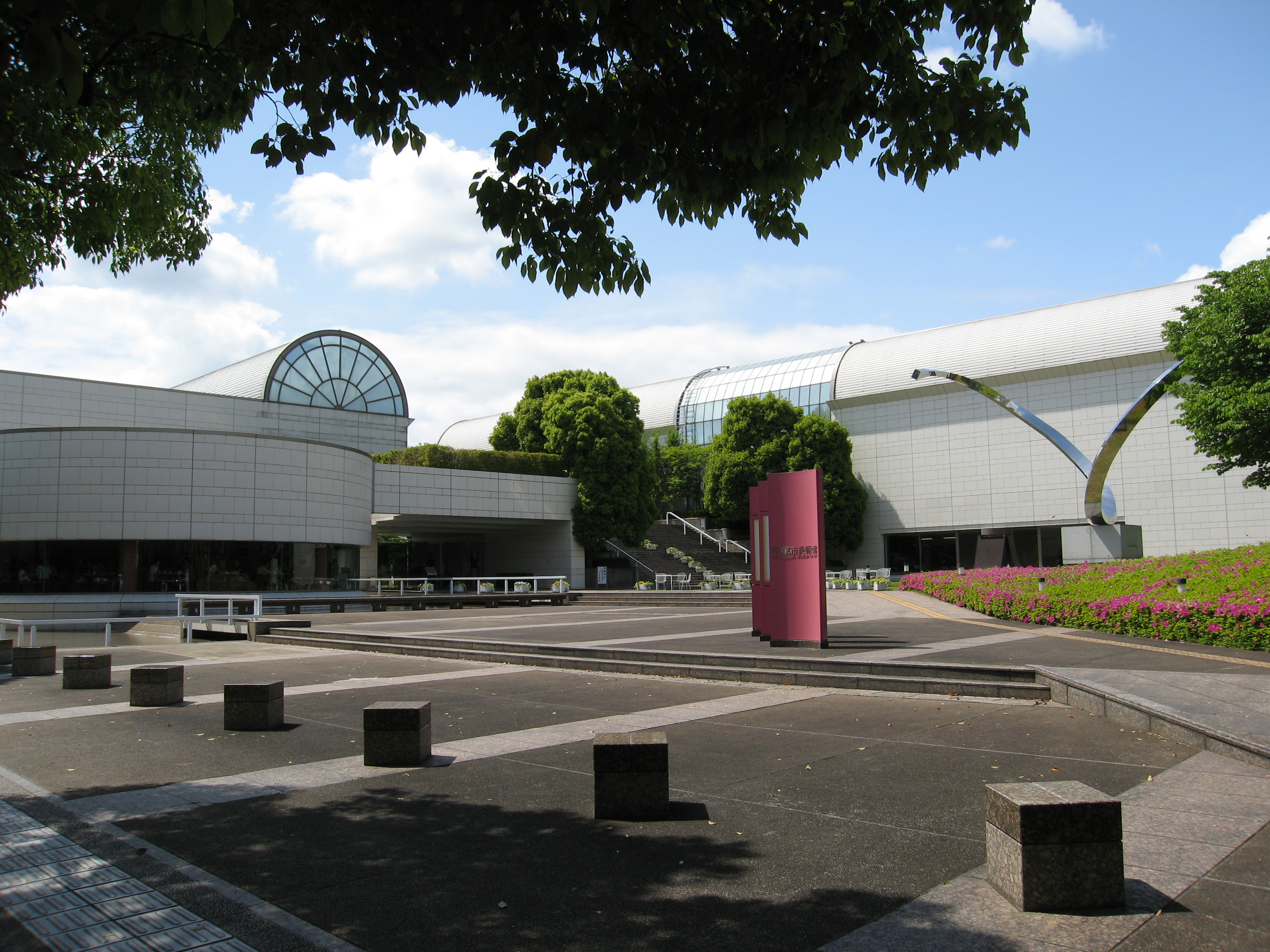
Hiratsuka Museum of Art

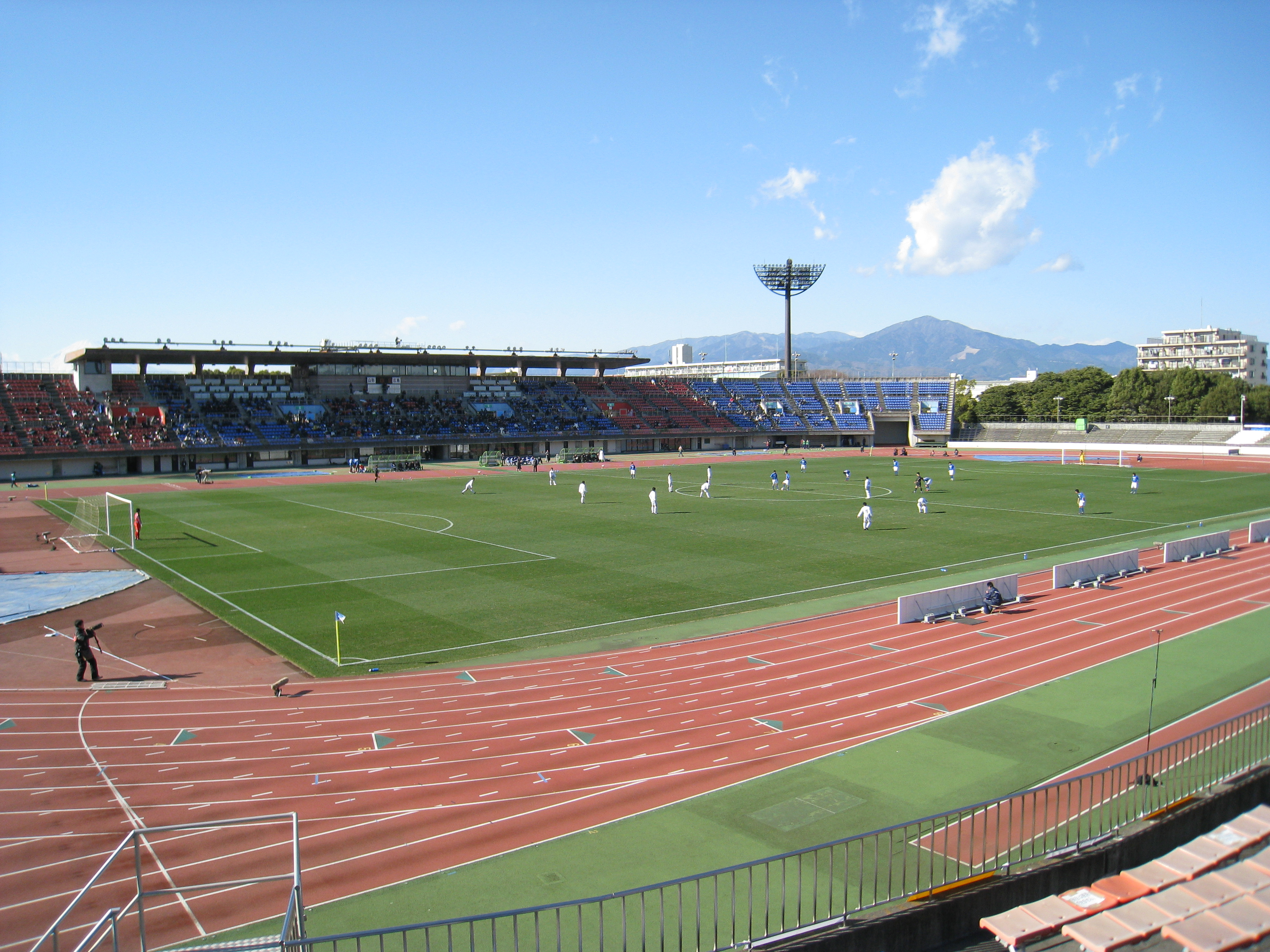
Hiratsuka Athletics Stadium

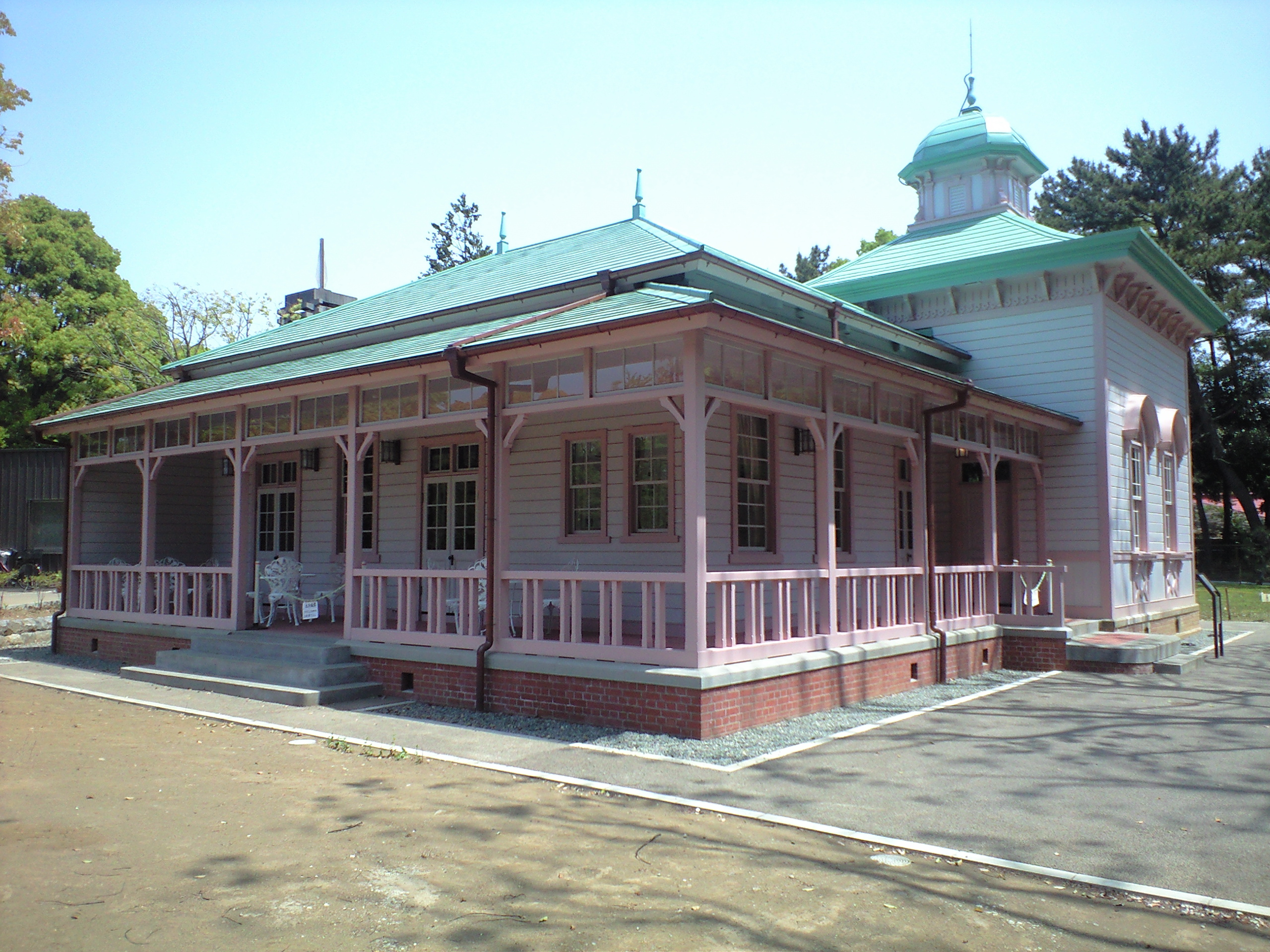
Building of former Hiratsuka Navy Ammunitions Arsenal

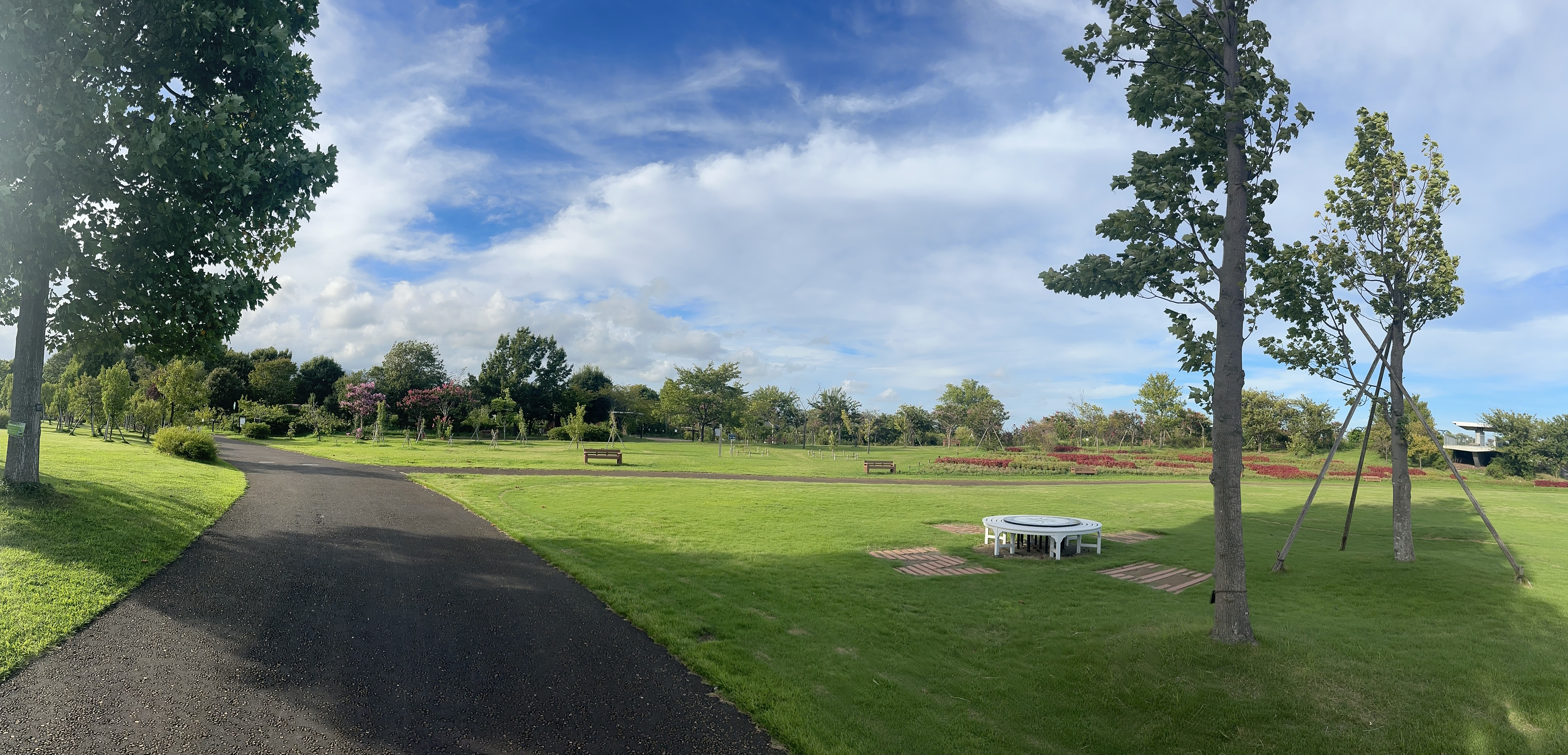
Kana Garden

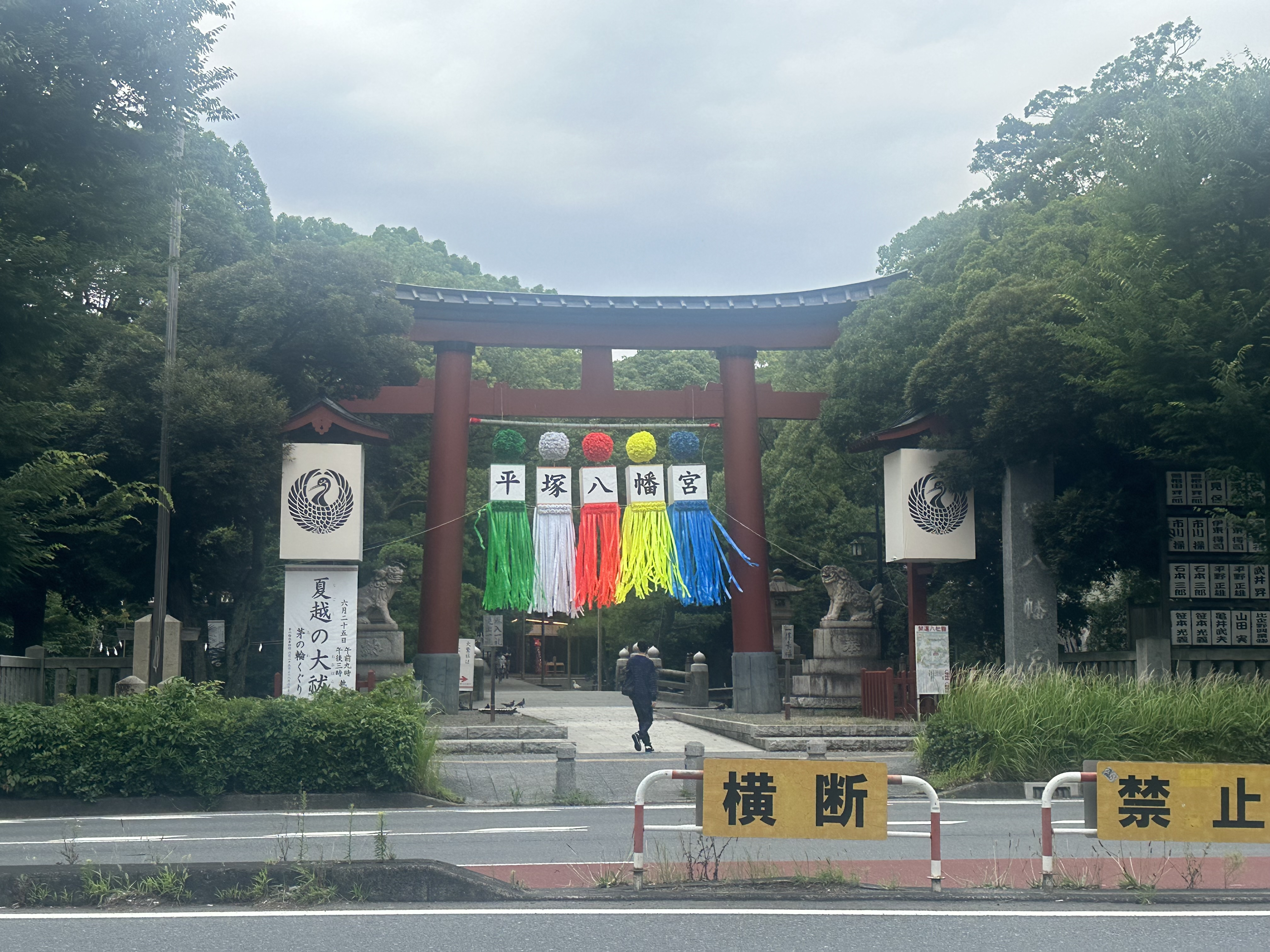
Hiratsuka Hachiman-gu

== Sister cities ==
- Alytus, Lithuania, since 2017
- Hanamaki, Iwate, Japan, since April 27, 1984
- Izu, Shizuoka, Japan, since February 6, 2013
- Kaunas, Lithuania, since November 25, 2023
- Lawrence, Kansas, United States, since September 21, 1990
- Takayama, Gifu, Japan, since October 22, 1982

== Notable people from Hiratsuka ==
- Hokuto Shimoda, professional football player
- Izumi Sakai, singer, songwriter, vocal of Zard
- Kansuke Naka, novelist, essayist
- Kamijo, singer
- Lalla Hirayama, Japanese-born South African television host, actress, dancer and model
- Michael Hora, former child actor
- Michiko Kawai, actress
- Mitsunori Takaboshi, racing driver
- Minami Umezawa, singer, actress, and model
- Nagi Inoue, singer, actress, and model
- Phongchi, Japanese idol of Vietnamese descent
- Yukari Fukui, voice actress
- Yamanashi Hanzō, general, politician
- Yuki Kubota, actor, model
