= Tsurumaki-Onsen Station =

Railway station in Hadano, Kanagawa Prefecture, Japan

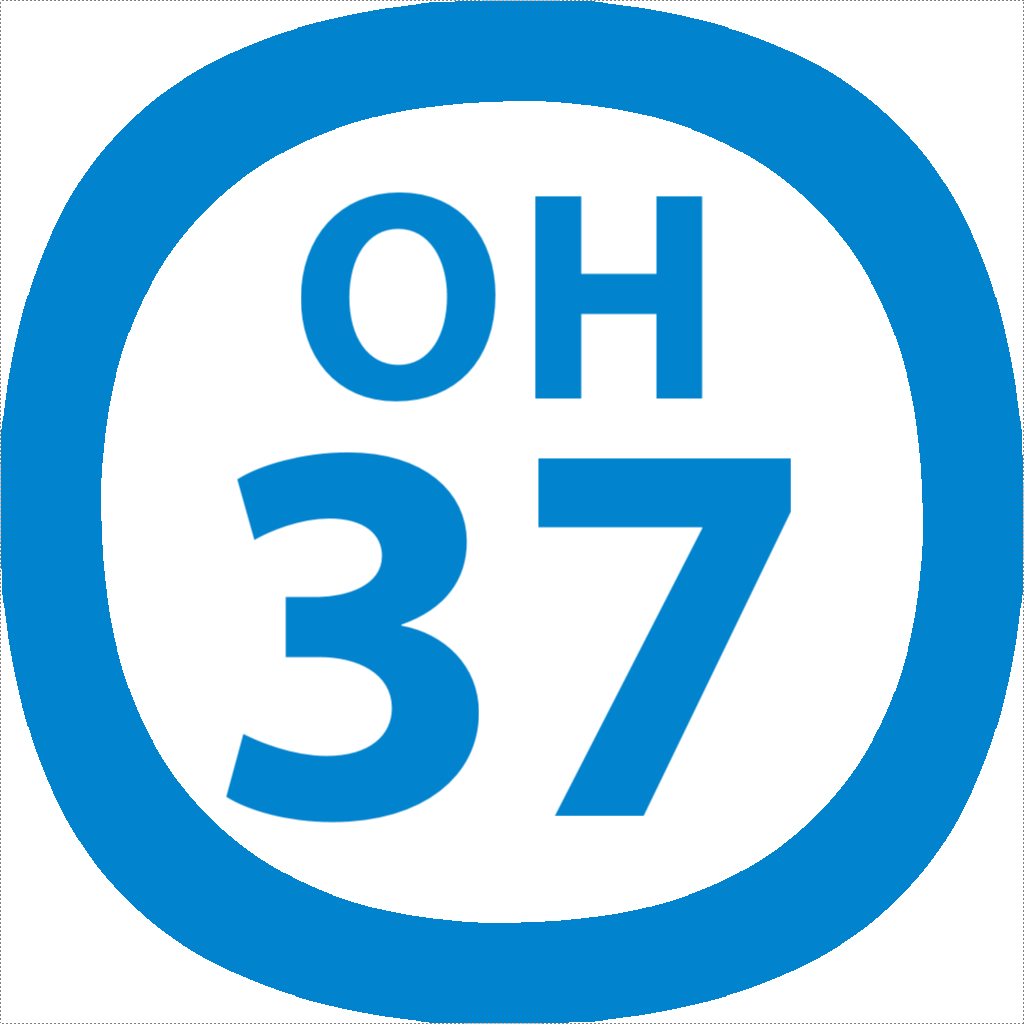
Tsurumaki-Onsen Station 鶴巻温泉駅

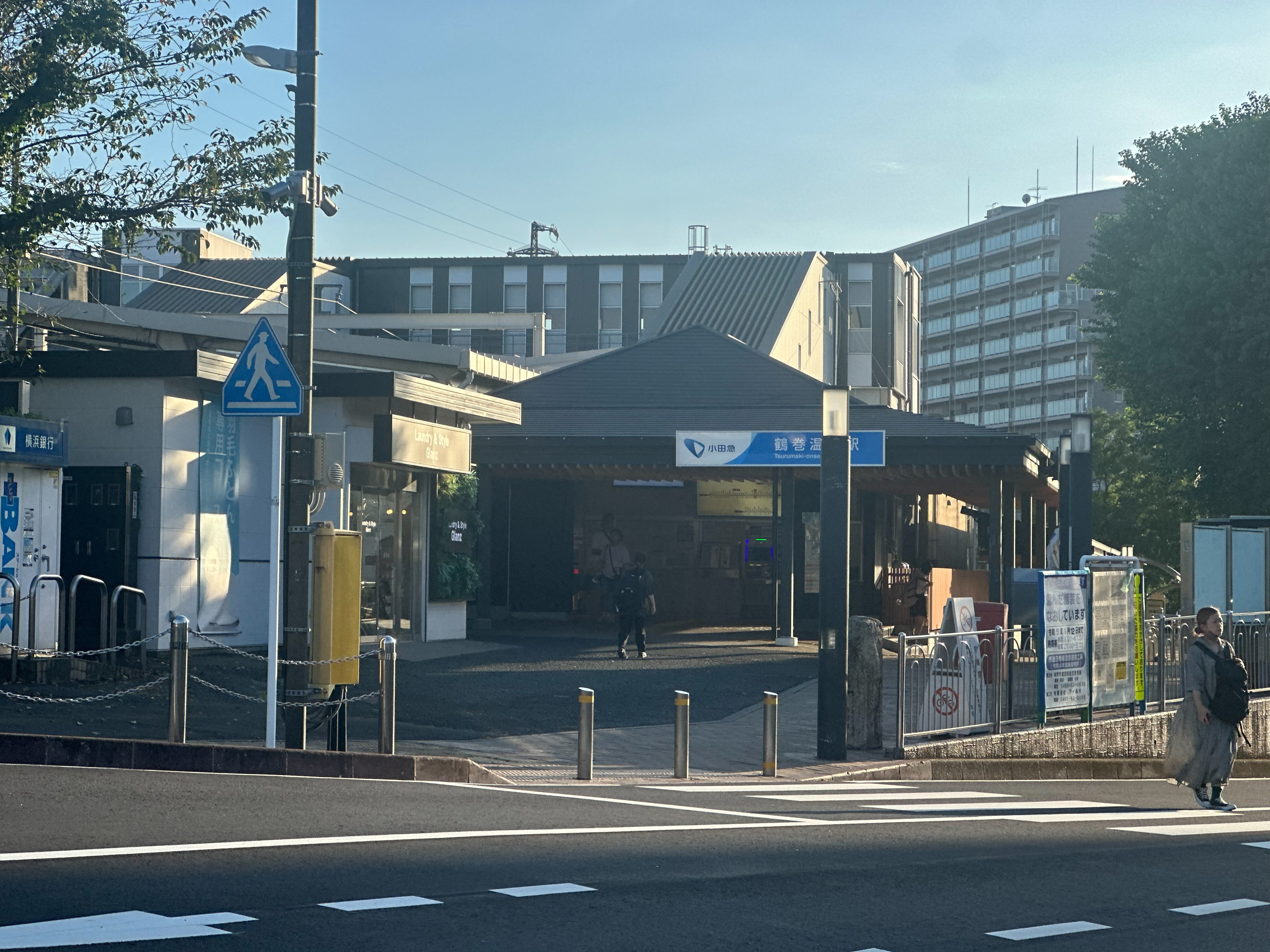
- Tsurumaki-Onsen Station north exit, September 2023

General information
- Location: 2-1-1 Tsurumakikita, Hadano-shi, Kanagawa-ken 257-0001; Japan
- Coordinates: 35.381125°N 139.277866°E
- Operator: Odakyu Electric Railway
- Line: ■ Odakyu Odawara Line
- Distance: 55.9 km from Shinjuku
- Platforms: 2 side platforms
- Connections: Bus terminal

Other information
- Status: Staffed
- Station code: OH-37
- Website: Official website

History
- Opened: 1 April 1927; 99 years ago
- Former names: Tsurumaki (until 1987)

Passengers
- FY2019: 14,963 daily

Services
Preceding station	Odakyu	Following station
Tōkaidaigaku-mae towards Odawara	Odawara Line Rapid Express	Isehara towards Shinjuku
Tōkaidaigaku-mae towards Odawara	Odawara Line Express Local	Isehara towards Shinjuku or Yoyogi-Uehara
Location
- Location within Kanagawa Prefecture Location within Japan

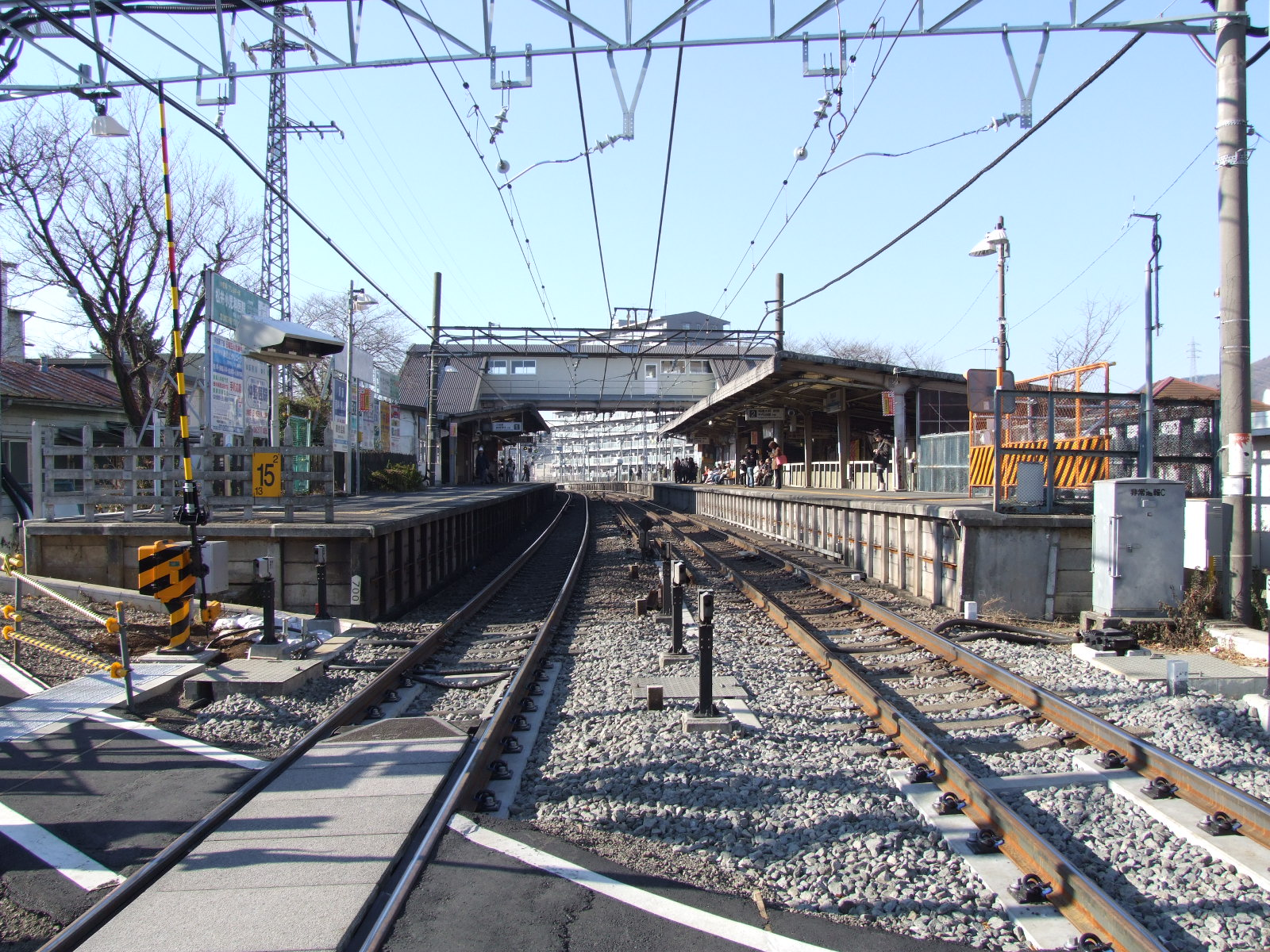
Approaching Tsurumaki-Onsen Station

Tsurumaki-Onsen Station (鶴巻温泉駅, Tsurumaki-Onsen-eki) is a passenger railway station located in the city of Hadano, Kanagawa Prefecture, Japan. The station operated by the private railway operator Odakyu Electric Railway.

== Lines ==
Tsurumaki-Onsen Station is served by the Odakyu Odawara Line, and lies 55.9 rail kilometers from the line's terminal at Shinjuku Station.

== Station layout ==
The station has two opposed side platforms with two tracks, connected to the station building by a footbridge. The station building is a one-story wooden structure. Outside the station is a stone monument commemorating the 40th anniversary of the completion of the Odakyu Odawara line.

=== Platforms ===
1	■ Odakyu Odawara Line	for Shin-Matsuda and Odawara
2	■ Odakyu Odawara Line	for Sagami-Ono, Shin-Yurigaoka, and Shinjuku

== History ==
Tsurumaki-Onsen Station was opened on 1 April 1927, on the Odakyu Odawara Line of the Odakyu Electric Railway with normal and 6-car limited express services as Tsurumaki Station (鶴巻駅, Tsurumaki-eki). It was given its present name on 15 March 1937, but reverted to its original name in 1944 as wartime authorities felt that the onsen in the name appeared frivolous in light of wartime austerities. The current name was restored only in 1987.

Station numbering was introduced in January 2014 with Tsurumaki-Onsen being assigned station number OH37.

== Passenger statistics ==
In fiscal 2019, the station was used by an average of 14,963 passengers daily.

The passenger figures for previous years are as shown below.

Fiscal year	daily average
2005	15,797
2010	15,266
2015	15,154

== Surrounding area ==
- Tsurumaki Hot Springs
- Tsurumaki Onsen Hospital

== See also ==
- List of railway stations in Japan
