= Hadano Station =

Railway station in Hadano, Kanagawa Prefecture, Japan

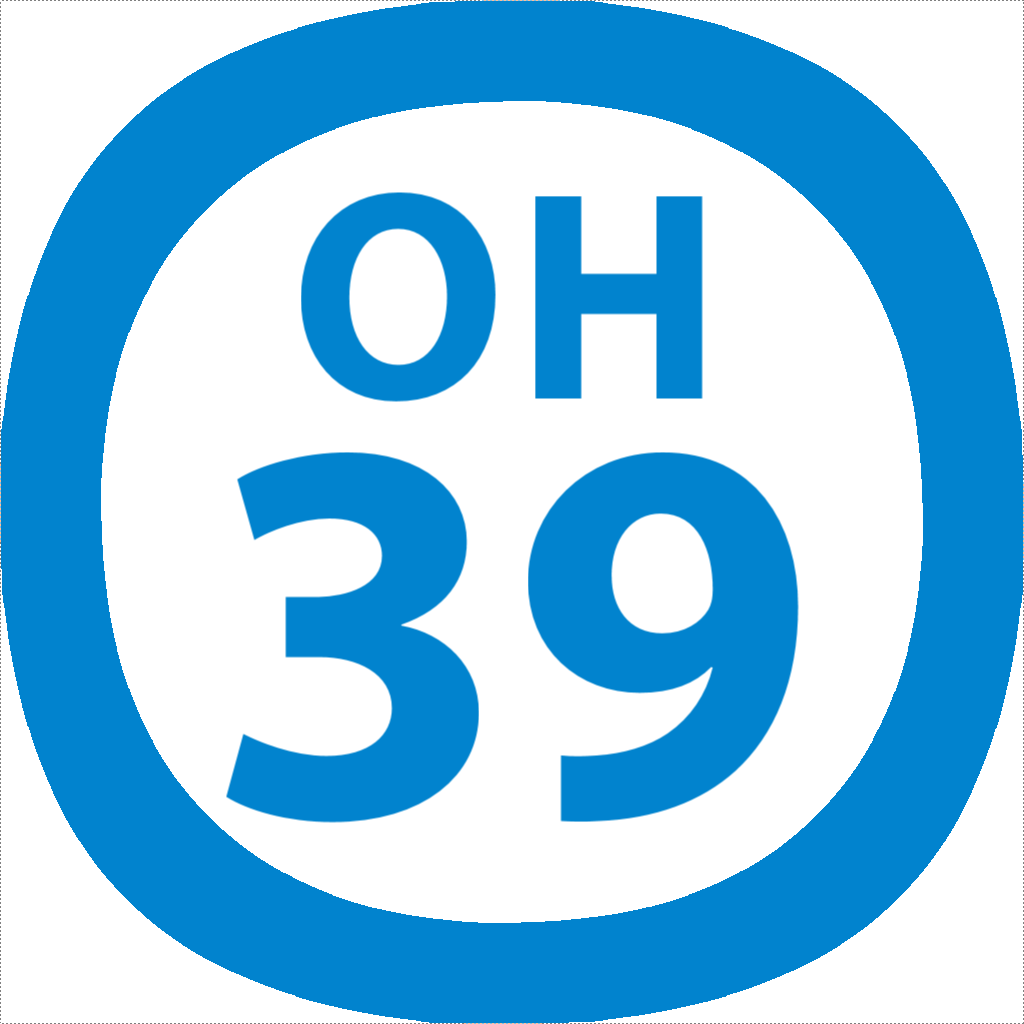
Hadano Station 秦野駅

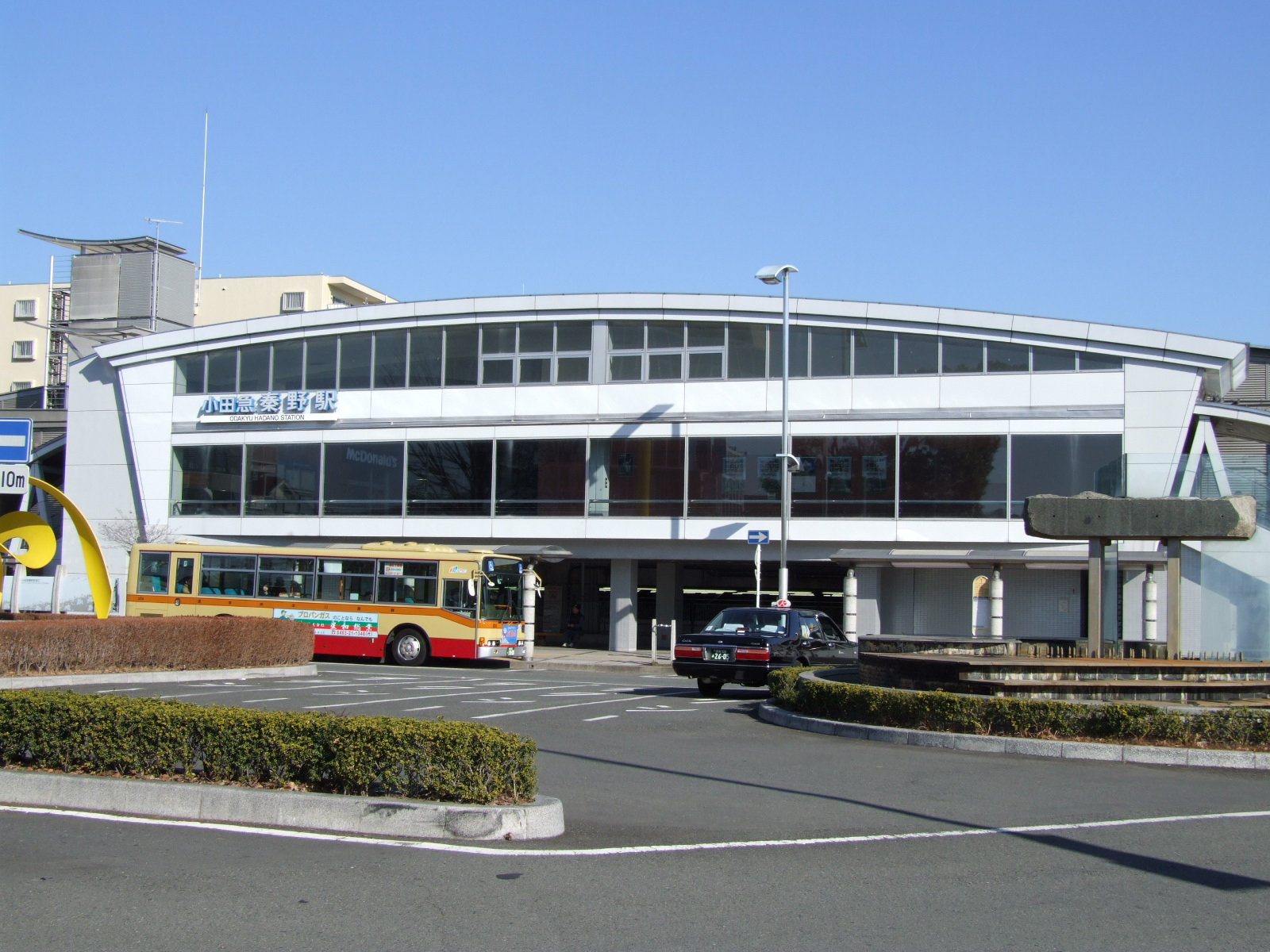
- South Exit of Hadano Station

General information
- Location: Ohatano 1-chome, Hadano-shi, Kanagawa-ken 257-0034; Japan
- Coordinates: 35°22′12.26″N 139°13′33.8″E
- Operator: Odakyu Electric Railway
- Line: ■ Odakyu Odawara Line
- Distance: 61.7 km from Shinjuku
- Platforms: 2 island platforms
- Connections: Bus terminal

Other information
- Status: Staffed
- Station code: OH-39
- Website: Official website

History
- Opened: 1 April 1927; 99 years ago
- Former names: Ohatano (until 1987)

Passengers
- FY2019: 42,011 daily

Services
Preceding station	Odakyu	Following station
Matsuda CB04 towards Gotemba	Romancecar	Isehara towards Shinjuku or Kita-Senju
Odawara towards Hakone-Yumoto	Romancecar	Isehara towards Shinjuku or Kita-Senju
Shibusawa towards Odawara	Odawara Line Rapid Express	Tōkaidaigaku-mae towards Shinjuku
Shibusawa towards Odawara	Odawara Line Express Local	Tōkaidaigaku-mae towards Shinjuku or Yoyogi-Uehara
Location
- Location within Kanagawa Prefecture Location within Japan

Hadano Station (Japanese: 秦野駅, Hepburn: Hadano-eki) is a passenger railway station located in the city of Hadano, Kanagawa Prefecture, Japan. The station operated by the private railway operator Odakyu Electric Railway.

== Lines ==
Hadano Station is served by the Odakyu Odawara Line, and lies 61.7 rail kilometers from the line's terminal at Shinjuku Station.

== Station layout ==
The station has two island platforms with four tracks, with the station building is constructed on a cantilever above the platforms and tracks.

=== Platforms ===
1	■ Odakyu Odawara Line	Westbound Shin-Matsuda and Odawara
2	■ Odakyu Odawara Line	Westbound (For Shin-Matsuda, and Odawara)
3	■ Odakyu Odawara Line	Eastbound (Sagami-Ono, Shin-Yurigaoka, Chiyoda line Ayase and Shinjuku)
4	■ Odakyu Odawara Line	Eastbound (For Sagami-Ono, Shin-Yurigaoka, Yoyogi-Uehara, Chiyoda line Ayase, and Shinjuku)

== History ==
Hadano Station was opened on 1 April 1927 on the Odakyu Odawara Line of the Odakyu Electric Railway with normal and 6-car limited express services as Ohatano Station (大秦野駅, Ōhatano-eki). It was given its present name on 9 March 1987. The current station building was completed in 1996 and associated department store in 1997. A number of Romancecar express services commenced in 1998.

Station numbering was introduced in January 2014 with Hadano being assigned station number OH39.

To commemorate the 70th anniversary of Hadano City, the station began using songs by the rock band Luna Sea as train melodies in November 2025; "Rosier" as the inbound melody and "I for You" as the outbound. Four of the band's members are from Hadano and a black granite monument featuring the handprints and signatures of all five members was unveiled on Mahoroba Bridge, near the north exit of Hadano Station, in May 2026. Additionally, two plaques commemorating the use of their songs as train melodies were installed at the north and south exits of the station.

== Passenger statistics ==
In fiscal 2019, the station was used by an average of 42,011 passengers daily.

The passenger figures for previous years are as shown below.

Fiscal year	daily average
2005	41,102
2010	41,918
2015	43,055

== Surrounding area ==
- Hadano City Hall
- Hadano Red Cross Hospital
- Sophia Junior College

== See also ==
- List of railway stations in Japan
