= Hiratsuka Navy Ammunitions Arsenal =

Gunpowder manufacturer in Ōno, Japan

Coordinates: 35°20′10″N 139°21′12″E

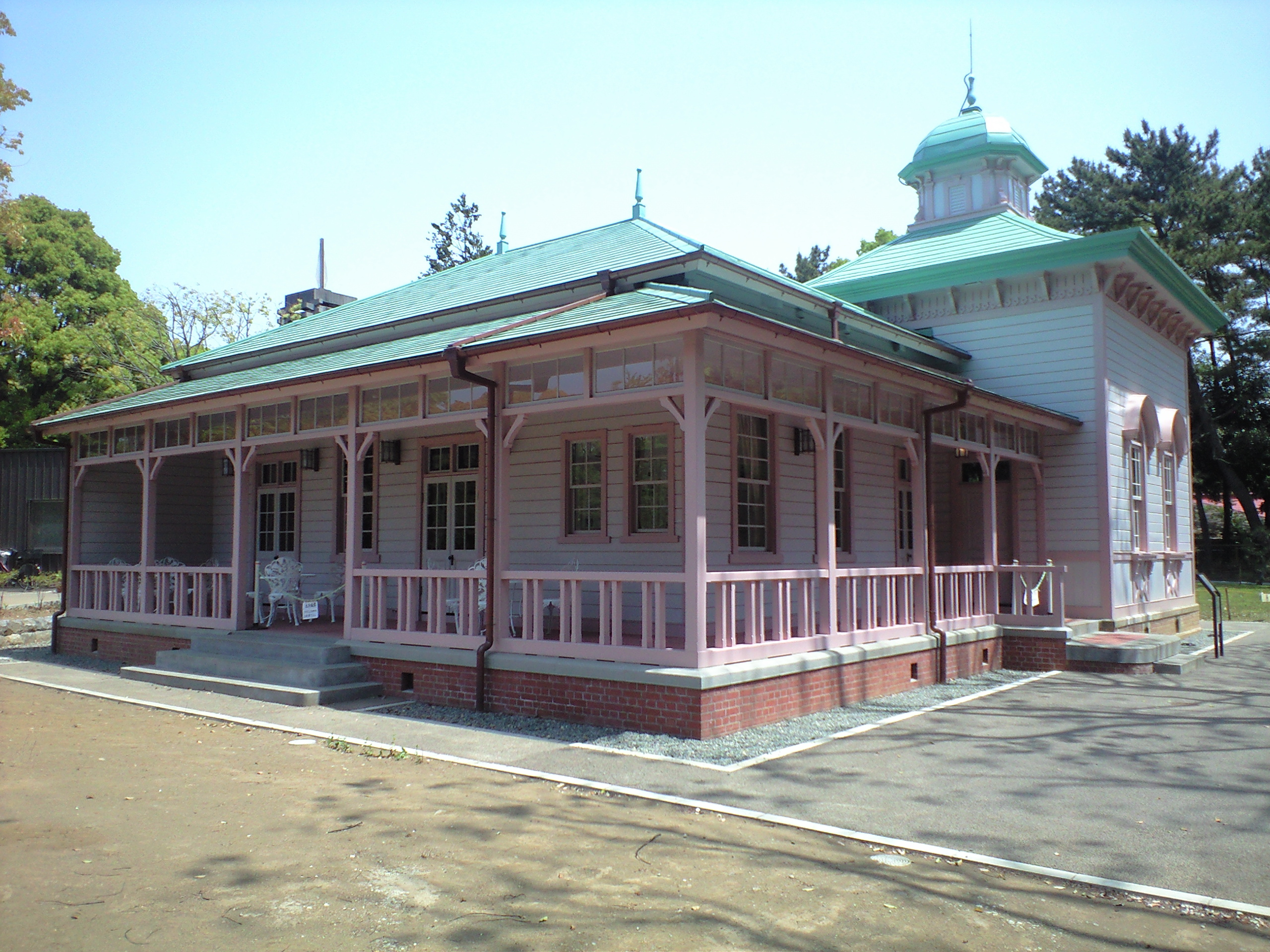
Surviving building of the Naval Ammunitions Arsenal from 1912

The Hiratsuka Naval Ammunitions Arsenal (平塚海軍火薬廠, Hiratsuka Kaigun Kayaku Shō) was the principal manufacturer of gunpowder, explosives, ammunition and artillery shells for the Imperial Japanese Navy. It was located in the town of Ōno (now part of the city of Hiratsuka), Kanagawa Prefecture, Japan.

== History ==
The Hiratsuka Naval Ammunitions Arsenal was initially established as a private joint venture enterprise by the foreign firms of Armstrong Whitworth, Nobel, and Vickers in September 1905. All three companies were very active in the supply of weaponry for warships to the early Imperial Japanese Navy. The plant was purchased by the Navy in April 1919 and came under the operational control of the Imperial Japanese Navy Technical Department. Its facilities were greatly expanded from 1939–1941 due to the military buildup before the start of the Pacific War.

The facilities consisted of seven plants:

- Smokeless powder for rockets and artillery
- Nitrocellulose and mixed acids production
- Various acids and hydrogen production
- Design and engineering, prototype development
- Machine gun ammunition production, solvent recovery
- Naval artillery shells
- Nitroglycerin production

On the night of July 16, 1945, the facilities were attacked by 138 B-29 Superfortress bombers of the USAAF 20th Air Force, 314th Bombardment Wing which dropped a total of 1163 tons of incendiary bombs on the city, destroying most of the city center. Only 5% of the capacity of the Imperial Japanese Navy Ammunition Arsenal was affected, as the bombing was concentrated on Hiratsuka's civilian population center, rather than the military industries located on the outskirts of town. However, production was almost non-existent by July 1945 due to a lack of raw materials. The plant ceased operation with the surrender of Japan in August 1945 and was officially closed on November 30, 1945. The facilities were occupied by American troops until the end of 1950.

At present, on the site of the former Hiratsuka Naval Ammunitions Arsenal is a large factory operated by Yokohama Rubber Company. The company has preserved a western-style building dating from 1912 as the "Yokohama Rubber Memorial Hall of Hiratsuka" (旧横浜ゴム平塚製造所記念館). This structure was a residence of one of the expatriate British engineers of the original joint venture company and is one of the few structures from the Meiji period remaining in Hiratsuka. The building is available for rental for parties and social functions. It is listed as tangible cultural property.
