= Juria Nakagawa =

Japanese model (born 1995)

Nakagawa Juria
- Born: Tokyo
- Occupation: Model

Nakagawa Juria is a Japanese fashion model. She was born in Tokyo, Japan. She has been featured in Japanese fashion magazines.
