= Fruits (magazine) =

Japanese fashion magazine

- Cover of issue 95
- Editor: Shoichi Aoki
- Categories: Street fashion
- Frequency: Monthly
- Publisher: Shoichi Aoki
- First issue: June 1997
- Final issue: February 2017
- Country: Japan
- Based in: Tokyo
- Language: Japanese
- Website: Official site

Fruits (stylized as FRUiTS) was a Japanese monthly street fashion magazine founded in 1997 by photographer Shoichi Aoki. Though Fruits covered styles found throughout Tokyo, it is associated most closely with the fashion subcultures found in Tokyo's Harajuku district. The magazine primarily focused on individual styles found outside the fashion-industry mainstream, as well as subcultures specific to Japan, such as lolita and ganguro, and local interpretations of larger subcultures like punk and goth.

== Content ==
Fruits featured a simple layout, with the bulk of the magazine made up of single full-page photographs accompanied by a brief profile of the photographed person, which included their age, occupation, and a description of what brands they were wearing (if applicable), as well as their self-described "point of fashion" (style inspiration). Most issues included only a couple of advertisements, and typically only for local businesses. Occasional special-edition issues of Fruits also included more extensive profiles of frequently photographed people, or reader-created artwork.

== Reception ==
Fruits helped lead Western interest in Japanese fashion as some of its photographs became first popular in the fashion community, then synonymous with Japanese fashion in the West.

A selection of photographs from its earlier issues were showcased in the books Fruits (2001) and Fresh Fruits (2005), both published by Phaidon Press. An exhibition of Aoki's photographs for the magazine, developed by the Powerhouse Museum, has toured museums in Australia and New Zealand.

== Closure ==
After nearly 20 years and 233 issues, Aoki announced in February 2017 that Fruits magazine would cease publication effective immediately because "there are no more cool kids to photograph".

== Revival ==
As of May 2023, the first volume of Fruits has been brought back as an ePublication with an English-language version. Aoki has stated that he hopes to bring back the whole catalogue into circulation in English.

From April 27–May 12, 2024, Fruits held an exhibition in Laforet department building in Harajuku. Unlike a regular exhibition, which would center the content in one area, the photographs and features from previous Fruits publications were scattered throughout the walls of each floor of Laforet.

== See also ==
- Japanese street fashion
- Street fashion
- Street photography
