= Tegan Cunningham =

Australian rules football player

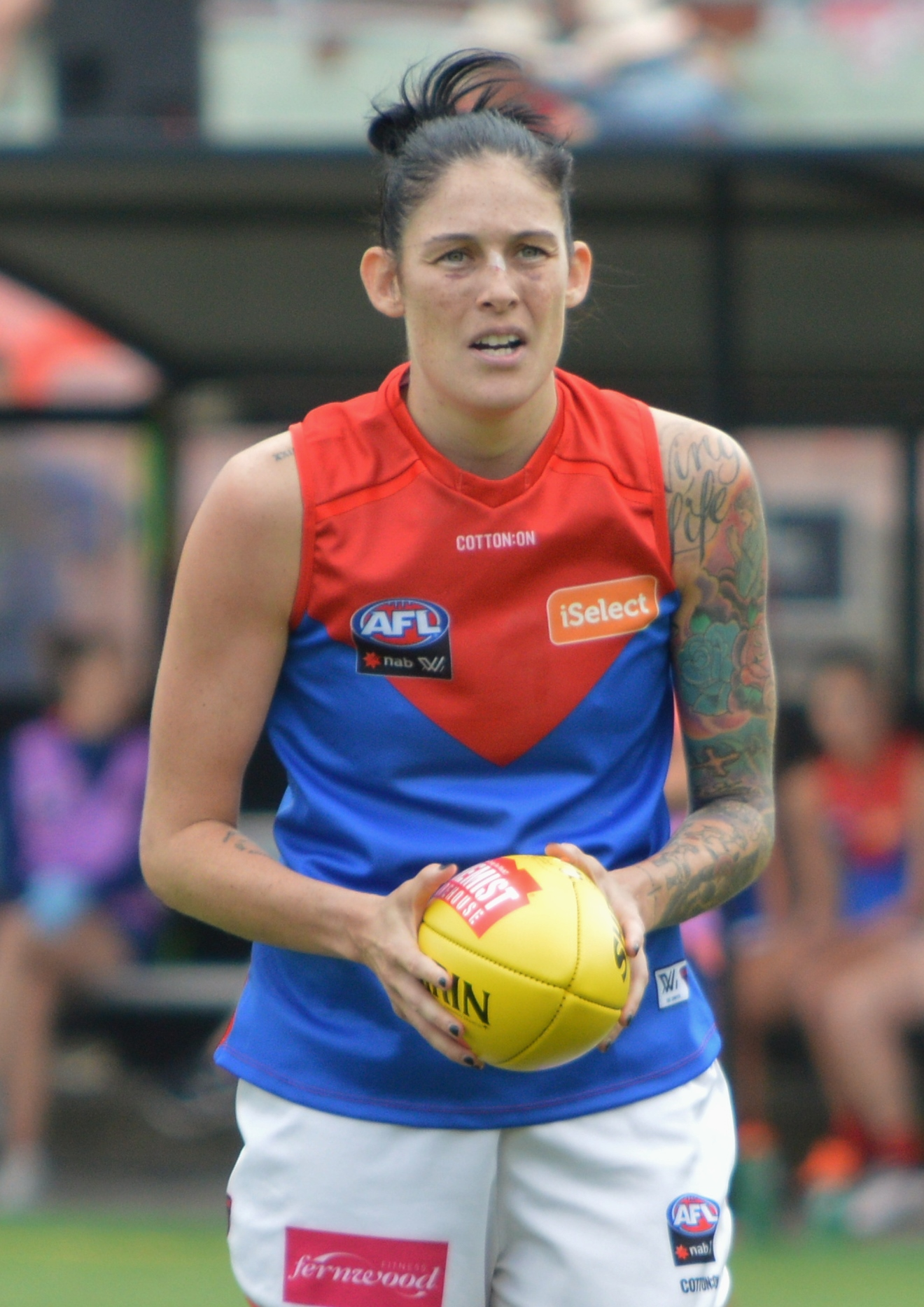
- Cunningham playing Australian rules football with Melbourne in March 2018
- Born: 23 January 1988 (age 38); Melbourne, Victoria
- Height: 183 cm (6 ft 0 in)
Australian rules football career
Personal information
- Draft: No. 22, 2017 AFL Women's draft
- Debut: Round 1, 2018, Melbourne vs. Greater Western Sydney, at Casey Fields
- Position: Forward
Playing career^{1}
Years	Club	Games (Goals)
2018–2021	Melbourne	32 (25)
2022 (S7)–2023	Hawthorn	8 (0)
Total		40 (25)
- ^{1} Playing statistics correct to the end of 2023.
Career highlights
- 2× Melbourne leading goalkicker: 2018, 2019
Basketball career

No. 1 – Melbourne Boomers
- Position: Guard / Forward
- League: WNBL

Career information
- College: Seward County Lady Saints (2006–2008) Oklahoma State (2008–2010)

Career history
- 2010–2011: Adelaide Lightning
- 2011–2013: Dandenong Rangers
- 2013–2014: Logan Thunder
- 2014–2016: Dandenong Rangers
- 2016–2017: Melbourne Boomers

Career highlights
- WNBL champion (2012)
Medals
Representing Australia
Basketball

Tegan Cunningham (born 23 January 1988) is an Australian former sportswoman who played basketball and football. She played for the Melbourne Boomers in the Women's National Basketball League (WNBL) and played with Melbourne and Hawthorn in the AFL Women's (AFLW).

== Basketball career ==
=== College ===
Cunningham joined Seward County Community College in Liberal, Kansas. During her time there she won multiple conference and tournament MVP awards and would leave the school as the all-time leading scorer, a record still held by Cunningham. These strong showings and accolades earned her a transfer to Oklahoma State University competing in the Big 12 Conference of NCAA Division I. At the completion of her college career Cunningham was nominated for the WNBA draft where she was listed as one of the best available prospects heading in to the third and final round, however remained undrafted.

=== WNBL ===
Cunningham returned home to Australia and began her professional career in 2010, for the Adelaide Lightning. She would then move to the Dandenong Rangers and help take home the championship in the 2012 Grand Final. After a brief stint in Queensland with the Logan Thunder, she returned to the Rangers roster, after the Thunder left the league. After two seasons with the Rangers, she was signed for the 2016–17 season, by the Melbourne Boomers.

After the completion of the 2016-17 WNBL season, Cunningham would find herself without a WNBL club and decided to turn her attention to the AFLW in pursuit of a career change and a new challenge.

== Australian Rules Football ==
2018 Season

Cunningham was drafted by Melbourne with the club's third pick and the 22nd selection overall in the 2017 AFL Women's draft. She made her league debut in Round 1 of the 2018 AFLW season where she amassed 10 possessions and kicked one goal in her side's victory.

She would play in all of Melbourne's seven games despite suffering a sickening head clash in Round 5, finishing the season as the 2018 Melbourne AFLW Leading goal kicker with a total of nine goals.

2019 Season

Cunningham will return to the Melbourne AFL Women's side for season 2019 and was presented her jumper on 23 January 2019 at the club's season launch.

Cunningham was selected to play in Melbourne's Round 1 clash for 2019 against Fremantle on Sunday 3 February 2019. Cunningham will line up in the forward line.

Cunningham was reported during the Round 3 clash against the Brisbane Lions in which the Demons were victorious by 39 points. Cunningham was sighted twice for incidents on Brisbane Lions defender Shannon Campbell in the second and third quarters. The first incident included a reprimand for rough conduct with an early guilty plea, while the second incident was graded as intentional contact with medium impact for an incident off the ball which resulted in a two match ban with an early guilty plea for the striking charge.

Cunningham successfully challenged the ruling on the Tuesday at the AFLW Tribunal hearing, and was free to play in Round 4 after the conclusion of a lengthy hearing.

Cunningham was the hero in the Demons' Round 6 victory over the Western Bulldogs at Docklands Stadium when she "plucked" a strong contested mark in the dying minutes of the game. With her side trailing by five points she was able to go back and kick the winning goal from about 40 meters out (her second of the evening) with less than two minutes on the clock. The Demons were able to hold on for a famous one point victory.

Cunningham capped off her 2019 season by again topping Melbourne's goalkicking, finishing the season with a total of eight goals from her seven games. She ended the 2019 season as the Melbourne AFLW leading goalkicker of all-time through the club's inaugural three seasons. Cunningham also finished third in the Melbourne AFLW Best and Fairest vote count behind winner Karen Paxman and runner up Lauren Pearce. Cunningham didn't go home empty handed on the night though, winning the club's Best Forward player in what was a successful 2019 for Cunningham personally.

In June 2021, after playing 32 games during four seasons with Melbourne in the AFLW, Cunningham announced her retirement.

== Personal life ==
Cunningham's sibling is basketball player, Caitlin Cunningham.

== Statistics ==
Legend
G	Goals	K	Kicks	D	Disposals	T	Tackles
B	Behinds	H	Handballs	M	Marks

Season	Team	No.	Games	Totals							Averages (per game)							Votes
Season	Team	No.	Games	G	B	K	H	D	M	T	G	B	K	H	D	M	T	Votes
2018	Melbourne	1	7	9	7	33	22	55	20	11	1.3	1.0	4.7	3.1	7.9	2.9	1.6	3
2019	Melbourne	1	7	8	4	32	30	62	29	14	1.1	0.6	4.6	4.3	8.9	4.1	2.0	3
2020	Melbourne	1	7	2	4	15	17	32	10	16	0.3	0.6	2.1	2.4	4.6	1.4	2.3	0
2021	Melbourne	1	11	6	4	32	52	84	23	28	0.5	0.4	2.9	4.7	7.6	2.1	2.5	3
2022 (S7)	Hawthorn	1	8	0	1	28	18	46	16	18	0.0	0.1	3.5	2.3	5.8	2.0	2.3	0
2023	Hawthorn	1	0	—	—	—	—	—	—	—	—	—	—	—	—	—	—	0
Career			40	25	20	140	139	279	98	87	0.6	0.5	3.5	3.5	7.0	2.5	2.2	9

== Honours and achievements ==
Individual

- 2× Melbourne leading goalkicker: 2018, 2019
