= Tribal Gear =

American clothing brand

- Type: Private
- Industry: Fashion
- Founded: November 20, 1989; 36 years ago in San Diego, California, U.S.
- Founder: Bobby Ruiz
- Headquarters: San Diego, California, U.S.
- Key people: Bobby Ruiz
- Products: Apparel and Accessories
- Website: www.tribalgear.com www.tribal-streetwear.com

Tribal Gear, Tribal Streetwear or simply Tribal was launched in 1989 by Bobby Ruiz and his brother Joey as a Southern California lifestyle-inspired clothing brand.

== History ==
Bobby Ruiz started Tribal Street wear on November 20, 1989, with his brother Joey. When Bobby was looking for sponsors for a graffiti art/benefit show in San Diego, Carl Arellano, who had a silk-screening business offered to sponsor the show. "It was at that point when we became friends and started to talk about him getting involved with Tribal", says Bobby.

The process started with blank white T-shirts which were given various graphics including tattoo-style designs from Joey. Inspired by his graffiti background Bobby wanted to use bold graphics. Most graphics were Aztec and Mayan influenced. This is how they came up with the name Tribal. They started working with graffiti artists who made hip hop-style graphics. Tribal expanded from T-shirts to apparel and accessories.

== Influences ==
=== Latino community ===
Tribal Street wear is a lifestyle clothing brand that has made an impact from across the US and overseas. Tribal became popular in countries like Germany and Japan where the interest in Latino culture has paved the way for California designers to sell street wear.

Bobby wanted his clothing to appeal to a wide customer base. “We never boxed ourselves in by using one thing that we are into”, explains Bobby “We have a skate team, b-boy team, graffiti artist, and ultimate fighters”.

=== Breakdance ===
Tribal is a supporter of breaking, b-boying or commonly known as break dancing all over the world. The tough style of Tribal matches the Breakdancing aesthetics.

Over the years Tribal has sponsored breakdancing events and dancers such as Lil Rock, Moskito, Ruen, Crumbs, Lil Bob, Rainen, Franky Flav, Nabil, and Anthrax.

=== Graffiti ===
Tribal Streetwear has carried designs from popular artists including OG Abel and Mr. Cartoon from the Los Angeles lowrider scene, Daim and Seak from Germany, and Hasl, Brisk and Persué from San Diego. Over the years the lifestyle brand has provided work for as many as 200 graffiti artists.

== Tribal artists ==
=== OG Abel ===
Abel, grew up poor in a rugged section of South Central Los Angeles and lost a brother to street violence. He attended Los Angeles Trade Tech to take courses in graphic design and he's turned his hobby into a business, which has him working alongside some of the world's most power brands. From Fiat, Lowrider Magazine to Tribal and Converse.

=== Mr. Cartoon ===
Mark Machado, better known as Mister Cartoon, is a Mexican American tattoo artist and graffiti artist based in Los Angeles, California. Machado designed the logo for Cypress Hill. He has tattooed the bodies of Dr. Dre, 50 Cent, Eminem, Method Man, Gabriel McDonald, Scott Raynor, Justin Timberlake, and Beyoncé Knowles.

In addition to tattoos, Machado's work has been used by Nike, Tribal, Toyota, T-Mobile and in Grand Theft Auto.

=== Munk One ===
Munk One a.k.a. JoseMercado is a contemporary American illustrator and fine artist. He is most noted for creating artwork for bands.

== Celebrities ==
Tribal enjoys support from artists such as Rock Steady Crew, Korn, Delinquent Habits and Linkin Park. Other famous supporters of the brand include Snoop Dogg, KRS-One, Gotti, P.O.D., Limp Bizkit, Staind and Los Lobos.

== Distribution ==
The Tribal collection is sold in selected stores in Europe, Germany, Japan, Hong Kong, Taiwan, Korea, Philippines, Russia, Mexico, Colombia, New Zealand, Australia, Canada and the United States of America. In each country, there are also exclusive local designs. There is also a partnership Tribal Gear Tattoo Parlour in Hong Kong, Tribal Gear Barbers in Manila Philippines called 'Tribal Cuts', Tribal Gear Surf Fashion Shop in Yokohama, Japan, and Tribal Gear Fashion Store with Tattoo Ink department in Mexico.

== See also ==
- Hip hop fashion
- Street fashion
- Fashion design
