= Health Goth =

Fashion subculture of goth and gym wear

Health Goth is a fashion trend that emerged in the early 2010s. It blends elements of goth fashion, gym wear, and minimalist design with a focus on physical fitness and well-being.

== History ==
=== Origins ===
The term "Health Goth" originated from Mike Grabarek and Jeremy Scott (also known as Magic Fades), and artist Chris Cantino who started the original Health Goth Facebook community in 2013. They have stated, "A lot of the influence comes from HOODBYAIR, Cottweiler, Whatever 21, and A D Y N." They also claim they were attributing a name to describe a feeling that already existed. "When we started we'd just see an ad or some clothes we liked, and we'd see something dark or sexual in them that wasn't intended to be there. So really the subversive side was just portraying the ads in a new light, because we wished these aspects were intentional. Things sort of went from there." In addition to citing athletic wear, future fashion labels and the emotional spectrum, they also reference sources from other online movements and aesthetics; "It's not just the colour scheme, a lot of the stuff we post are just futuristic or healthy takes on goth style... We find equal inspiration in our Tumblr feed, where you see a lot of 3D rendered images, which have no people or clothing shown. Images of mesh, or a blade with a tribal pattern and a fern or something. It might not be evident upon looking at our page but a lot of our imagery is very Net Art inspired."

Grabarek, Cantino, and Scott have stated that Health Goth "has to do with our history of net art obsession and fascination with the rise of trans-humanism. We want to create art that references evolution and relate it back to subcultures, things like bio-enhancement technology, anti-aging medication, and how it all feeds into this ideal of "pursuing perfection". We embrace a lot of these futuristic fantasies but ultimately we all have our own fears and doubts about it. So we like to blur the edges between things that are transcendental and taboo just enough that it begs a discussion." They later stated they were "followers of the trans-humanist movement" and related their approach to a rejection of retro-fetishism: "It's pretty fantastical when it comes down to it, and some may find that too strange or taboo, but we prefer that blurry, uncomfortable space over the conventional and twee bullshit you see everywhere."

In 2024, Balenciaga was reported to reference Health Goth in its spring show in Shanghai. Later that year at the 2024 Summer Olympics, South Korean pistol shooter Kim Yeji was reported to evoke the style. In 2025, Australian basketballer Caitlin Cunningham was reported as an early adopter of the style.

== See also ==
- Cybergoth – Fashion subculture of goth and cyberpunk
