= Caitlin Cunningham =

Australian women's basketball player

- Cunningham with the Rockhampton Cyclones in 2025

Personal information
- Born: 17 January 1986 (age 40) Melbourne, Victoria, Australia
- Listed height: 192 cm (6 ft 4 in)

Career information
- Playing career: 2003–present
- Position: Centre

Career history
- 2003–2005: Australian Institute of Sport
- 2005–2006: Bulleen Boomers (WNBL)
- 2006–2007: Canberra Capitals
- 2007–2008: Nunawading Spectres
- 2008–2009: Dandenong Rangers
- 2009: Knox Raiders
- 2010–2011: Nunawading Spectres
- 2010–2011: Adelaide Lightning
- 2011–2012: Bulleen Boomers (WNBL)
- 2012: Melbourne Tigers
- 2015: Waverley Falcons
- 2018: Bulleen Boomers (Big V)
- 2019: McKinnon Cougars
- 2019: Rockhampton Cyclones
- 2021: Gold Coast Rollers
- 2022: Northside Wizards
- 2023: RedCity Roar
- 2023: Casey Cavaliers
- 2024: Kilsyth Cobras
- 2025: Rockhampton Cyclones

Career highlights
- WNBL champion (2007); All-SEABL Team (2007)

Caitlin Mary Cunningham (born 17 January 1986) is an Australian basketball player. They (Note: Cunningham uses the pronouns they/them and she. This article uses they/them for consistency.) played in the Women's National Basketball League (WNBL) between 2003 and 2012. They have also played in multiple Australian state leagues.

== Early life ==
Cunningham was born in Melbourne, Victoria, in the suburb of Fitzroy.

== Playing career ==
=== WNBL ===
Cunningham debuted in the Women's National Basketball League (WNBL) in the 2003–04 with the Australian Institute of Sport (AIS). They played a second season with the AIS in 2004–05. For the 2005–06 WNBL season, they joined the Bulleen Boomers, where they played five games.

For the 2006–07 WNBL season, Cunningham joined the Canberra Capitals. They returned to the Capitals for the 2007–08 season but left in November 2007 after seven games.

For the 2008–09 WNBL season, Cunningham joined Dandenong Rangers. They returned to the Rangers for the 2009–10 season but left after one game.

Cunningham played for the Adelaide Lightning in 2010–11 before returning to the Bulleen Boomers for the 2011–12 season.

=== State Leagues ===
Cunningham played in the South East Australian Basketball League (SEABL) for the Nunawading Spectres in 2007 and 2008, earning All-SEABL Team honours in 2007. They joined the Knox Raiders for the 2009 SEABL season. They returned to the Spectres for the 2010 and 2011 SEABL seasons.

In 2012, Cunningham played for the Melbourne Tigers in the Big V. In 17 games, they averaged 15.5 points and 8.7 rebounds per game.

In 2015, Cunningham played for the Waverley Falcons in the Big V. They returned to the Big V in 2018 with the Bulleen Boomers. They played one game for the McKinnon Cougars in the 2019 Big V season before joining the Rockhampton Cyclones for the rest of the 2019 Queensland Basketball League (QBL) season.

In 2021, Cunningham played for the Gold Coast Rollers in the NBL1 North. They joined the Northside Wizards for the 2022 NBL1 North season. After starting the 2023 NBL1 North season with the RedCity Roar, they joined the Casey Cavaliers for the rest of the NBL1 South season.

Cunningham joined the Kilsyth Cobras for the 2024 NBL1 South season.

Cunningham joined the Rockhampton Cyclones for the 2025 NBL1 North season. In June 2025, they were dubbed "Caitlin Dark", riffing off WNBA player Caitlin Clark, after they attracted global attention for their gothic look while playing for the Cyclones.

=== National team ===
Cunningham played for Australia at the 2005 FIBA Under-19 World Championship.

== Personal life ==
Cunningham's sister is dual football and basketball player, Tegan Cunningham.

Off the court, Cunningham is a musician and personal trainer. Cunningham uses they/them/she pronouns.

Cunningham has gained widespread recognition across sports, fashion, music, anime, and LGBTQ+ communities for their distinctive alternative aesthetic, androgynous style, and popularity among queer fans.

Cunningham is an early adopter of the Health Goth style. They were listed as one of Out's Most Eligible Bachelorexes in 2025.
