= Japanese street fashion =

Contemporary Japanese fashion trends

Japanese street fashion refers to a number of styles of contemporary modern clothing in Japan. Created from a mix of both local and international fashion brands, Japanese street fashions tend to have their own distinctive style, with some considered to be extreme and imaginative, with similarities to the haute couture styles seen on European catwalks.

== History ==
As early as the 1950s, there were a few brands specially catered to street fashion, such as Onitsuka Tiger (now known as ASICS).

In addition, the emergence of strong youth culture during the 1960s and 1970s that continues today (especially in Harajuku, a district in Shibuya, Tokyo) drives much of the development of new styles, looks, and fashion subcultures. The rise of consumerism, which played an important part in Japan's "national character" during its economic boom in the 1980s, continues to influence fashion purchases, even after this economic bubble burst in the 1990s. These factors result in the swift turnover and variability in styles popular at any one time.

In 2003, Japanese hip-hop, which had long been present among underground Tokyo's club scene, influenced the mainstream fashion industry. The popularity of the music was so influential that Tokyo's youth imitated their favorite hip hop stars from the way they dress with oversized clothes to tanned skin.

Though extremely popular in the 1990s and early 2000s, many trends experienced a levelling off in the later 2000s and onwards; the rise and fall of many of these trends had been chronicled by Shoichi Aoki since 1997 in the fashion magazine Fruits, which was a notable magazine for the promotion of street fashion in Japan.

== Fashion industry and popular brands ==
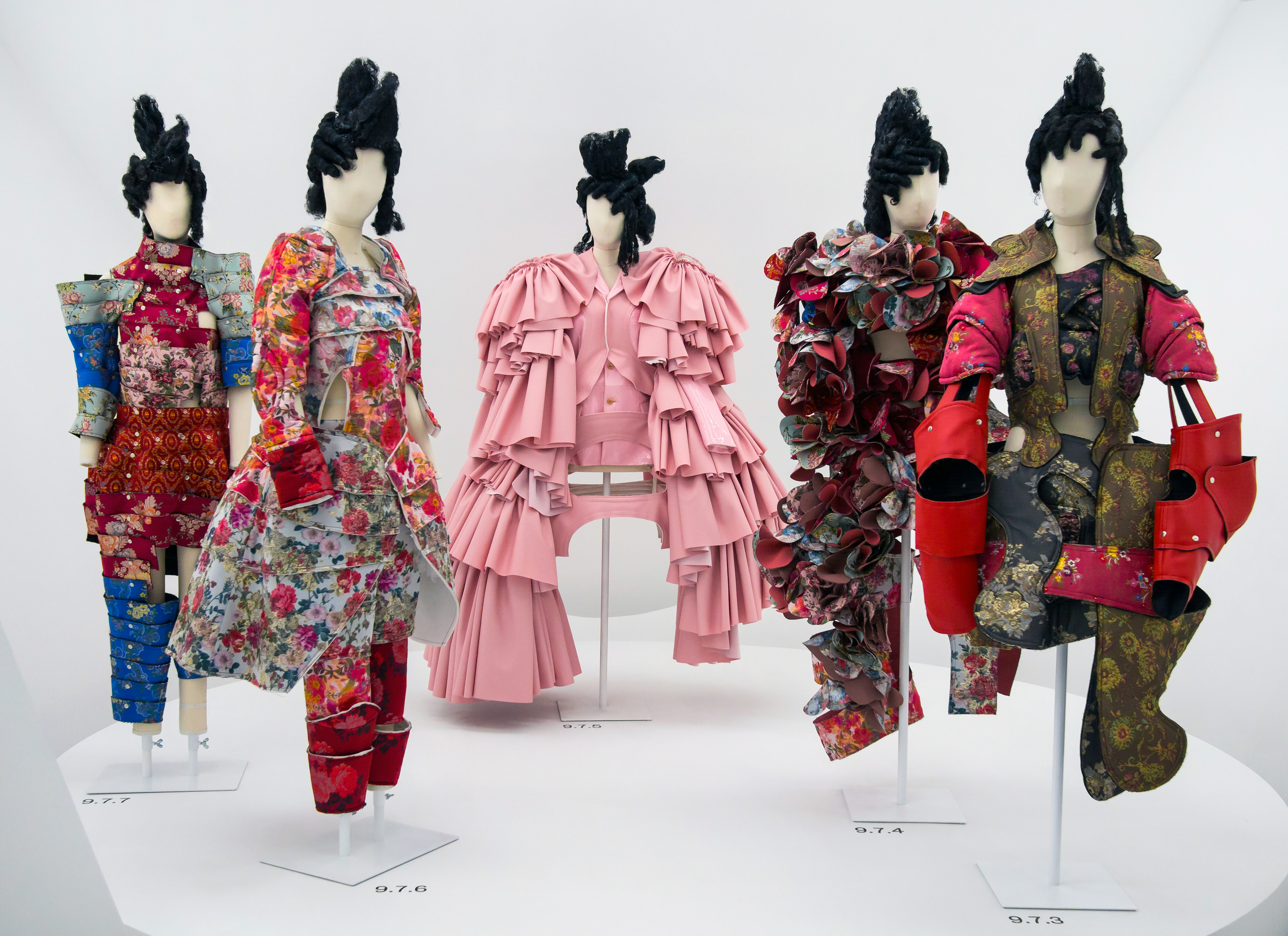
Comme des Garçons garments on display at the Metropolitan Museum of Art

Japanese street fashion encompasses a wide range of styles and does not center on a single dominant brand. Designers including Issey Miyake, Yohji Yamamoto, and Comme des Garçons became particularly influential in the early 1980's, when their work gained international attention for its use of monochrome palettes and unconventional design.

The social motives driving interaction with and involvement in personal fashion choices and wider fashion movements within Japan are complex. Firstly, the comparatively large quantity of disposable income available to Japanese youth is significant; many argue this has been, historically, made possible through a greater degree of Japanese youth living at home with their parents for much longer than in other countries, reducing living expenses and thus making larger spending on clothing possible.

Japan is also known for its significant consumption of foreign luxury brands. According to data from 2006, Japan consumed 41 percent of the entire world's luxury goods. The blue line of Burberry is among the most successful in this arena.

Japanese street fashion influences the West Coast of the United States. High-end fashion brands like Comme des Garçons have played a big role in the global industry since the 1980s, especially through frequent cross-over guest design with other brands. In 2008, Rei Kawakubo designed for Louis Vuitton and H&M. Harajuku Fashion was ranked 5th in the fashion field of Google Search of the Year in 2019.

== Modern Japanese street fashion ==
Though the styles have changed over the years, street fashion is still prominent in Tokyo today. Young adults can often be found wearing subculture attire in large urban fashion districts such as Harajuku (Ura-Harajuku), Aoyama, Ginza, Odaiba, Shinjuku, and Shibuya.

=== Lolita ===
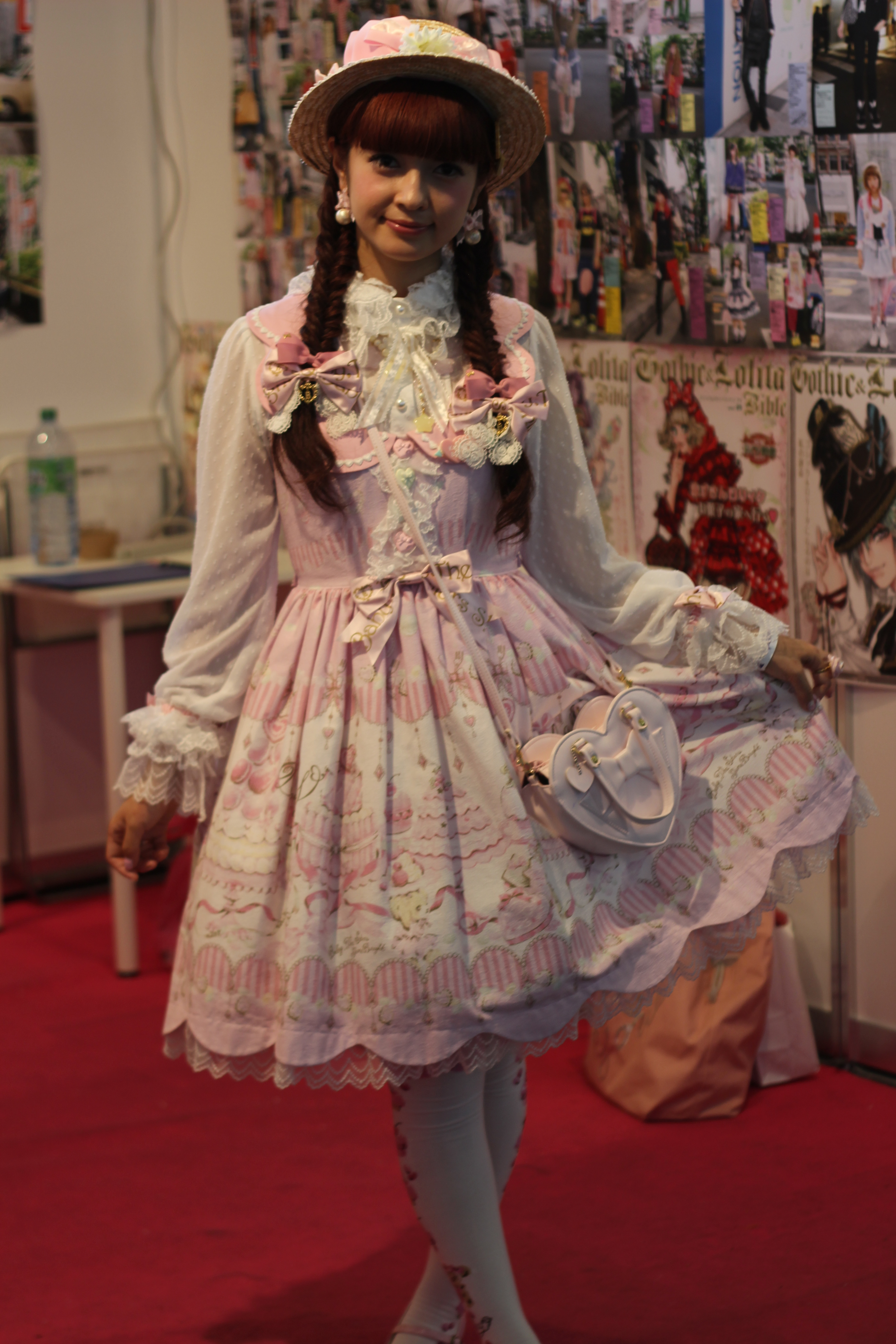
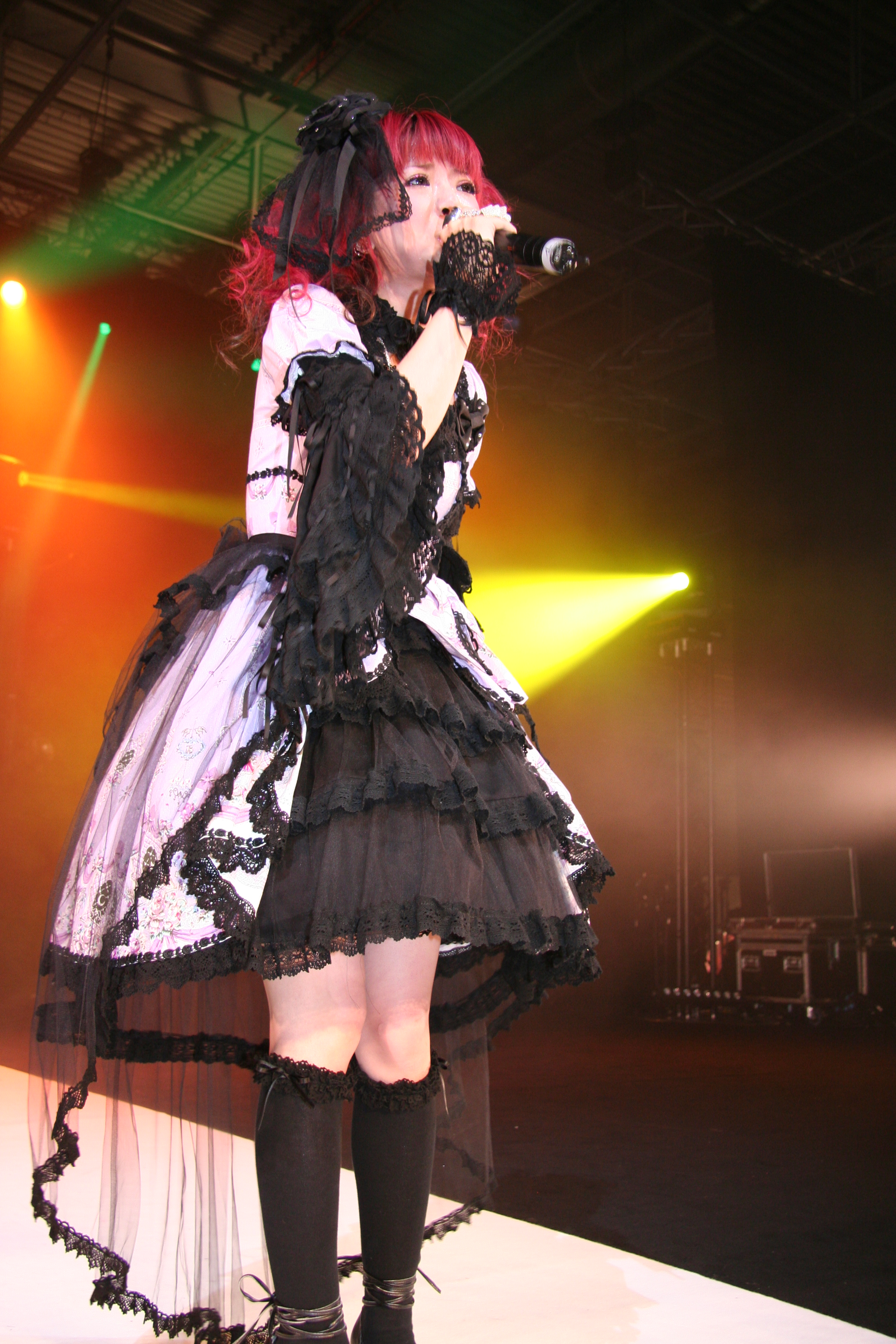
Sweet Lolita (left) and Gothic Lolita (right)

Containing many different themes within its boundaries, Lolita has become one of the larger, more recognizable styles in Japanese street fashion and has gained a following worldwide. Skirts or dresses are usually worn at or below knee length with petticoats beneath for volume. Blouses or tops are lace-trimmed or ruffled in the Victorian or Rococo style. The length of the socks or stockings can go from ankle to thigh level and may be topped with lace. Wearers of this fashion style often put on Mary Janes, tea party shoes, or boots. The more well-known sub-styles within Lolita fashion are as follows:

- Gothic Lolita - Lolita with a heavy influence from the Eastern and Victorian Goth style. Often characterized by dark colors and accessories adorned with motifs such as skeletons, bats, spiders, and other popular gothic 'icons', such as characters from Tim Burton films. Victorian iron gates and architectural designs are also often seen in dress prints. Bonnets, rectangle headdresses, and brooches are popular accessories for Gothic Lolita.
- Sweet Lolita - the most childlike style, mostly characterized by baby animals, fairy tale themes, and innocent, childlike attire. It was originally inspired by Victorian children's clothing and the kawaii culture that is very prevalent in Japan. Pastel colors are often used, although some dresses or skirts may feature darker or muted colors as well. Large head bows, cute purses, and stuffed animals are popular accessories for Sweet Lolita.
- Classic Lolita - a sub-style more closely resembling the historical fashion of the Rococo or Victorian eras. The colors that are used in this look are usually muted, thus giving this sub-style a more mature feel. Floral prints and solid colors are common, although fancier prints are not unheard of as well. Small head bows, bonnets, rectangle headdresses, and hair corsages are popular accessories for Classic Lolita.
- Punk Lolita - an experimental style, mixing the influences of Punk with Lolita. It can sometimes look deconstructed or crazy while keeping most of the 'Lolita silhouette'.
- Ouji - also known as 'boy style', are the more masculine counterparts of lolita, influenced by Victorian boys' clothing. 'Prince pants', which are short capri-style pants that are cut off the knee, usually with some sort of detail (such as lace-edged cuffs) are commonly worn with masculine blouses, top hats, knee socks, and other accessories.

=== Gyaru ===
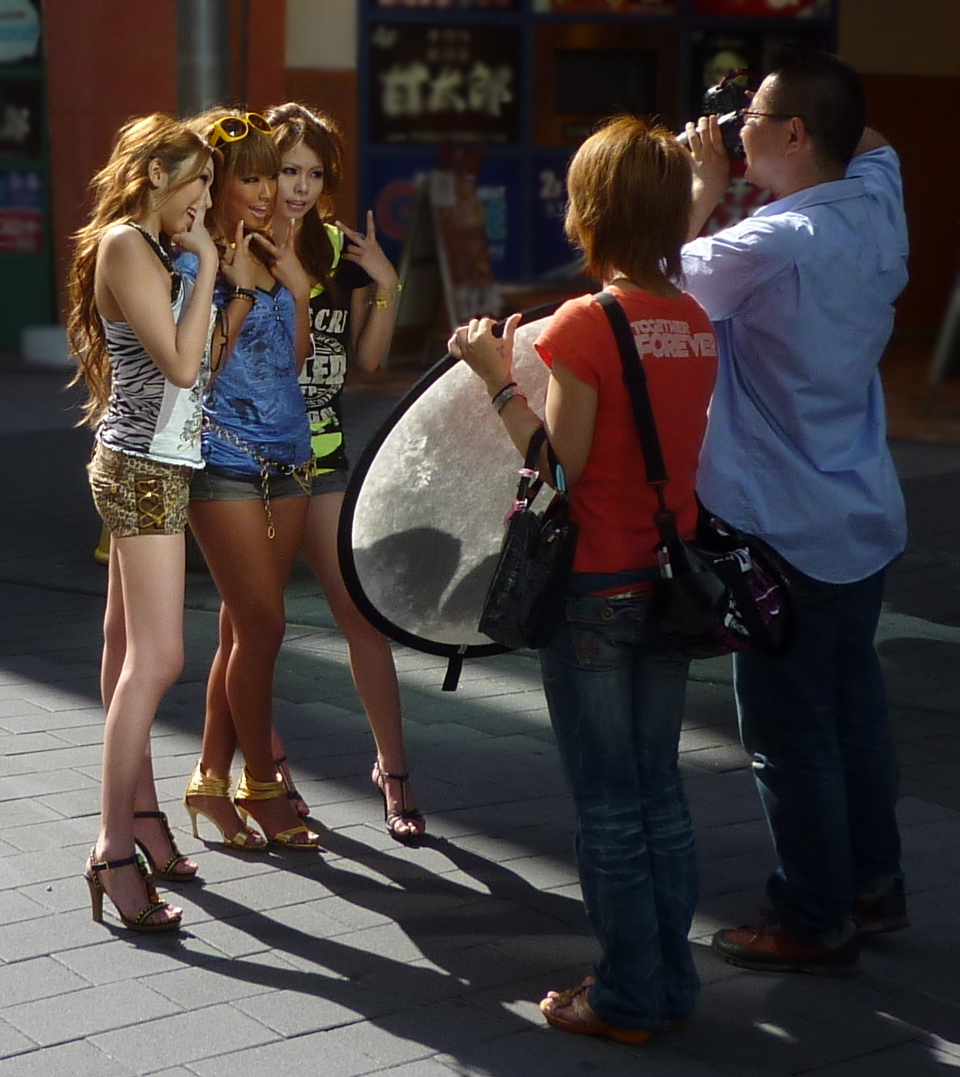
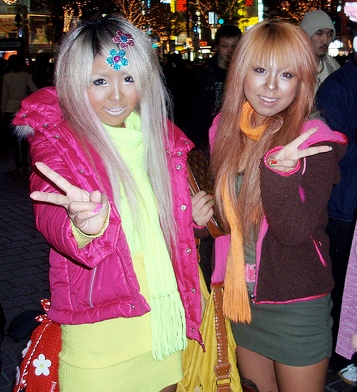
Variations of gyaru

Gyaru (sometimes mistaken as Ganguro, a substyle of gyaru) is a type of Japanese street fashion that originated in the 1970s. Gyaru focuses on girly-glam style, a rebellious attitude, and exaggerated beauty. Gyaru is also heavily inspired by Western fashion.

=== Ganguro ===
The Ganguro style of Japanese street fashion became popular among Japanese girls in the early 1990s and peaked in the early 2000s. Ganguro falls into the larger subculture of gyaru fashion. Ganguro typically includes brightly colored outfits, mini-skirts, and tie-dyed sarongs. The ganguro style consists of bleached hair, a deep tan, black and white eyeliner, bracelets, earrings, rings, necklaces, and platform shoes.

Many people consider Namie Amuro to have been the leading figure of ganguro style. Exactly after her public appearances with tanned skin and dyed hair, a lot of Japanese girls started to follow her example. The terms "Yamanba" and "Manba" refer to the extreme ends of the Ganguro style. However, enthusiasts of both the Yamanba and Manba styles consider ganguro as an "easy version" of their style. Nowadays, the name 'Yamanba' has shortened to 'Manba'.

=== Kogal ===
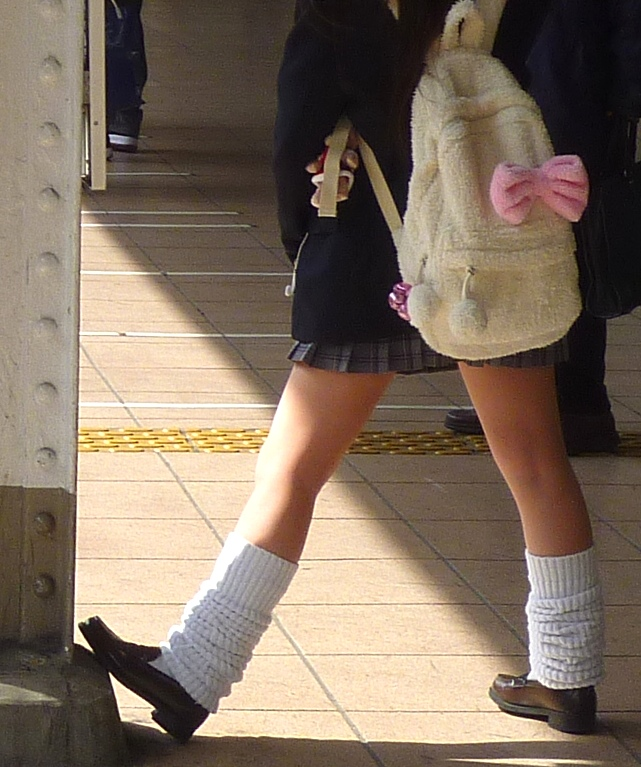
A kogal identified by her loose socks and shortened skirt

The Kogal (Kogyaru) look is based on a high school uniform, but with a shorter skirt, loose socks, and often dyed hair and a scarf as well. Members of the Kogal style sometimes refer to themselves as Gyaru (gals). This style was prominent in the 1990s, and it started gaining popularity again at the end of 2020. It is an age category specifically for girls in high school.

=== Bōsōzoku ===
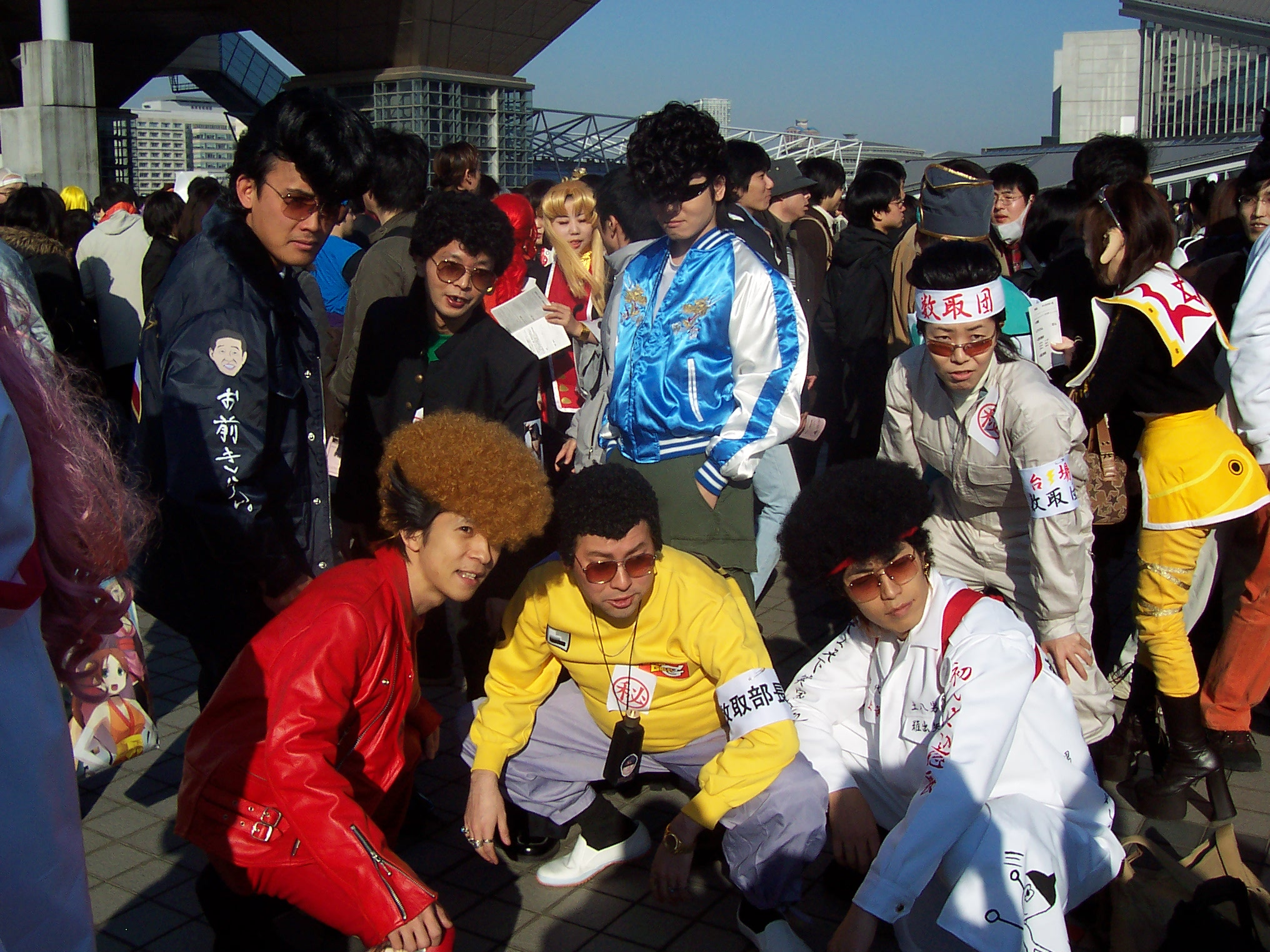
Japanese cosplayers dressed up in bōsōzoku-style outfits

While bōsōzoku fashion has not been widely popular since the 1990s, the stereotypical Bōsōzoku look is often portrayed, and even caricatured, in many forms of Japanese media such as anime, manga, and films. The typical bōsōzoku member is often depicted in a uniform consisting of a jumpsuit like those worn by manual laborers or a tokko-fuku (特攻服), a type of military issued over-coat with kanji slogans. These are usually worn open, with no shirt underneath, showing off bandaged torsos and matching baggy pants tucked inside tall boots.

=== Amekaji ===
Amekaji is a style based on American casual, often narrowly defined as Western/Native American/Biker-based. Amekaji was introduced to the public in the early 1990s by a group of delinquents in Shibuya known as "Teamer". Later, it was popularized by Takuya Kimura, who wore it in his TV dramas.

=== Decora Kei ===
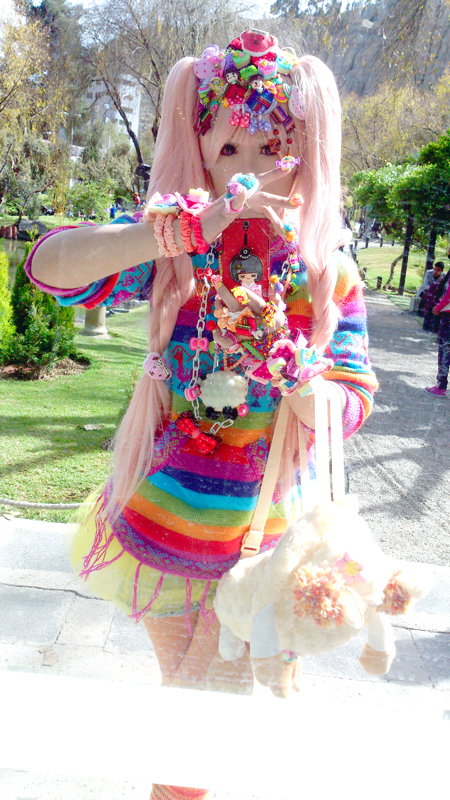
Example of Decora fashion

The Decora Kei style originated in the late 1990s/early 2000s and rose to great popularity both in and outside Japan. It is exemplified by singer Kyary Pamyu Pamyu, who rose to prominence in the Harajuku fashion scene before her musical debut. Wearers usually stick to a specific, monochrome color scheme for their outfits. A plain shirt and hoodie are often worn with short, tutu-like skirts. The hair (often worn in low ponytails with long bangs) and make-up itself tend to be quite plain. However, the most significant part of Decora Kei is to pile on many layers of accessories, such as jewellery, clips, and belts. Stockings, legwarmers, arm warmers, and knee socks are also worn over each other in different layers. Common details also include leopard prints and patterned dental masks. The style has since decreased in popularity, but still has a large following worldwide.

=== Visual Kei ===
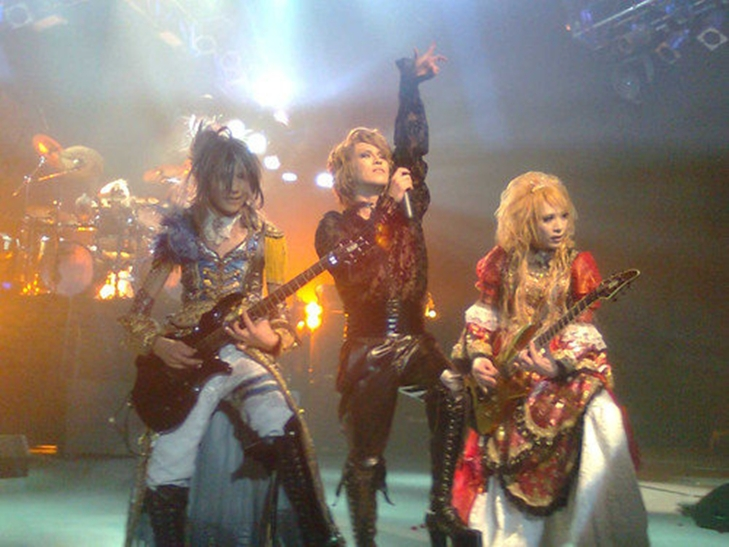
Visual kei band Versailles

Visual Kei is a subculture created in the mid-1980s by Japanese musicians consisting of striking makeup, unusual hair styles, and flamboyant costumes, similar to Western glam rock and glam metal. Androgyny is also a popular aspect of the style. Some of the more well-known and influential artists of the style include X Japan, Luna Sea, Versailles, The Gazette, Mejibray, Royz, L'Arc-en-Ciel, An Cafe, Malice Mizer, and Diaura.

=== Oshare Kei ===
Oshare Kei is the opposite side of Visual Kei, with bright colors and many pop impressions. This said, bands under this style live up to the meaning by dressing up in colorful costumes, or in Decora or Pop Kei style; many are seen sporting large amounts of jewelry and bags of anime characters and animals slung on, many colorful hairclips, and lighter make-up. The music is more happy sounding, the lyrics lighter and happier. Bands include An Cafe, Panic Channel, Ichigo69, Lolita23q, Sug, Delacroix, LM.C, and Aicle.

=== Angura Kei ===
Angura Kei is a dark Japanese fashion that is often associated with a subgenre of Visual Kei. The term derives from the Japanese pronunciation of "underground", which refers to its origins in underground theater. The clothes tend to be heavily influenced by traditional Japanese elements as well as the Showa era (1926–1989) but with a Goth spin to it. The make-up usually consists of shironuri and is dark and heavy. While kimono is the most commonly used by visual kei artists, the style also often features modified Japanese school uniforms. Motifs and accessories are themed around post-war Japan and the occult.

=== Cult Party Kei ===
Cult Party Kei, named after the Harajuku shop Cult Party (now known as the Virgin Mary), is a style that was popular around the early 2010s and is based on Western religious artifacts like crosses or bibles. Common aspects include crosses wired in yarn, layers of fabric in soft colors, lots of cream lace and satin bows. The make-up and hairstyle is not as over the top as other styles. Cult Party Kei is often worn with natural-looking make-up without any larger emphasis on the eyes and simple hair-dos with roses. Cult Party Kei is considered by some to be a subset of Dolly Kei.

=== Dolly Kei ===
Dolly Kei is a style based on Japan's view of the Middle Ages and European fairy tales, especially the Brothers Grimm and Hans Christian Andersen. It includes a lot of vintage-style clothing and sometimes has religious symbols. Grimoire is a store in Japan that has been described as "the pioneering store behind the Dolly-kei fashion scene".

=== Fairy Kei ===
Fairy Kei is a youthful style based on 1980s fashion that evokes a dreamy, nostalgic feeling. Outfits are made up of pastel colors, angels, toys and generally cute motifs and elements and accessories from Western toy lines of the 1980s and early 1990s, such as Polly Pocket, My Little Pony, Strawberry Shortcake, Rainbow Brite, Popples, Lady Lovely Locks, Barbie, Wuzzles, and Care Bears. Pastel-colored hair is common, although natural hair is also popular, and hairstyles are usually kept simple and decorated with anything cute or pastel; bows are a common theme. Some common items used in a Fairy Kei coordinate include vintage sweaters, cardigans, varsity jackets, tutus, mini skirts, tights, over-the-knee socks, sneakers, and tea party shoes. The term "Fairy Kei" originated from the magazine called Zipper (despite a common belief that Sayuri Tabuchi [Tavuchi], the owner of Tokyo fashion store Spank!, was the accidental creator of the style).

=== Girly Kei ===
Girly Kei is a hyperfeminine Japanese fashion style that emphasizes a cute and girlish appearance. Girly Kei tends to focus on lace, ribbons and ruffles, as well as a palette of soft and pastel colors. There are many substyles and the popular image can vary depending on the current trends in the style.

=== Mori Kei ===
Mori Kei (mori meaning "forest") uses soft, loosely fitting layers of garments such as floaty dresses and cardigans. It places an emphasis on natural fabrics (cotton, linen, wool) and hand-made or vintage accessories with a nature theme. The color scheme tends to be light and neutral, but patterns such as gingham and florals may also be used. In terms of hairstyles, bangs (often curled) and braids are very popular. The style is similar to Dolly Kei in that the aim is to create a doll-like appearance but in a more casual, earthy manner.

=== Jirai Kei ===
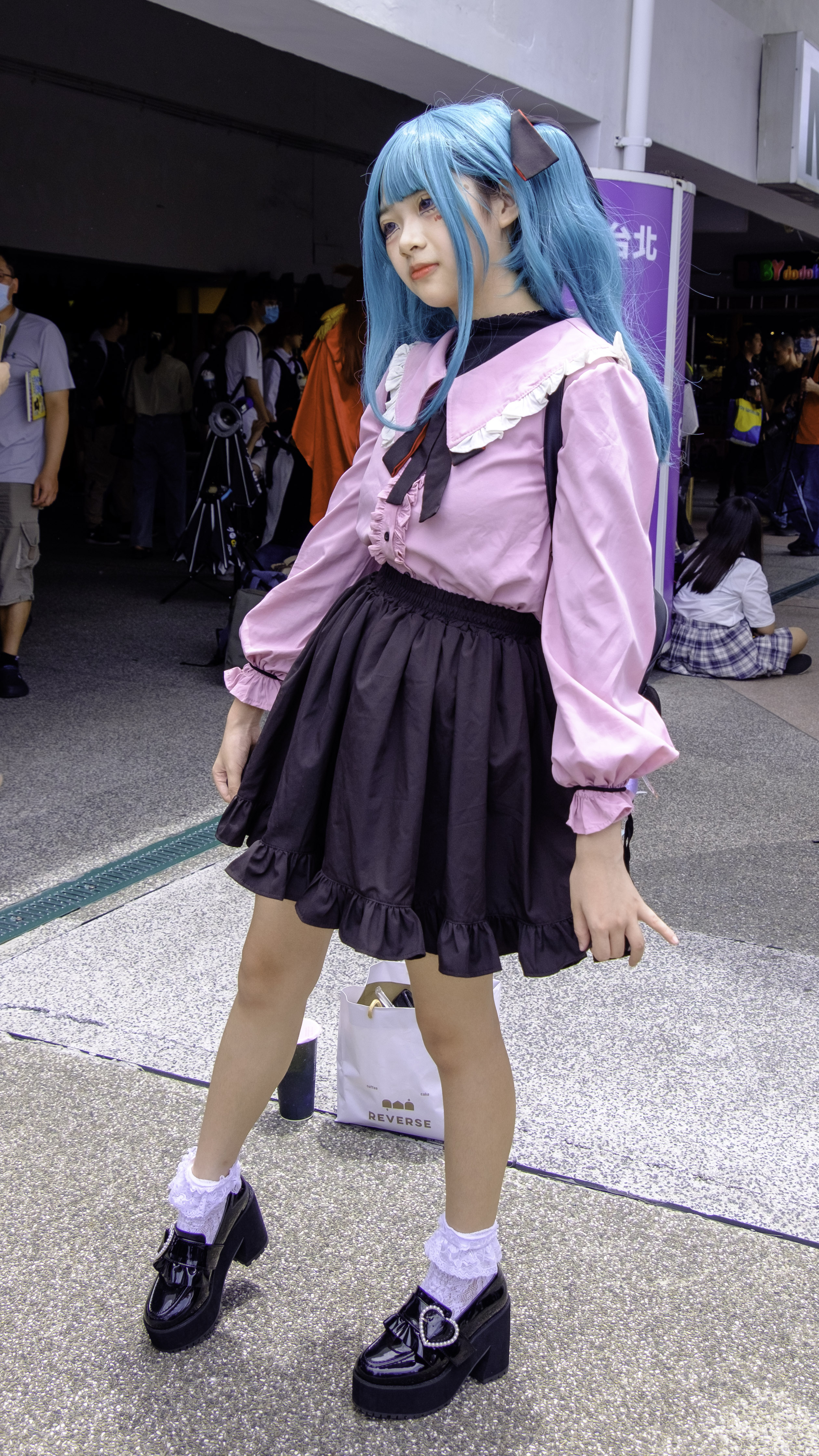
A Hatsune Miku cosplayer wearing Jirai Kei

Jirai Kei is the edgier counterpart to the aforementioned Girly Kei fashion style. Jirai Kei, literally meaning "landmine type", is a fashion subculture originating from Japan's Kabukichō and spread in popularity in the early 2020s. The term jirai was originally used as an insult to women who had this "landmine" personality. However, these girls would eventually adopt the word for themselves and name the style after it. It incorporates dark and kawaii styles. Described as similar to Lolita and preppy fashions in clothing, it is often paired with accessories that have bow, heart, cross, or lace elements. Platform shoes are a common sight as well. It highlights femininity, cuteness, and fosters a sense of loveliness with the perfect balance of cool. The stereotype behind this subculture is that cute, hyper-feminine young women who dress in darker fashion styles have personalities that do not match their appearance.

Girly fashion has a wide range of different clothing types, like Girly Kei, Jirai Kei fashion has been met by widespread social prejudice, directed towards those who wear Jirai Kei and their lifestyle choices not just about being what western society thinks of as feminine. It highlights lace, ribbons, ruffles, and playful patterns like hearts, with soft pastel pinks as the main focus, perfectly balanced by striking blacks.

=== PEEPS ===
PEEPS is a 90s-inspired sporty goth style that has been popularized in Harajuku's underground scene by the online magazine PEEPS. It was voted one of the major trends for 2020 in the yearly trend forecast by the Japanese women's magazine Mery.

=== Genderless ===
In the mid-2010s, genderless fashion became widespread and focused on people wearing clothing that did not conform to their gender. The subculture is mostly dominated by men, who are known as "genderless men."

== Designers featured at international fashion weeks ==
- Tomoko Yamanaka's work was featured at London Fashion Week, 2010.

== See also ==
- Deconstruction (fashion)
- 2000s in Japanese fashion
- 2010s in Asian fashion
- Youth culture
- Camp (style)
- Fruits
- Cuteness in Japanese culture
- Madam/Aristocrat
- Elegant Gothic Aristocrat
- Neo-Victorian
- Cosplay
- Visual Kei
- Poupee Girl
- Baby, the Stars Shine Bright
- Angelic Pretty
- Gyaru
