= Aristocrat (fashion) =

Japanese street fashion

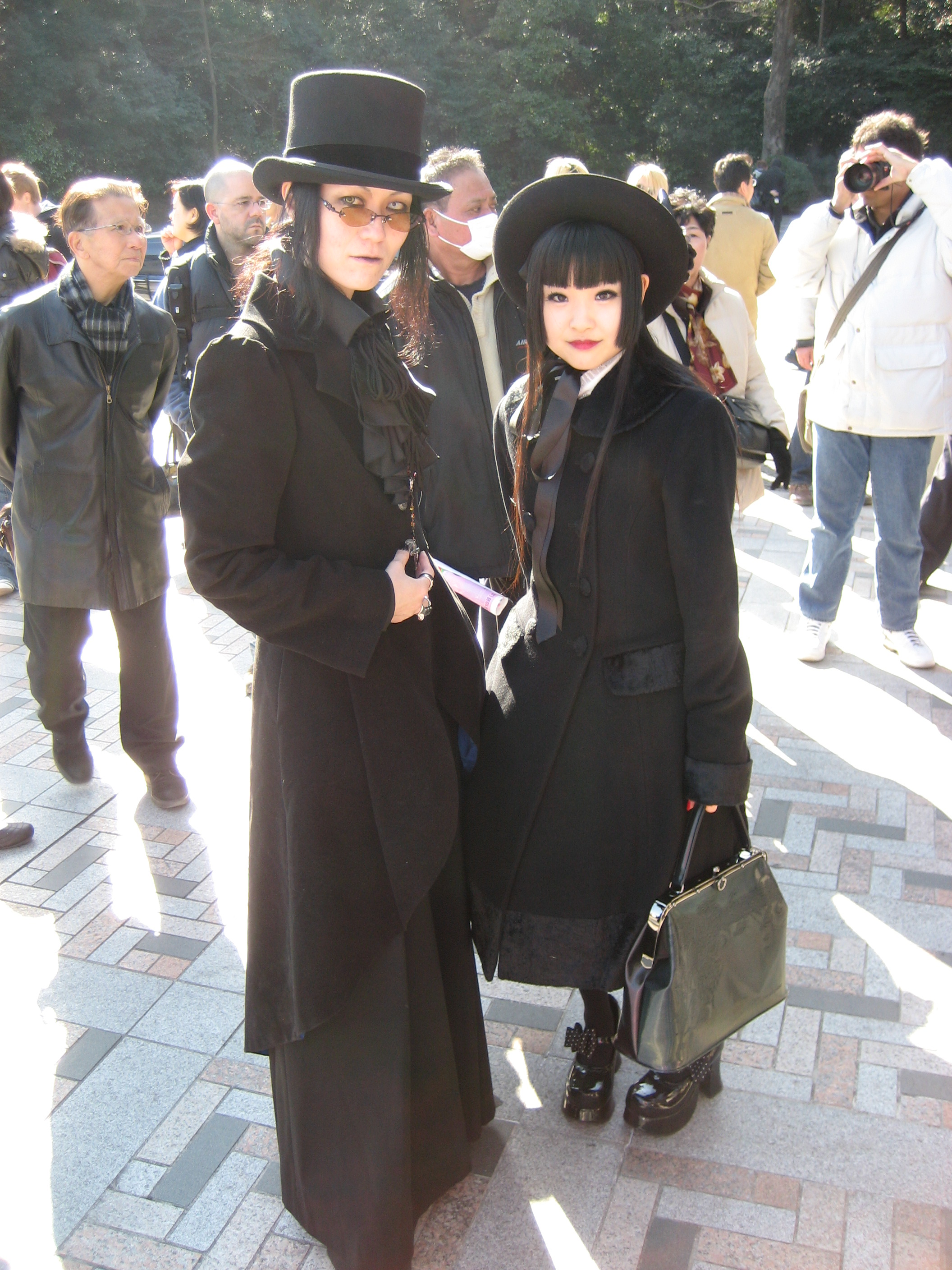
A classic lolita (right) and an aristocrat (left)

Aristocrat is a Japanese street fashion that is inspired by what is thought to have been worn by middle class and higher social status Europeans in the Middle Ages, as well as the upper class in the 19th century. This fashion includes long sleeve blouses and shirts, long skirts, corsetry, trousers and dresses that are styled in a similar way for men and women, because it is centred on androgyny and elegance. Most aristocrat fashion takes heavy influence from gothic fashion. Makeup, when worn with the fashion, is on the darker side, may be heavy, and can be worn without regard to gender.

Elegant Gothic Aristocrat (EGA) is a term coined by Mana, a fashion designer and band leader of Moi dix Mois (formerly of Malice Mizer), and is used to describe his brand of clothing carried in his store Moi-même-Moitié.

== See also ==
- Japanese street fashion
- Lolita fashion
- Ganguro
- Kogal
- Cosplay
- Visual kei
- Neo-Victorian
- Steampunk
