= Shoichi Aoki =

Japanese photographer

Shoichi Aoki (青木 正一, Aoki Shōichi; born 1955) is a former computer programmer, now Japanese photographer, and creator of the magazines STREET, TUNE, and FRUiTS. He also subsequently created the Fruits and Fresh Fruits (collections of Japanese street fashion) photo books as a way of offering his photos to the foreign market.

== Life and work ==
Aoki was born in Tokyo. He went abroad in the 1980s, where he first started taking photos of London's nonconforming street fashion scene. Aoki then moved back to Tokyo, where he started STREET magazine in 1985. He began documenting street fashion in Tokyo's fashionable Harajuku area in the mid-1990s when he noticed a marked change in how young people dressed. Rather than following European and American trends, people were customizing elements of traditional Japanese dress—kimono, obi sashes, and geta sandals—and combining them with handmade, secondhand, and alternative designer fashion in an innovative DIY approach to dressing.

In 1997, Aoki founded the monthly magazine FRUiTS, now a cult fanzine with an international following, to record and celebrate the freshness of fashion in Harajuku.

== Publications ==
=== Magazines ===
- STREET (began in 1985)
- FRUiTS. (began in 1997)
- TUNE (began in 2004)
- .RUBY (began in 2012)

=== Books ===
- Fruits. Phaidon, 2001. ISBN 978-0-7148-4083-3.
- Fresh Fruits. Phaidon, 2005. ISBN 978-0-7148-4510-4.
- Street London 1985-1996. 2017.
