= Street style =

Fashion movement based on individualism

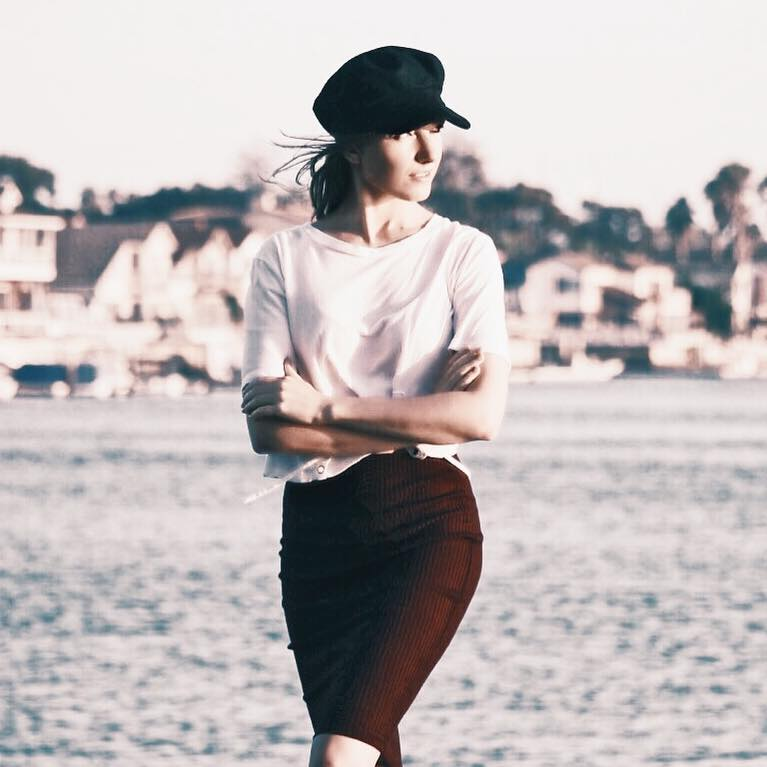
Model in a modern look reflecting street style fashion, Los Angeles, 2019

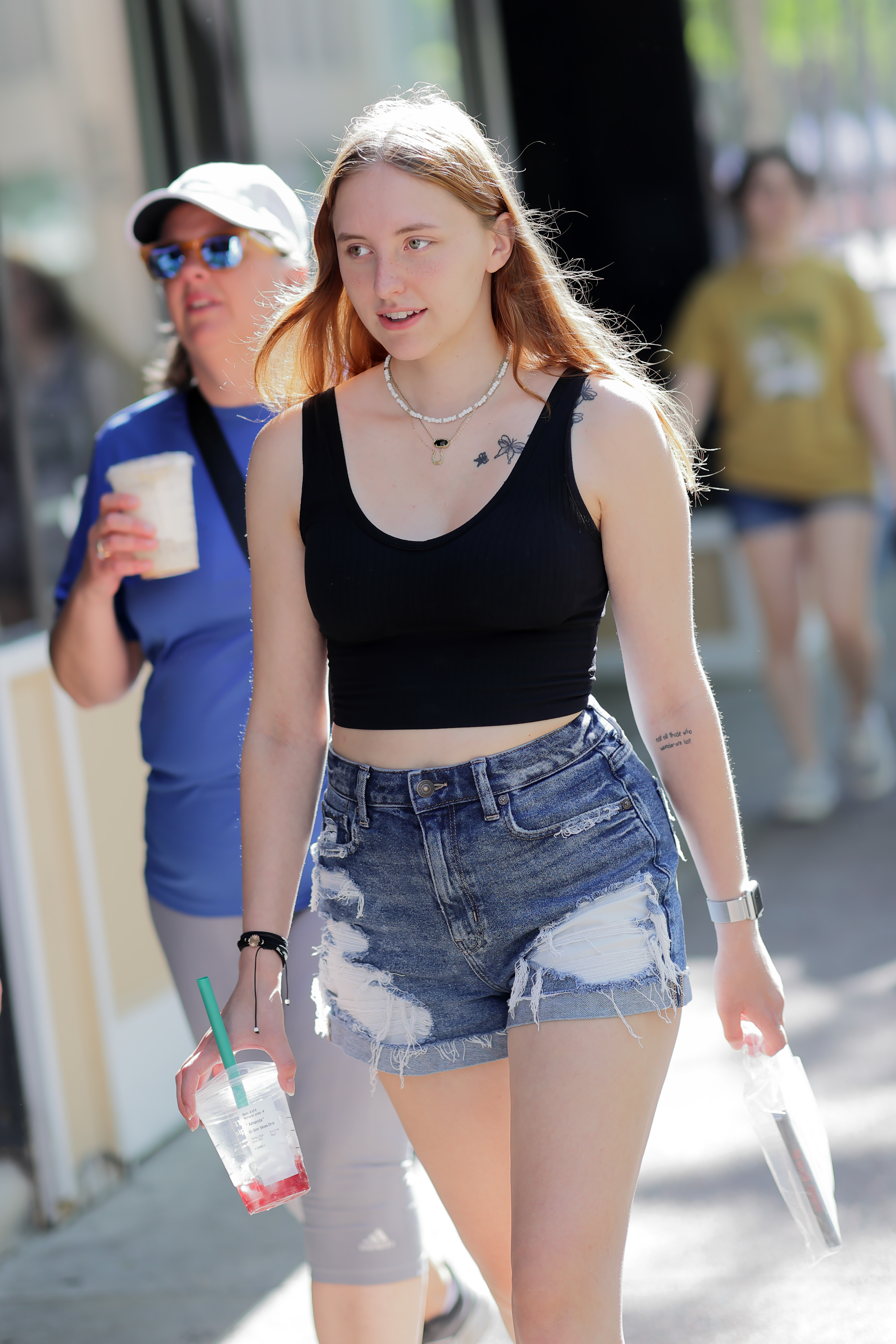
Street fashion in the USA, 2024

Street style is fashion that is considered to have emerged not from studios, but from the population at large. Street fashion is generally associated with youth culture, and is most often seen in major urban centers. Magazines and newspapers commonly feature candid photographs of individuals wearing urban, stylish clothing. Mainstream fashion often appropriates street fashion trends as influences. Most major youth subcultures have had an associated street fashion. Street style is different all around the globe.

== Description ==
The "street" approach to style and fashion is often based on individualism, rather than focusing solely on current fashion trends. Using street style methods, individuals demonstrate their multiple, negotiated identities, in addition to utilizing subcultural and intersecting styles or trends. Street style can be considered a performance, as it creates a space where identities can be explored through the act(ion) of dress.

Bill Cunningham for The New York Times pointed street style out as a keen catalogue of ordinary people's clothing. Cunningham stated that streets tell a great deal about fashion and people, if one listens. According to him the best fashion show is coming to life every day on the streets.

Street style has significantly influenced the state of how clothing is designed and manufactured. While its rapid evolution is closely related to consumerism, street style often pushes back against fast fashion by shifting how people buy and wear garments.

== Development ==
Street style has always existed, but it became a phenomenon in the 20th century. The increase in the standardization of life after World War II (suburbanization, mass marketing, the spread of television) may be linked to the appeal of "alternative" lifestyles for individuals in search of "identity". Industrial production, particularly in the sphere of fashion, was not only the popularization of stylists' tastes that move from high fashion, through prêt-à-porter, to the peripheries of the system. These were also tastes that originated among economically disfavored, marginal groups, the whole range of metropolitan tribes, that are able to trigger new fashion production and diffusion processes.

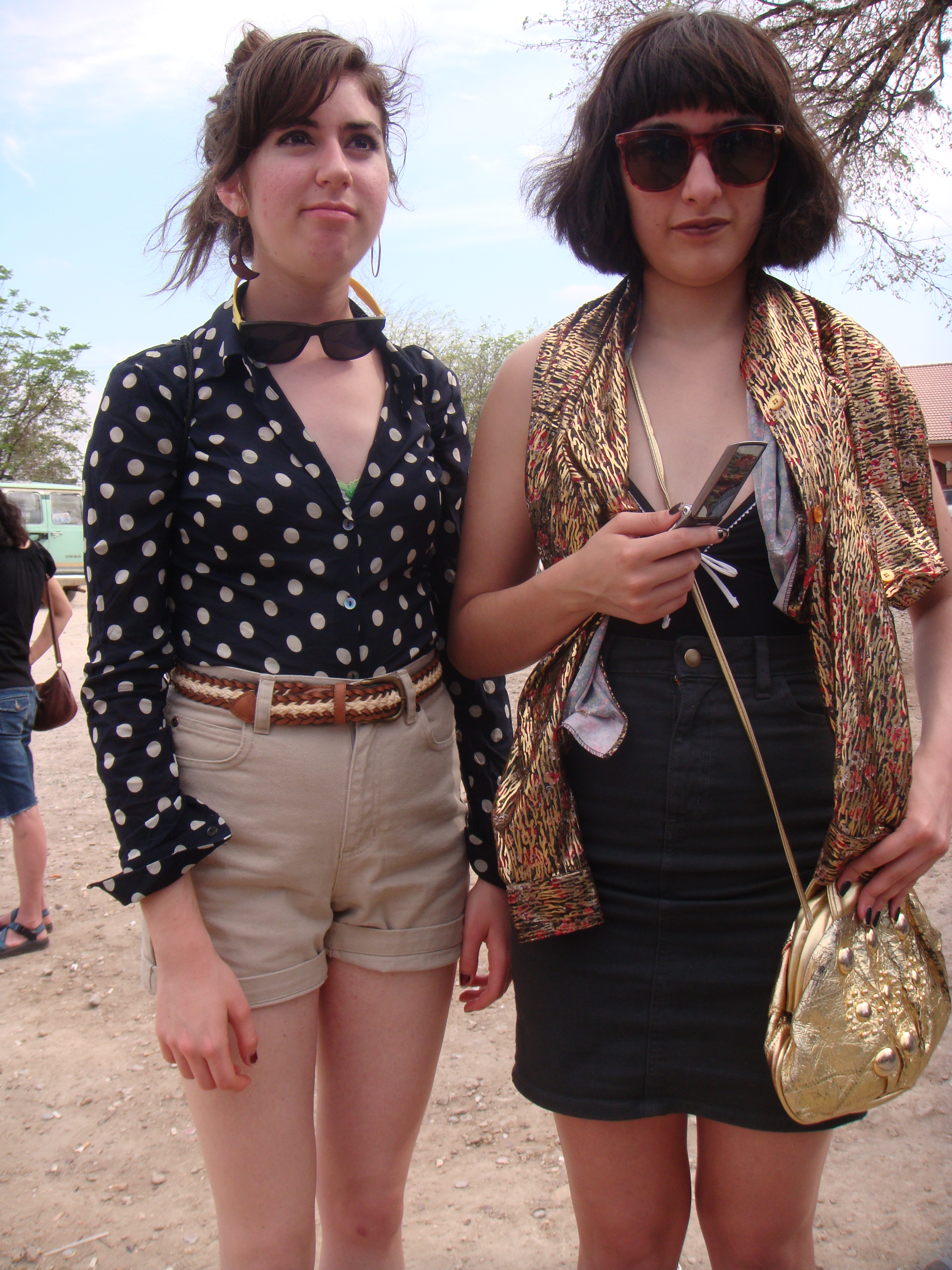
Hipster girls

Phenomena of this kind have been studied in England to reveal the importance of young people's street styles during the post-war period. It can be linked to the generation of baby boomers that represented a new sociocultural category—the "teenager"—who has money to spend and be an important motivation on economic and cultural world.

The history of identity and the history of clothing directly correlate with each other. In this connection, street style works as a facilitator of group identity and subcultural cohesion. Since the close of World War II, Western culture has seen a dramatic decline in the significance of the traditional sociocultural divisions such as race, religion, ethnicity, regionalism, nationalism, in defining and limiting personal identity. The tribe groupings, such as bikers, beats, and teddy boys in the 1950s; mods, hippies, and skinheads in the 1960s; headbangers, punks, and b-boys in the 1970s; and goths, new age travelers and ravers in the 1980s got dressed in uncommon body decoration as an expression to create a sense of identity.

In the first half of the twentieth century, although the unaccompanied figure of the woman in the street was seen increasingly in fashion photographs, she often remained bound by the pursuits of a bourgeois existence, with the reality of the street beautified as a fantasy prop for high-end fashion. As an object of gaze, her position contrasted with that of the flâneur and the male privileged code of visual spectatorship. It was not until the post-war period, with the emergence of style-conscious magazines aimed at men, that the image of the flaneur, somewhat melded with the more modern notion of the "man about town", began to be visualized in fashion photography. Masculinity was shown to be influenced by the industrial atmosphere of the metropolis. This is illustrated by Terence Donovan's grainy black-and-white photographs of sharply suited men in "Spy Drama" for the October 1962 issue of Town which became famous as the visual influence for the filmic interpretation of James Bond. In this period, the representation of the woman in the street was radicalized by the emergence of youth as a social category and its claiming of street culture as its primary context.

=== Influence of sportswear ===
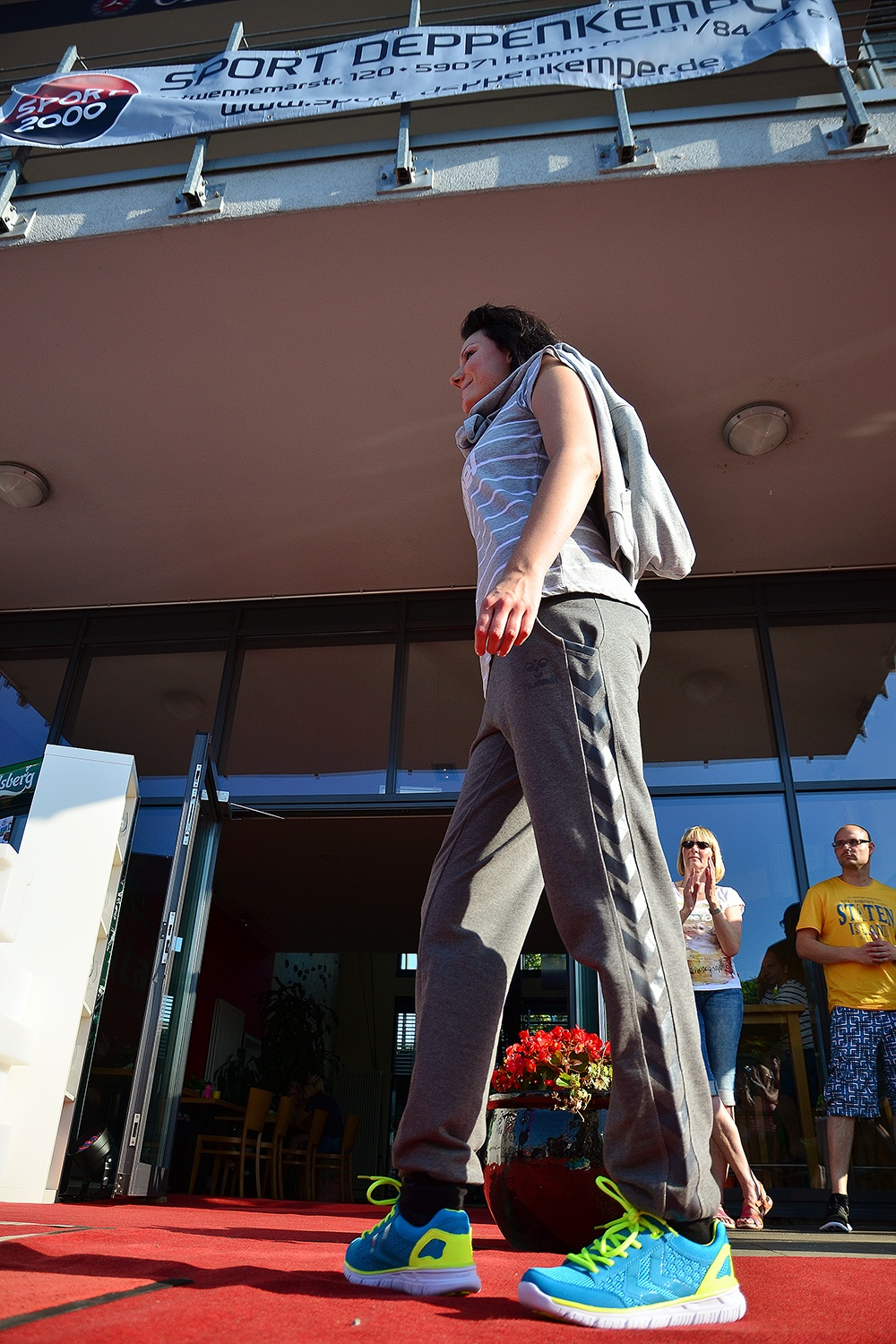
Influence of sport practices

Street style includes ordinary people who regularly wear sportswear. However, it is promoted by supermodels who work for various sportswear brands which can influence ordinary people to wear sportive clothing.

Skateboarding particularly influenced the forming of certain street styles. The image of the street style follower often corresponds with skateboarding. Skate shoes that keep the feet from slipping on the board have been adopted by people who do not skateboard.

== Key sites ==
Designers, street style activists, trendsetters, bloggers, fashion retailers and models influence a city's representation. These trends can mark shopping areas and entertainment locations. From the interdisciplinary perspective of consumption and consumer practices, city tourism is connected to city branding, through which a city's representation is aimed at attracting visitors and consumers.

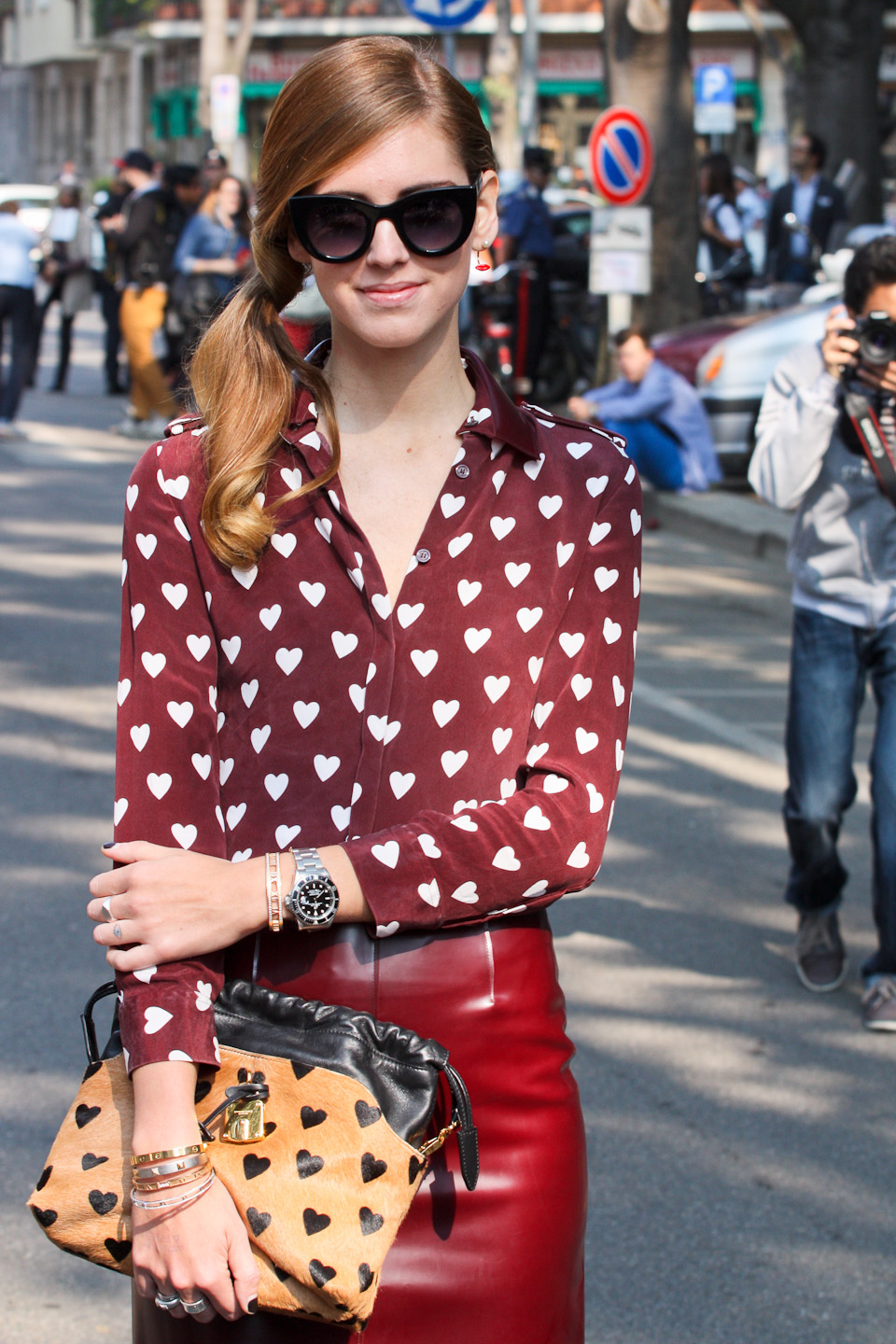
Street style in Milan

=== Milan ===
Milan has several important fashion institutions, agencies and events, including Milan Fashion Week. The expression 'capitale della moda' (the capital of fashion) refers to Milan when describing styles, urban life, fashion collections, and designers, motivating other cities to compete for this fashion, branded city status.

=== Paris ===
Paris's look can be considered through frameworks of fashion fads, designers, a chic and luxury capital, artists and a bohemian lifestyle. Paris is an example of creating the 'city look', a collective image – certain fashion garments, specifics and lifestyles embody definite urbanity in a city's context. For instance, an image of 'La Parisienne', – the typical Parisian woman – consists not only of clothing but of certain manners, values and behavioural patterns associated with the country and its citizens. One of the most typical associations with Paris is that it is the city of love and fashion, a romantic city full of chic and luxury. The fashion phenomenon can provide strong associations and a clear understanding of Paris as a centre of fashion, love and dreams.

=== Japan ===
Japanese fashion has inspired many fashion professionals in the West, starting with Kenzō Takada's appearance in Paris in 1970 followed by Issey Miyake in 1973, Hanae Mori in 1977, Yohji Yamamoto and Rei Kawakubo of Comme des Garçons in 1981. Japan is gradually becoming a country that is a genuine force in the field of fashion. Today's Japanese fashion contributes both to the aesthetics of fashion as well as to how business is made in this industry.

Japanese street fashion sustains multiple diverse fashion movements at any given time. It does not come from the famous professional Japanese designers, but is led by high school girls who have become influential in controlling fashion trends. Japanese street fashion emerges from the social networks among different institutions of fashion as well as various street subcultures, each of which is identified with a unique and original look. These teens rely on a distinctive appearance to proclaim their symbolic, subcultural identity. This identity is not political or ideological; it is simply innovative fashion that determines their group affiliation.

=== London ===
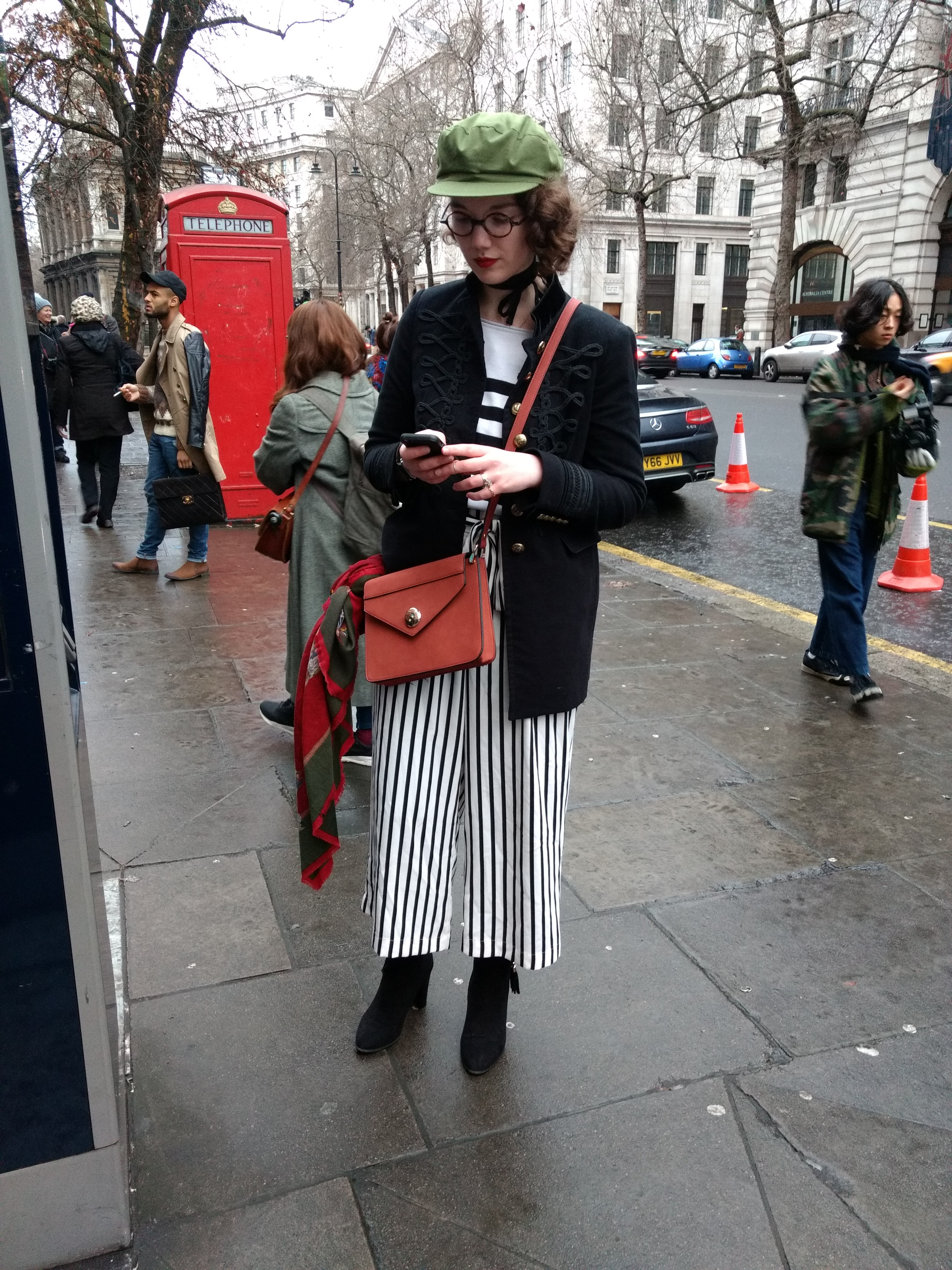
Street style in London

London is considered a significant fashion capital, but in contrast to Milan and Paris, London's look is closer to the fashion sense of royalty, traditions and strong street style culture. The city was a pioneer in the development and promotion of second-hand markets and underground tendencies in street style. Being a multinational city with a diverse cultural background, London is identified as a space where street style embodies not only the general popular fashion concepts, but also works as a tool to express social and cultural identity.

Another important aspects of London's distinctive image is the recent collaboration between the Duchess of Cambridge and Alexander McQueen fashion brand. Clothes produced for the Duchess can be called revolutionary in a certain sense, as they are woman-friendly, less pretentious and dramatic. This speaks about a certain democratization of the brand, that becomes more affordable for common consumers and perceived as a street style item rather than high fashion royal attribute.

One of the major reasons London has proved itself as a street style centre in Europe is that British fashion players are seen as more open and flexible in terms of innovative approaches to fashion and cooperation with young promising talents. This attitude creates more open-mindedness and affability with regard to street style and promotion of sustainable fashion practices.

=== New York ===
The practice of photo shooting models, still in runway makeup, in front of open warehouse spaces and garages or just on the street came from the fashion capital of the United States. Starting with the Gibson Girl of the 1890s, the free-spirited Flapper fashions of the 1920s, and the rugged, masculine work-wear of the 1930s and 40s, American culture has been especially influential in the creation of street style, with music movements like jazz, rock, disco, and hip hop, American sports and recreational pursuits like basketball, baseball, motorcycle riding, surfing and skateboarding, countercultural movements like the hippy movement, punk, grunge and associated "anti-fashion", and image-based cultural industries like Hollywood all having exerted a significant amount of influence on New York's fashion and design.

New York Fashion Week was the world's first fashion week. Historic fashion magazines like Vogue, Harper's Bazaar, and Cosmopolitan have been the world's pre-eminent fashion publications for over a century. Neighborhoods like the East Village, Greenwich Village, and Williamsburg, Brooklyn have been hot spots for street style, the latter having helped give rise to the hipster revival of the 2000s and 2010s.

=== India ===
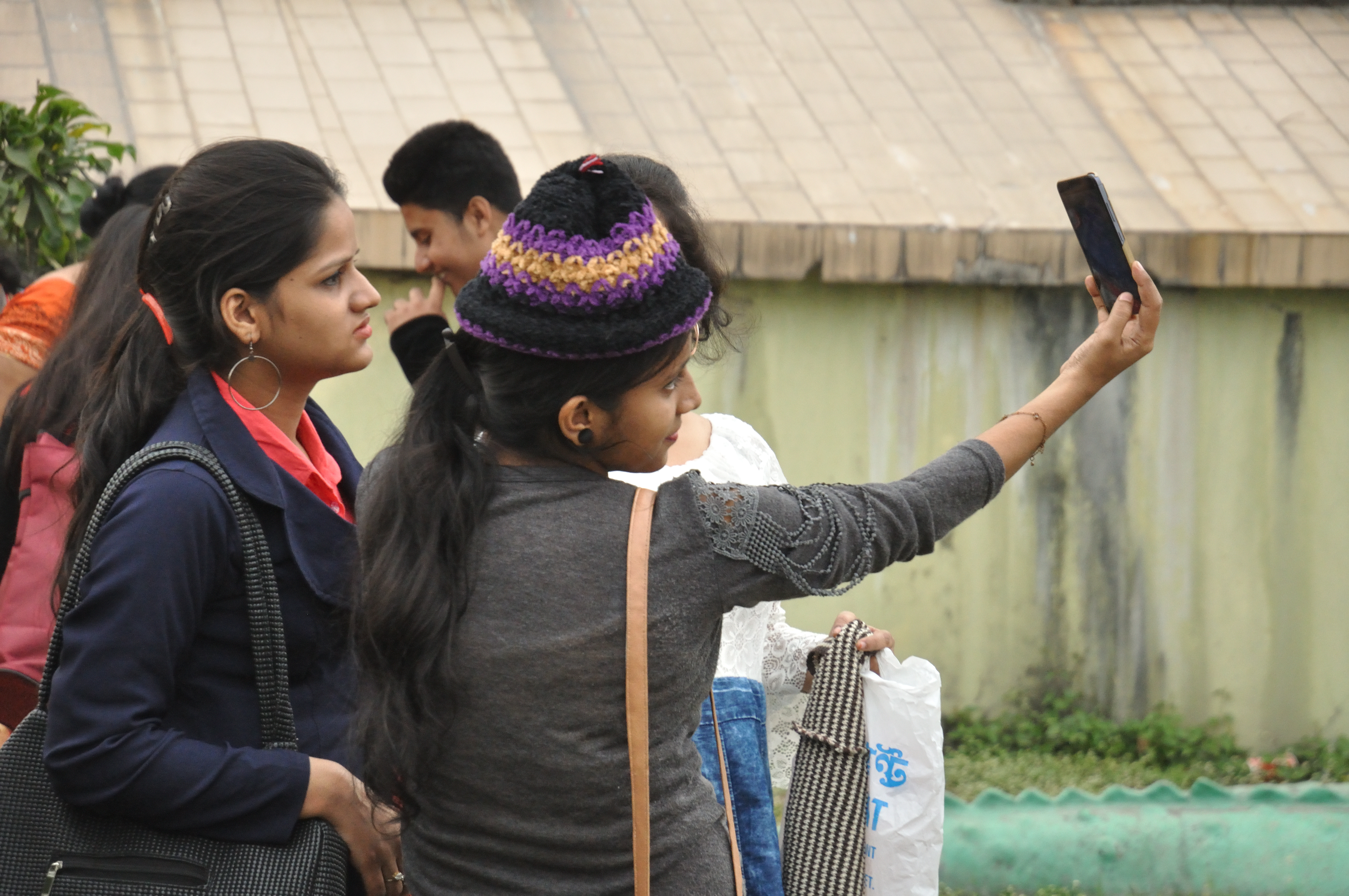
Young people posing with fancy headgear, at Science City Kolkata, 2018

Street style in India is getting on its way by copying this style generally from Hindi cinema. As Indians are always fascinated by fashion, in India, different religions help in achieving this street style.

== Effects of social media ==
=== Fashion bloggers ===
Social media channels have become an efficient way in fashion practices to keep in touch with the consumer base as well as increase it through brand exposure. It allows for immediate feedback from users, which makes it possible to stay up-to-date with the latest changes and trends in street fashion. Blogs that focus on fashion brands and products, street style and personal style in particular are the largest categories of the blogs. Fashion blogs, or style blogs, are blogs that focus on fashion and beauty and are produced by bloggers who self-identify as stylists, creating their own authentic looks and exposing them in urban spaces.

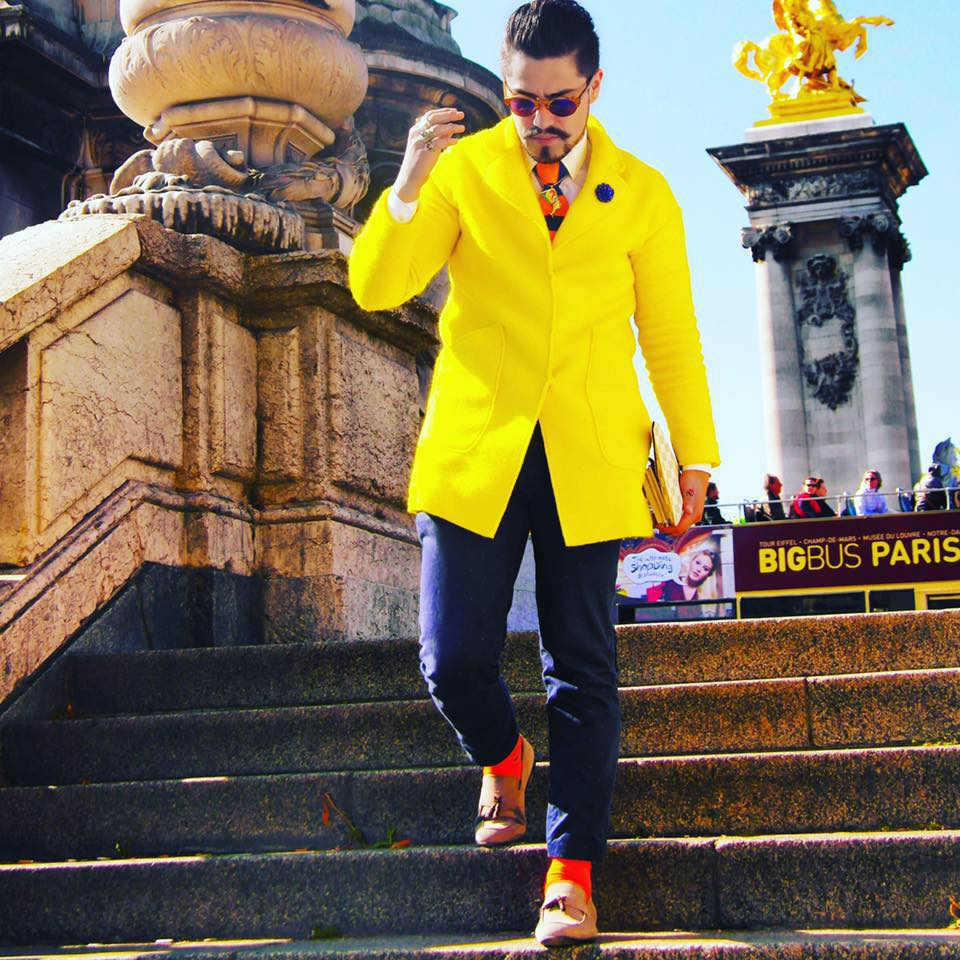
Blogger Alan Cariño attending París Fashion Week

As a result of the widespread growth of fashion blogs, the level of engagement between individuals and fashion industry has risen dramatically, while the gap between fashion houses, publications, and individuals has narrowed. Within the everyday people can communicate via the blogosphere, sharing their personal, individualized expressions of self.

By utilizing texts, including images and narratives, from fashion blogs, individuals can view, and thus, approach dress from an innovative, individualized perspective. Fashion choices are more visible, accessible, and relatable through the fashion blog space due to these sites’ availability, user-friendliness, and constant change (i.e., uploading of new images and narratives). Blogs, in contrast to traditional fashion practices, represent varied images and bodies. However, it has been found that fashion blog imagery is not that different from those bodies featured in fashion editorials: there is often an emphasis on thinness, height, and whiteness. Yet these sites also include images of women that are raced or gendered, which does present an alternative view, as well as male bodies (not common in mainstream fashion editorials for the female subscriber).

=== Instagram ===
Instagram, a leading mobile application for stylizing and sharing photos on the web, has proved popular among street style amateurs and professional street style photographers with large followings.

== Examples ==
Examples from the 1950s, 1970s, 1980s, 1990s, 2000s, and 2010s include:

- Hippies (denim, bohemian style, long hair, flower power and psychedelic imagery, flared trousers)
- Teddy Boys (drape jackets, drainpipe trousers, crepe shoes)
- Punk fashion (ripped clothing, safety pins, bondage, provocative T-shirt slogans, Mohican hairstyle)
- Skinheads (short-cropped hair, fitted jeans, Ben Sherman button-up shirts, Fred Perry polo shirts, Harrington jackets, Dr. Martens boots)
- Gothic fashion (black clothing, heavy coats, poet shirts, big boots, makeup)
- Preppy (argyle sweaters, chinos, madras, Nantucket Reds, button down Oxford cloth shirts, and boat shoes).
  - See also ghetto prep for a 21st-century variant influenced by hip-hop fashion.
- Hip hop fashion and Streetwear (ultra-baggy pants, ECKO, Tribal Gear, South Pole, Avirex, FUBU, Sean Jean, NIKE)
- Hipster or indie (glasses, jeans, beanies, sneakers, ties, suspenders, checked shirts, beards)
- Trendies (androgynous big hair, bright neon colors, skinny jeans, printed hoodies, keffiyehs)
- Rasta (African-inspired clothing, rastacap, dreadlocks)
- Greaser (Levis 501 jeans, T-shirts, leather jackets, sunglasses, Cowboy boots or motorcycle boots, hair gel)
- Urban (colorful apparel, large accent jewelry, skinny jeans, jackets, T-shirts)
- Feminine (dresses, hats, sunglasses, hand bags, floral prints)
- Kawaii (tutu skirts, pastel and pink colors, anime, childish and Gothic Lolita inspired accessories such as wild hair clips or bows)

== See also ==
- Bread & Butter (tradeshow)
- Consumer behaviour
- Counterculture
- Cultural appropriation
- Dress code
- Fashion Design
- Haute Couture
- Streetwear
- Subculture
