= Neo-Victorian =

Aesthetic movement

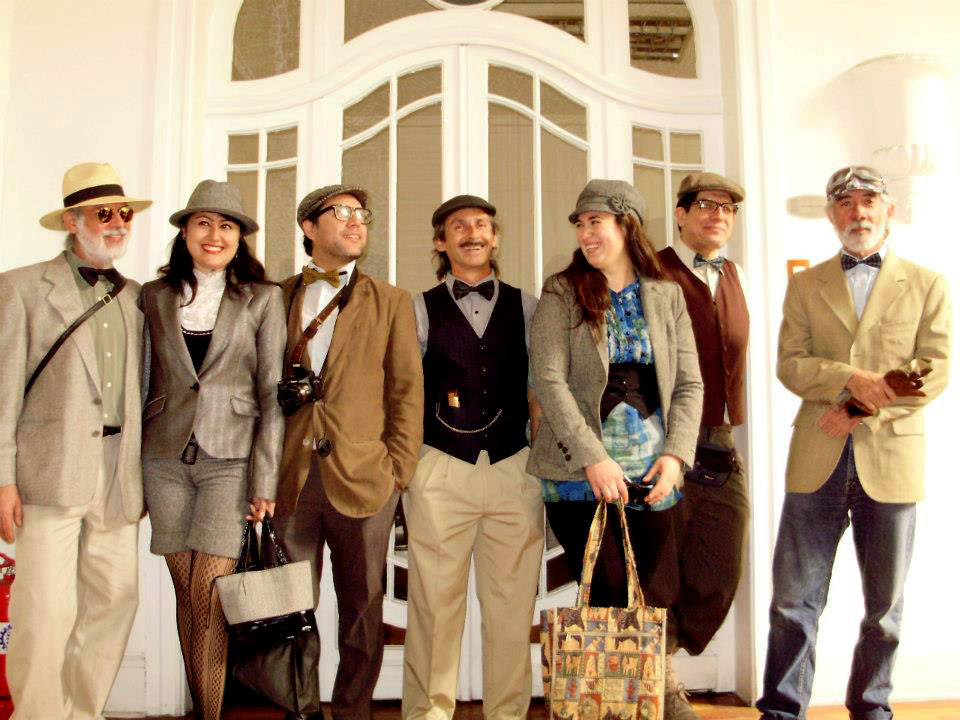
A collection of people dressed in Neo-Victorian clothing

Neo-Victorianism is a contemporary cultural, aesthetic, and literary movement that features overt nostalgia for and revivalism of the Victorian period.

== In arts and crafts ==
Examples of crafts made in this style would include push-button cordless telephones made to look like antique wall-mounted phones, CD players resembling old time radios, Victorianesque furniture, and Victorian era-style clothing.

In neo-romantic and fantasy art, one can often see the elements of Victorian aesthetic values. There is also a strongly emerging genre of steampunk art. McDermott & McGough are a couple of contemporary artists whose work is all about a recreation of life in the nineteenth century: they only use the ultimate technology available, and since they are supposed to live anachronistically, this means the use of earlier photographic processes, and maintaining the illusion of a life stuck in the ways of a forgotten era.

=== Works of fiction ===
Neo-Victorian works of fiction are creative narrative works set in the Victorian period, but written, interpreted or reproduced by more contemporary artists.

Many neo-Victorian novels have reinterpreted, reproduced and rewritten Victorian culture. Significant texts include The French Lieutenant’s Woman (John Fowles, 1969), Possession (A. S. Byatt, 1990), Arthur and George (Julian Barnes, 2005), Dorian, An Imitation (Will Self, 2002) Jack Maggs (Peter Carey, 1997), Wide Sargasso Sea (Jean Rhys, 1966). Recent neo-Victorian novels have often been adapted to the screen, from The French Lieutenant’s Woman (Karel Reisz, 1981) to the television adaptations of Sarah Waters (Tipping the Velvet, BBC2, 2002, Fingersmith, BBC1, 2005, Affinity ITV, 2008) and Michel Faber (The Crimson Petal and the White, BBC 1, 2011). These narratives may indicate a 'sexsation' of neo-Victorianism, and have been called "in-yer-face" neo-Victorianism (Voigts-Virchow).

Recent productions of neo-Victorianism on screen include Guy Ritchie’s Sherlock Holmes films, and TV series such as Sherlock, Ripper Street, Whitechapel, Murdoch Mysteries and Penny Dreadful. The neo-Victorian formula can be expanded to include Edwardian consumer culture (Downton Abbey, The Paradise and Mr Selfridge).

== In dress and behaviour ==
Many who have adopted Neo-Victorian style have also adopted Victorian behavioural affectations, seeking to imitate standards of Victorian conduct, pronunciation, and interpersonal interaction. Some even go so far as to embrace certain Victorian habits such as shaving with straight razors, riding penny-farthings, exchanging calling cards, and using fountain pens to write letters in florid prose sealed by wax. Gothic fashion sometimes incorporates Neo-Victorian style.

Neo-Victorianism is embraced in, but also quite distinguished from, the Lolita, Aristocrat and Madam fashions popular in Japan, and which are becoming more noticeable in Europe.

== Social conservatives ==
Neo-Victorian aesthetics are also popular in the United States and United Kingdom among cultural conservatives and social conservatives. Books such as The Benevolence of Manners: Recapturing the Lost Art of Gracious Victorian Living call for a return to Victorian morality. The term Neo-Victorian is also commonly used in a derogatory way towards social conservatives.

Many of the things that seem commonplace in modern life began in the Victorian era, such as sponsorship, sensational journalism and popular merchandise.

== Research ==
In academia, Neo-Victorianism has become an established area of study, with growing interest across literary and cultural studies. The field is supported by dedicated scholarly platforms, most notably the peer-reviewed journal Neo-Victorian Studies, which publishes interdisciplinary research on the reception, adaptation, and transformation of Victorian culture in modern media.

In September 2007, The University of Exeter explored the phenomenon in a major international conference titled Neo-Victorianism: The Politics and Aesthetics of Appropriation. Academic studies include Neo-Victorianism: The Victorians in the Twenty-First Century, 1999–2009.

Other foundational texts of neo-Victorian criticism are Kucich and Sadoff (2000), Kaplan (2007), Kohlke (2008–), Munford and Young (2009), Mitchell (2010), Davies (2012), Whelehan (2012), Kleinecke-Bates (2014), Böhm-Schnitker and Gruss (2014), Tomaiuolo (2018), and others.

== In popular culture and literature ==
Neo-Victorianism can also be seen in the growing steampunk genre of speculative fiction and in music performers such as Emilie Autumn. Neo-Victorianism is also popular with, and in many ways prefigured by, those who are interested in Victoriana and historical reenactment.

Neo-Victorian details appear in The Diamond Age by Neal Stephenson, in which Neo-Victorians are one of the main groups of protagonists.

Carnival Diablo is a Neo-Victorian circus sideshow that has been touring North America for 20 years.

Unhallowed Metropolis is a roleplaying game based in a Neo-Victorian setting.

== See also ==
- Heritage railway
- Hipster (contemporary subculture)
- Victorian architecture
- Victorian house
- Victorian morality
- Victoriana
