= RinRin Doll =

American model

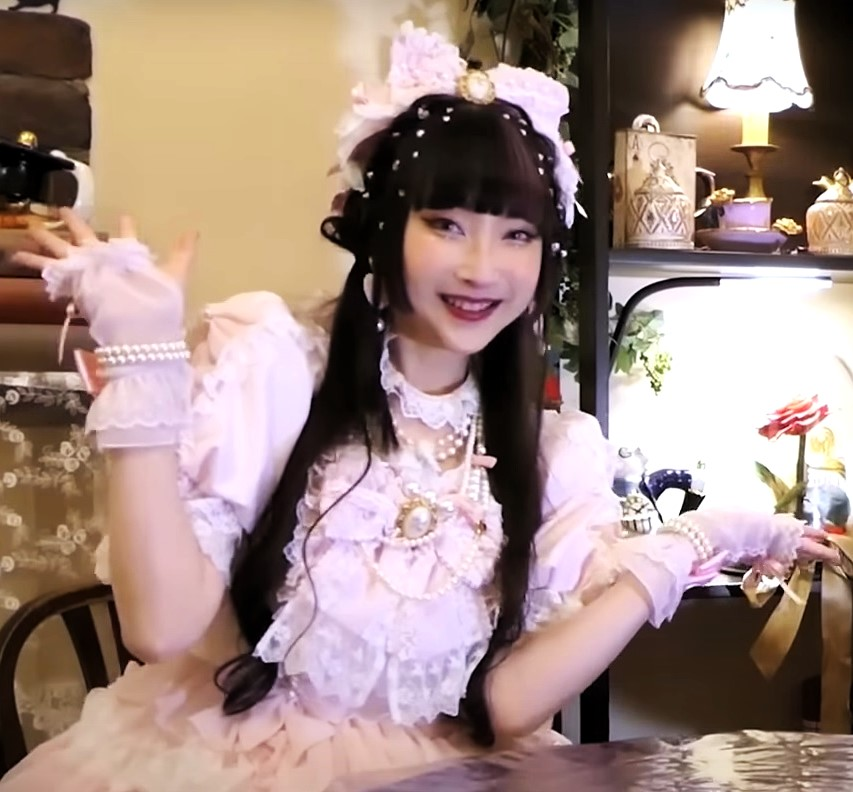
- RinRin Doll on her YouTube channel in 2023
- Born: August 2, 1988 (age 38); Los Angeles, California, United States
- Other name: Lailah
- Education: University of California, Los Angeles
- Occupations: Model; blogger; YouTuber

YouTube information
- Channels: RinRin Doll; RinRin Doll Life in Japan
- Years active: 2009–present
- Genres: Vlog; beauty
- Subscribers: 182 thousand (RinRin Doll); 71.1 thousand (RinRin Doll English Channel)
- Views: 20.6 million (RinRin Doll); 1.08 million (RinRin Doll English Channel)
- Musical career
- Genres: J-pop
- Last updated: April 14, 2026

RinRin Doll (born August 2, 1988) is an American model, blogger, and YouTuber based in Japan. RinRin Doll primarily models for Japanese alternative fashion brands and publications, including Angelic Pretty and Kera. As an influencer, she is also known for sharing beauty trends related to lolita fashion and other parts of the kawaii culture in Japan.

== Career ==
RinRin Doll first became interested in lolita fashion in high school when her friend gifted her a copy of Gothic & Lolita Bible from a trip in Japan. She first modeled for the lolita fashion brand Angelic Pretty for their fashion show at Pacific Media Expo after one of her friends, who was also the organizer for the event, submitted an application for her without her knowledge. RinRin Doll left the United States to study abroad in Japan, where she reconnected with Angelic Pretty. She was recruited to become a model for the brand in 2009. In addition to Angelic Pretty, RinRin Doll also modeled for the brand Alice Age and publications such as Kera and Gothic & Lolita Bible.

In 2011, RinRin Doll appeared as a background extra in an episode of the 2011 live-action television drama adaptation of Deka Wanko. In 2015, RinRin Doll was signed onto Divine for her modeling activities. Throughout her career, she maintained a blog and social media accounts on Facebook, Twitter, and Instagram to document Japanese alternative fashion trends. She later joined YouTube and has been active on that platform since. She signed with Uuum for her YouTube activities. Her appearances in magazines, social media, and conventions led her to become an influencer for lolita and kawaii culture in Japan.

RinRin Doll appeared as a guest for several episodes of NHK Kawaii International before becoming the show's co-host. In 2016, she was partially credited for popularizing the "Momoko make-up" trend.

In 2018, RinRin Doll left Uuum and signed with the talent management company Breaker for her YouTube activities. In April 2020, she went freelance after the COVID-19 pandemic affected her job opportunities. She stated in a 2023 interview that during the pandemic, she worked as a VTuber. Later in the year, RinRin Doll collaborated with Kawaii Monster Cafe to serve a drink based on her image for her birthday.

On June 30, 2023, RinRin Doll collaborated with Bonjour Suzuki to release the song "Carnival Dolls". She co-wrote the lyrics to the song. In September 2023, she made her first runway appearance at Tokyo Fashion Week for the brand Pays des Fées.

== Personal life ==
RinRin Doll is of Taiwanese descent. Before moving to Japan, RinRin Doll lived in Los Angeles, California, and graduated from University of California, Los Angeles. She is fluent in English, Mandarin Chinese, and Japanese. As a child, she learned how to play the piano, attaining a Certificate of Merit for the advanced level, and the guzheng.
