= Anime and manga fandom =

Fan community

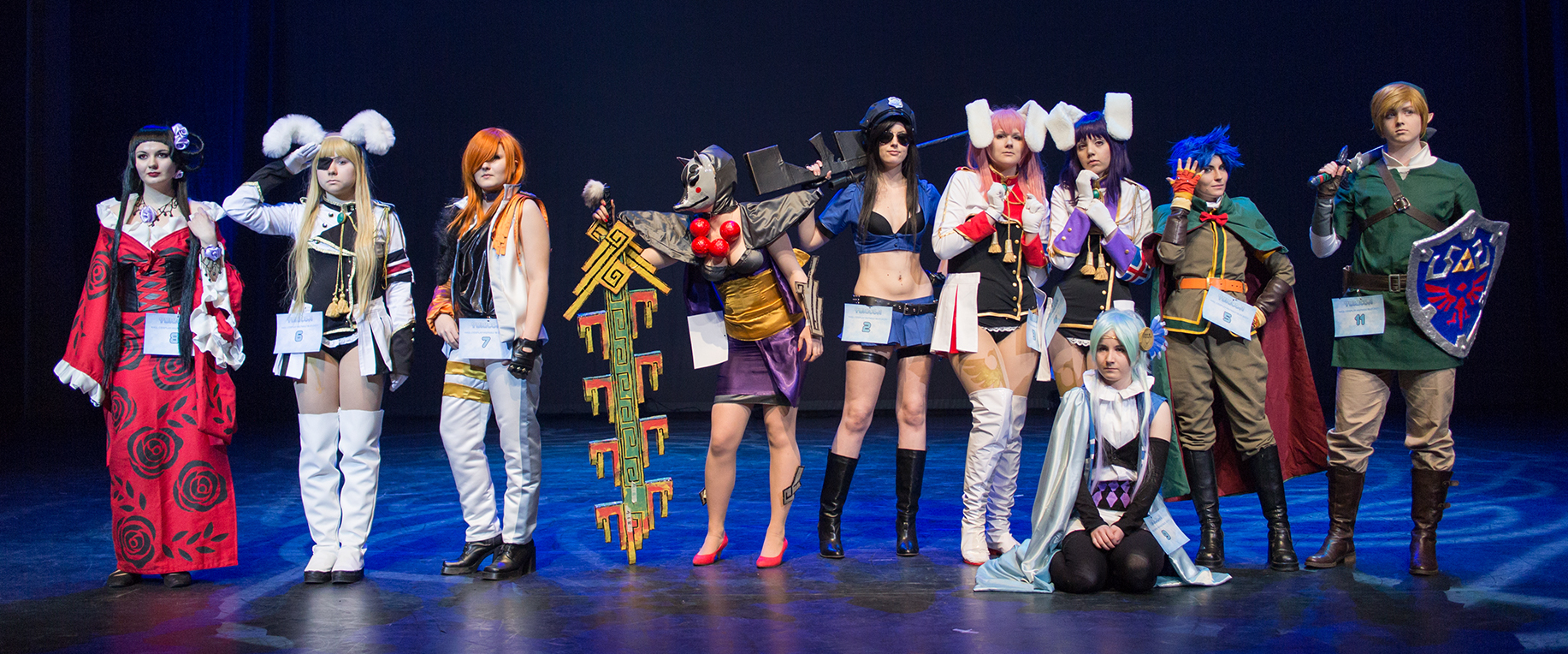
Cosplayers at Yukicon 2014, a fan convention in Finland. Cosplay is a major part of the anime and manga fandom.

The anime and manga fandom is a worldwide community of fans of anime and manga. Anime includes animated series, films and videos, while manga includes manga, graphic novels, drawings, and related artworks. The anime and manga fandom traces back to the 1970s and has an international reach.

== Otaku ==
Otaku is a Japanese term for people with obsessive interests, including anime or manga. In its original context, the term otaku is derived from a Japanese term for another's house or family (お宅, otaku), which is also used as an honorific second-person pronoun. The modern slang form, which is distinguished from the older usage by being written only in hiragana (おたく) or katakana (オタク or ヲタク), or rarely in rōmaji. In the anime Macross, first aired in 1982, the term was used by Lynn Minmay as an honorific term. It appears to have been coined by the humorist and essayist Akio Nakamori in his 1983 series An Investigation of "Otaku" (『おたく』の研究, "Otaku" no Kenkyū), printed in the Lolicon magazine Manga Burikko. Animators like Haruhiko Mikimoto and Shōji Kawamori used the term among themselves as an honorific second-person pronoun since the late 1970s. After its widespread usage by Japanese residents, however, it became pejorative and increasingly offensive in the 1990s, implying that a person is socially inept. Otaku can be seen as being similar to the English terms geek or nerd.

However, the term started to be used by anime and manga fans themselves again starting in the 2000s, in a more general and positive way, and today it is often used by those outside of the fandom to refer to fans of anime or manga. However, older generation otaku, like Otaking (King of Otakus) Toshio Okada, in his book Otaku Wa Sude Ni Shindeiru (オタクはすでに死んでいる) said "the newer generation of self-proclaimed otakus are not real otakus, as they lack the passion and research sense into a particular sub-culture subject and are only common fans which only overspent in buying products."

== History of the community ==
Anime and manga fandoms have always been around, but many claim the first big arrival of a fandom was in the 1970s when fans of the series Space Battleship Yamato banded together to get it back on the air after it stopped airing on Japanese television. In Japan, anime and manga are referred to collectively as the content industry: anime, video games, manga, and other related Merchandising are different types of media focused around the same content.

=== English-language fan communities ===
The fan community in the English-speaking countries started making numbers in the '70s and steadily grew. According to Japanophile Fred Patten, one of the very first fan club devoted to Japanese animation was the Cartoon/Fantasy Organization, which began in Los Angeles in 1977. Its growth was characterized by waves, which Gilles Poitras, Bruce Lewis, and Cathy Sterling describe as distinct 'generations,' often sparked by a singular influential work.

In the Philippines, GMA-7 began airing Voltes V in 1978. It was the first exposure of Filipinos to Japanese animation. Voltes V soon became very popular between children all around the Philippines which led to the sudden popularity of other anime series related to the Super Robot genre in the Philippines. It was soon banned in 1979 by then president Ferdinand Marcos, four episodes before the end of the series, along with the other anime series airing at the time, supposedly for its violence and warlike themes. This, however, did not hinder the Filipinos' growing love of anime, leading to the large popularity of anime and manga throughout the Philippines.

Poitras identifies the first generation as the "Astro Boy Generation". Despite being the first and most popular animated Japanese television series, Astro Boy did not create many hardcore fans, but it exposed viewers to the medium and increased their receptivity towards it later on. The "Early Fans" or "Old Timers" generation that consumed titles like Speed Racer, Eighth Man, and Battle of the Planets as staples. These fans were much more aware that what they were consuming was Japanese and took the initiative to search for more. The "Yamato" or "Star Blazers" generation originating from the series Space Battleship Yamato that originally aired in 1979–80. Poitras states that this generation was so loyal because Star Blazer's strong narration required viewers to never miss an episode. The Poitras dubs the next generation the "Robotech Generation", after the 1985 television series Robotech, is the earliest major generation in the USA and is distinguished by fans clearly recognizing anime as a Japanese product with significant differences from American animation. Fans from this generation and the Yamato Generation were to make up the significant portion of organized fandom throughout the 1980s. The film Akira, which played in art theaters in December 1989, produced a cult following that Poitras names the "Akira Generation". Akira inspired some to move on to other works but stalled many becoming an isolated work in their eyes, overshadowing the creative context of anime and manga it represented.

Then in the 1990s, Poitras states that "something new happened in the U.S.", the "Sailor Moon Generation" was born. Previous generations consisted mostly of college age fans, however in 1995 Sailor Moon was adapted into English and caught the attention of people even as young as grade school in age, many of them female. In the span of a few months, the fan demographic changed dramatically and as their interests diversified, so did the titles adapted into English. Poitras, Lewis and Sterling describe current generation of fans as the "Otaku Generation", however not necessarily applying the word otaku to current fans. For this generation, the release of a title onto the television in the past was unusual enough that fans often remember their first anime experience as something special. Poitras remarked that as of the "Otaku Generation", the influx of fans into the fandom is better characterized by a continuous stream than as waves as it was in the past.

In the United States, the fan community began as an offshoot of science fiction fan community, with fans bringing imported copies of Japanese manga to conventions. Before anime began to be licensed in the U.S., fans who wanted to get a hold of anime would leak copies of anime movies and subtitle them, thus marking the start of fansubs. By 1994, anime had become more common in the U.S., and had begun being translated into English and shown on television, most commonly shōnen series such as Pokémon and Astro Boy.

Marathon viewing sessions of Japanese anime television series have been a common trend in anime fandom for decades, dating back to the late 1970s to 1980s. According to an early American anime cosplayer Karen Schnaubelt, Japanese anime were "incredibly difficult to come by" with "nothing available except broadcast TV until" VHS videotapes became commonly available in the late 1970s, allowing fans to import anime shows from Japan; she noted that a friend "would record the episodes" and then "a group of us would gather at his apartment and watch a marathon of the episodes". At comic conventions and sci-fi conventions in the 1980s, fans brought video tapes to hold marathon anime screenings; BayCon 1986, for example, held an 80-hour long anime marathon.

According to Mike Tatsugawa, the founder and CEO of the Society for the Promotion of Japanese Animation, the first milestone for anime in the U.S. was in the 1980s with the advent of the Internet. With the Internet, fans were able to more easily communicate with each other and thus better able to exchange fan-subtitled tapes and higher quality versions of anime. Some experts, such as Susan Napier, a Professor of Japanese Language and Literature, say that Akira marked the first milestone. However, most experts agree that the next milestone was in 1992 when U.S. Renditions, a film importer, released the first English-subtitled anime videotape that year, entitled Gunbuster. According to Tatsugawa, the success of Gunbuster triggered a flurry of releases. According to Lawrence Eng, around that time, Gunbuster was the first anime that could have caused anime and manga fandom, specifically the otaku subculture, to grow, as the protagonist, Noriko Takaya, is shown to be an otaku.

Due to the localization process, many people who grew up watching anime did so not realizing that it originated in Japan. After the success of Power Rangers (which first aired in 1993), U.S. television companies began broadcasting Sailor Moon and Dragon Ball Z in 1995 and 1996 respectively. However, due to the relative failure of the latter two (both shows brought success when aired at a later time on Cartoon Network), anime did not seem like it would become mainstream. However, the anime boom in the U.S. began with the airing of the anime series Pokémon in syndication in 1998, which served as proof to U.S. broadcasters and distributors that Japanese media could succeed in the U.S. market. It was only after Pokémon and Power Rangers left the mainstream that U.S. audiences became aware of anime's Japanese origins.

==== Anime streaming outlets in the United States ====
In the United States there are multiple streaming outlets that fans can use to view anime and manga, while also being able to connect with those communities. One such outlet is Crunchyroll, a streaming service that lets users view popular anime from the past and new anime episodes released to the website. Crunchyroll was created in 2006 as a distribution outlet for anime. Crunchyroll has since evolved into becoming something more for fans in the anime community. They have added an addition to their website that allows anime and manga fans to get news about anime releases, events, and topics related to the community. This has also evolved to the creation of the Crunchyroll Expo. This exposition is a large-scale event in San Jose, CA, that allows anime and manga fans to connect. The streaming service also features a store where you can purchase anime related products such as figures, Japanese snacks, apparel, posters, video games and manga.

In addition, another streaming service within the United States is FUNimation. Similar to Crunchyroll, FUNimation allows fans to view newly released anime while also offering a store with products similar to Crunchyroll. FUNimation's website also has a section created for events related to anime and manga that allows their members to connect at the local and national level. There is also a blog section that allows those with an account on FUNimation to connect with other fans and talk about their favorite, or maybe even least favorite, anime and episode.

Mass streaming services like Netflix and Prime Video have also expanded into licensing and distributing anime since the early-2010s.

=== European fan communities ===
In the 1970s, Japanese Animation reached Western Europe mainly with productions aimed at European and Japanese children with the main results being Heidi, Vicky the Viking and Barbapapa. However, these works were not recognized as Japanese productions and did not earn much of a dedicated fanbase. Italy, Spain and France, however, grew an interest for more Japanese animation for their television programming, due to success of previous co-productions, Japan's productive output and cheap selling price in comparison to US animation. Particularly Italy imported the most anime outside of Japan. Like in the Philippines, the Super Robot Genre became very popular with series such as UFO Robot Grendizer and Mazinger Z. However, many more genres got added to the mix, with space opera such as Captain Harlock, shojo shows like Candy Candy and Rose of Versailles, sports like Captain Tsubasa and more. Germany however largely rejected Anime other than western literature adaptations of Nippon Animation, with Speed Racer and Captain Future proving to be problematic. It was only during the rise of cable television during the '90s that Japanese series such as Queen Millennia, and Rose of Versailles went on air. A strong affinity for unique Japanese productions was developed among a generation of German children during this period.

In Central and Eastern Europe, the Polish fandom was one of the first and largest fandoms to develop. The beginning of the anime and manga fandom in Poland can be traced to the 1990s, a few years after the fall of communism in Eastern Europe.

=== Asian fan communities ===
==== Malaysia ====
Studies of fan behavior focused more on big fan activities or conventions in the past and transitioned toward from fan communities to individual fans. There are four conventions in urban areas of Malaysia: Kota Kinabalu, Sabah; Kuching, Sarawak; Sunway, Petaling Jaya, Selangor and Kuala Lumpur. They are held four times annually between December 2012 and August 2013. According to the survey, there are about 585 people who regularly attend these conventions. Half of the respondents were aged 18–22 as of 2013 with equal numbers of both genders. More than half of the respondents were student and all respondents were consumers of Japanese media. Although those four conventions did not officially announce that their event is mainly Japanese popular culture, majority of people were fans of Japanese popular culture. Their main purpose in attending these conventions is to meet new and old friends, to have fun, and to cosplay. They regularly attend these conventions to keep their fan communities active.

=== China ===
China's largest doujin (fan-created) event brand is Comicup (CP). The October 2025 Shanghai edition, Comicup ShanghaiPlus, reported more than 200,000 attendees across two days, an exhibition area of 230,000 square metres, and over 8,000 creator booths. The 31st Comicup (CP31), held in Hangzhou in May 2025, attracted over 160,000 visitors, utilised 150,000 square metres of exhibition space, and hosted more than 12,000 booths; according to venue operator Hangzhou Convention and Exhibition Center, 94.3% of attendees travelled from outside the city.

Beyond doujin events, China hosts large-scale ACGN conventions with mainstream corporate backing. Bilibili World (BW), held annually in Shanghai since 2017, drew approximately 400,000 visits over three days in July 2025, with 167 exhibitors, more than 30,000 cosplayers, and attendees from over 20 countries and regions; 13% of ticket buyers used passports, the highest proportion in the event's history. According to Nikkei Asia, China's market for 2D character fandom has doubled in five years to an estimated US$83 billion and spans roughly 500 million people, driven by both imported Japanese intellectual property and domestic creations.

Domestic animation production has grown alongside this fandom. At its 2025 国创 (domestic animation) conference, Bilibili announced 40 domestic titles for 2025–2026, including continuing series such as Fanren Xiu Xian Zhuan and Mu Shen Ji, which had accumulated over 1.1 billion views and more than 5.3 million followers on the platform. The platform reported that it had launched over 3,000 domestic animation works since 2018.

=== India ===
Anime fandom in India has expanded rapidly in the 2020s. The third Anime India convention, held in Delhi in June 2026, reported a total footfall of approximately 42,000–43,000 attendees over two days. This offline growth follows a much larger viewing base: Ampere Analysis data reported by Variety found that 42% of Indian internet users identify as anime viewers, compared with 59% in the Philippines, 50% in Indonesia, and 43% in Singapore.

=== Latin American fan communities ===
==== Mexico ====
Japanese television shows began to be distributed in Latin America in the 1970s which included anime and was marketed as children's television. In the decades following, Japanese population culture saw a rise in popularity in Mexico. This popularity created fandom spaces around anime and Mexican fans that refer to themselves as otaku. Within these fandom spaces, the character Son Goku from the Dragon Ball series has become a highly popular figure in the country. His importance stems from both his character and his story, which resonates with fans of the anime despite Goku not being Mexican himself. A few fan-created works that implement Goku include a taqueria based in Oaxaca, Mexico in his name (aptly named 'Tacos Goku'), a web-series titled Dr. Goku (created by Rulo Barrera), and the countless amounts of fan art that tie Goku with Mexican culture. Many Mexican otaku's fan-made works have influence and/or are heavily inspired by the anime style.

== Demographics ==
=== Age ===
In a Japanese nationwide survey held in 2018 by Dentsu, 64.3% of Japanese individuals among the 20-29 age group responded that they are highly interested in anime, while the corresponding figure for those aged 15–19 was 72.4%, 56% aged 30–39, 48.4% aged 40–49, 38.7% aged 50–59. A Dentsu nationwide U.S. survey conducted in July 2022 targeting Americans aged 18–54, showed that about 1 (approximately 56 million people) in 3 American respondents in the age group watch viral anime titles. When narrowed down to American respondents aged between 18 and 24, 44% (approximately 19 million people) stated that they watch viral anime titles. Additionally, 47% of the 18-24 year old respondents stated that they had friends with whom they discussed anime and 42.3% had read the original manga series on which the anime titles were based on. Researchers noted that since the popularization of video streaming services, the sales of manga have also greatly increased in the US and other countries with Gen Z effecting this trend the most. According to the survey 34% of United States Gen Z (around 15 million people), acknowledge themselves as anime otaku.

A 2022 survey held by Morning Consult showed that 42% of anime fans in the United States are Millennials, 25% are adult Gen-Zs, 21% are Gen Xers and 12% are Baby Boomers.

An August 2023 survey published in 2024 by Polygon showed that 3% of Boomers, 12% of Gen Xers, 25% of Millennials and 42% of Gen Zs in the United states watch anime weekly.

The 2025 Dentsu Global Research Report across the U.S., EMEA, and APAC showed that globally 50% of Gen-Zs and 48% of Millennials watch anime at least weekly.

According to a global study commissioned by Crunchyroll and conducted by National Research Group (NRG), which surveyed 29,000 entertainment consumers aged 13–54 across seven markets (United States, United Kingdom, India, Germany, France, Brazil and Mexico), approximately 47% of Gen Z respondents (ages 13–28) said they “like” or “love” anime and watch it at least monthly, compared to 33% of Millennials (ages 29–44) and 24% of Gen X (ages 45–54). The research further shows that a notable portion of older fans exhibit long-term engagement: over half of Millennial anime fans and 54% of Gen X fans reported having watched anime for more than a decade.

=== Gender ===
In the early days of the fandom, it was predominantly male.

An analytical survey held by Forbes in 2014 revealed that half of North American anime convention attendees are female.

2022 survey data from the Morning Consult showed that the anime fandom is 61% male and 39% female.

The 2025 Dentsu Global Research Report showed that of the globally surveyed consumer population 37% of men and 29% of women watch anime at least weekly.

=== Ethnicity ===
According to Morning Consult's 2022 survey, 47% of American anime fans are White, 28% are Hispanic, 18% are Black and 7% are Asian.

=== Sexual orientation ===
2024 survey data from Polygon revealed that 27% of American anime fans identify as LGBTQ+ with the remaining 73% as heterosexual. When narrowed down to Gen Z fans the share changed to 57% heterosexual and 39% LGBTQ+.

=== Streaming service usage ===
2024 survey data from Polygon showed that American Gen Z and Millennial anime fans primarily watch anime on Netflix (76%), Hulu (55%), Amazon Prime Video (47%), Crunchyroll (45%) and Max (25%). When looking specifically at Gen Z anime fan viewing habits, Crunchyroll (58%) came in second overall behind Netflix (76%), followed by Hulu (55%), Prime Video (35%), and Funimation (32%).

The 2025 Dentsu’s global survey across the U.S., EMEA, and APAC found that the most common platform for watching anime globally is Netflix (48%), followed by Disney+ (32%) and Prime Video (29%). In the U.S., Netflix held an even stronger lead: 63% of anime viewers watched on Netflix, while Hulu and Disney+ were both at 46%, and Prime Video at 43%. In the APAC region, Netflix still led with 36%, while other platforms like YouTube TV (26%) and iQiyi (25%) also played significant roles. In the EMEA region Netflix is also the leading platform with 53%, followed by Prime Video (39%) and Disney+ (32%).

In Southeast and South Asia, free ad-supported YouTube distribution plays a substantially larger role than in Western markets. Several licensor-run channels operate in this space: Muse Asia, launched in 2019; Ani-One Asia, owned by Hong Kong's Medialink Group; and Tropics Anime Asia, established in 2023 under Taiwan's NADA Group. Muse Asia's distribution listings name Taiwan, Singapore, Malaysia, Thailand, Vietnam, Indonesia, India, the Philippines, Myanmar, Bangladesh, Bhutan, Brunei, Cambodia, Laos, Nepal, and Pakistan as coverage territories. Ani-One Asia's regional licensing announcements list Nepal, Pakistan, Bangladesh, Bhutan, Sri Lanka, and the Maldives alongside Southeast Asian territories for titles such as Reincarnated as a Sword season 2. Tropics Anime Asia streamed Death Note free in Bangladesh, Bhutan, Brunei, Cambodia, India, Indonesia, Laos, Malaysia, Myanmar, Nepal, the Philippines, Singapore, Thailand, and Vietnam.

The GEM Partners Anime Global White Paper 2026, surveying 15,000 respondents across 15 countries, found that YouTube placed in the top three anime platforms in eight of nine major markets and ranked first in Japan; Crunchyroll reached the top three only in Brazil. In India, the top three platforms in 2025 were Netflix, Prime Video, and YouTube, with Crunchyroll absent from the top three; IGN India attributed YouTube's position to free legal channels including Ani-One Asia and Muse Asia, "along with newer similar channels popping up." A Media Partners Asia report covered by Variety found that 70 million people in Japan alone watch anime-related content on YouTube monthly, totalling 2.8 billion hours, and that official channels such as Aniplex and Toho animation now function as media businesses in their own right.

=== Dubbing and subbing ===
Recent industry reports indicate a gradual shift in global preferences between dubbed and subtitled anime. According to Netflix, a substantial majority of its international anime audience—estimated at 80–90 percent—now watches anime with dubbed audio, reflecting the medium’s increasing accessibility and expansion to more casual viewers worldwide. Similarly, commentary on Crunchyroll’s audience data suggests that dubbed versions have gained ground in several markets, including the United Kingdom, where dubs can be slightly more popular than subtitled formats. This marks a notable change from earlier fan culture, in which subtitles were often favored for maintaining original vocal performances and perceived authenticity. However, preferences continue to vary by region, age group, and viewing context, with many long-time and dedicated fans still expressing a strong preference for subtitled anime.

== Appeal of anime and manga ==
One major appeal of anime is its artwork; some fans claim that its visual quality is superior to that found in most animated series made in the United States and some ignore all non-Japanese animation. One fan described enjoying anime because "there is no dividing line between special effects and what is real...it's just the way somebody imagined it". The content editor of Anime Fringe, Holly Kolodziejczak, described being amazed by anime's depth that was unlike the cartoons she had seen before: "the characters had real personalities, their own feelings and motivations for their actions, strengths and flaws that enhanced their characters. They were more like real people, and thus people could much more readily identify with them." Larry Green of Nausicaa.net agreed and added that anime discusses subjects for both adults and children whereas in the United States animation is traditionally for children. He also stated that any viewer would be able to find something to their liking due to anime's large scale of production.

Susan J. Napier, a professor of Japanese Language and Literature, stated that anime fans "find refuge in a culture that diverges from the typical American way of life." She pointed out that fascination with Japanese culture is not a new concept and has existed since the mid-19th century. For example, an 1876 painting by Claude Monet entitled La Japonaise depicts Monet's wife wearing a kimono, with Japanese hand fans shown in the background. Napier described this interest in Japan as an "escape from the Industrial Revolution ... a pastoral utopia" for many Europeans.

According to Polygons 2024 survey 44% of anime viewers have developed a crush on an anime character. Almost two-thirds of the anime-watching Gen Z audience said they emotionally connect better with anime than they do with traditional media. 65% of the surveyed anime fans said that they find anime more emotionally compelling than other forms of media. Over 50% of surveyed Gen-Z anime fans said that anime influences their identity, fashion and social understanding.

And A key characteristic of many anime television shows is serialization, where a continuous story arc stretches over multiple episodes or seasons. Traditional American television had an episodic format, with each episode typically consisting of a self-contained story. So it brings excitement to the viewers.

=== Fan service ===
Fan service is material in a series which is intentionally added to please the audience. Although fan service usually refers to sexually provocative scenes, it also refers more generally to events of little plot value designed to excite viewers or simply make them take notice, such as big explosions and battle scenes. When anime and manga are translated into English by U.S. companies, the original work is often edited to remove some of the fan service to make it more appropriate for U.S. audiences. Mike Tatsugawa explained this change as a result of a difference between cultural values of Japan and the U.S. In fact, some anime seem to feature little else other than fan service as their selling point. Some believe that the prevalence of fan service indicates a lack of maturity within the fandom; an editor of Del Rey Manga joked that manga Negima!, which contained fan service, should be rated as "for immature readers 16+" rather than for "mature readers 16+".

== Fan labor ==
=== Doujin ===
Doujin are fan-made creations that are oftentimes bought and sold through doujin events. Doujin consists of doujinshi (doujin magazine, could be manga, novel, or essay), doujinsoft (doujin games and software), doujin music, and doujin anime. Doujin events aim to help creators distribute manga commercially without the need for a publisher. The oldest and largest doujin event worldwide is Comic Market, more commonly known as Comiket. The Comiket 97 fair (December 2019) in Tokyo, Japan totaled approximately 750,000 visitors.

== Learning about Japan ==
=== Language ===
Anime and manga have stimulated many young people to learn the Japanese language. In the 1970s, Naoka Takaya's Saskatoon Japanese Language School was founded with a student body consisting of primarily Japanese-Canadians interested in polishing their language skills for their return to Japan. However, popularity for the language began to rise; the Japanese Language Proficiency Test was first held in 1984 in response to growing demand for standardized Japanese language certification. Yuki Sasaki, who works for the Japanese language program at the University of Georgia, noted that when she first started in the program in 1994, most students were interested in Japanese for internal business majors; however, in 2004, students are more interested in "translating Japanese pop-song lyrics and talk excitedly about the Japanese anime character Sakura Kinomoto from Cardcaptor Sakura." Echoing this sentiment, Takaya also stated that about 60% of her students are studying Japanese because of anime.

Despite some fansubbers declaring (due to fansubbing's illegality) that they will stop distribution once a series is licensed, many fansubbed versions of anime are produced because of the stiff localization process in official translations. According to one survey only 9% of fans prefer dubbing over subs; some fans believe that the localization process degrades the quality of anime and thus look to fansubs for the purer form of Japanese culture, feeling that something is lost in translation. Most hardcore fans are motivated by the desire not to miss the jokes and puns present in Japanese anime and manga. In fact, most people interested in anime express at least a passing desire to learn Japanese, but usually choose not to, due to either time constraints or rumours about the difficulty involved in learning Japanese. Japanese terms are so well integrated into the anime and manga fan culture that during a Fanime convention, a newcomer expressed confusion at some of the announcements because she was unable to understand the Japanese words used. As fans become more proficient at Japanese; they often also become more critical toward the quality of various translations; some critique the different translations of a single series by different fansub groups.

Some fans even decide to translate professionally. In fact, fluent English speakers who know sufficient Japanese are often preferred for translating over fluent Japanese speakers who know sufficient English, as the syntax of the latter group tends to be stiff. Del Rey Manga's editor finds much of their talent through conventions.

- Japanese language in Australia

Research about Japanese language in Northwood and Thomson 2012, The Japan Foundation 2011 and 2013 tells us that many people are motivated to learn the Japanese language due to interest in Japanese popular culture. People who are not formally studying Japanese but identify themselves as Japanese popular culture are ignored. However, the report in East Asian Journal of Popular Culture by Sumiko lida and William S. Armour suggest the opposite. Their 2016 study results show that people's interest and motivation to consume Japanese popular culture products does not lead them to get formal Japanese language education. Their goal was to discover the correlation of Australian fans of anime and manga with the Japanese popular culture products. The results were 47.7 (n=118) percent of the people who had some sort of Japanese education indicated that they got the motivation to learn through anime and manga. But 66.3 (132 out of 199) percent of people who said they had no prior education in Japanese also showed motivation to learn Japanese in the future. While there are still optimism about Japanese popular culture fans' would increase the number of people who wants to learn Japanese language, the actual data seems to contradict.

- Manga and anime in the Secondary English classroom

Teaching anime text in an English classroom setting is something to be experimented to see how it shapes the relationship between teachers and students. Manga and anime texts are new in Western education. Australian state of New South Wales implemented manga and anime texts in their secondary English class and the results were different depending on how much students are interested in manga and anime. Students who were interested in manga and anime and called themselves 'big fans" showed very very high level of enthusiasm in class. Students showed significant and emotive level of engagement in class. Students were able to share their thoughts in manga and anime texts in their English classroom. Difference arose when a student was not interested in manga and anime texts. Frank in the experiment argued that it did not capture the majority of students to be interest in manga and anime texts. Having few students who are interested in manga and anime out of 30 students which is the average class sizes is not a majority. This results shows that implementing manga and anime texts would be different depending on the student.

=== Culture ===
Anime and manga have also inspired many young people to learn about Japanese culture, and the anime fan community in fact encourages people to do so. Fans often learn about Japanese honorifics from anime and manga. Companies such as Del Rey Manga and GoComi add explanatory notes describing honorifics and other words and concepts that do not translate well between languages.

== Technology and the Internet ==
Developments on the Internet have had profound effects on the anime fan community and the way in which anime is consumed. Additionally, fan interest in anime has inspired many developments in technology. Roughly 68% of fans obtain anime through downloading from the Internet or through their friends, a much larger proportion than in any other medium. As a result, anime fans have made some of the most sophisticated advances in peer-to-peer software in order to make searching for and downloading anime online faster. Other fans have created websites that uses a custom server to search the Internet for video mirrors and new episodes, similar to search engines on how they crawl each website and saves the information gathered to the database. The search engine keeps every episodes up to date. VirtualDub, a video capture and processing utility, was first created for use on an anime film adaptation of Sailor Moon. The desire to simulate all forms of media that anime and manga comes in has caused PyTom to create Ren'Py, an open-source software engine that allows for the creation of visual novels without the need for a programming background. Anime fans have also developed image upscaling tools, some using Artificial intelligence. Examples of such tools are waifu2x, Bigjpg and Anime4K. The Combined Community Codec Pack (CCCP, a play on the initials of the former Soviet Union) was originally created for the playback of anime fansubs.

Fansub practices have rapidly declined since the early-2010s due to the advent of legal streaming services such as Netflix, Prime Video, Hulu, Hidive and Crunchyroll, which simulcast new anime series often within a few hours of their domestic release.

Several online communities have been formed where fans can come together to share and interact. Sites that offer file sharing services are popular and influential where people can gain easy access to anime and manga. Fandom has also resulted in the creation of anime and manga fan communities on sites where people can share fan art, one of the most common ways for fans to express their love of anime. These communities tend to do more than just share files. Like most forums on the Internet, they discuss topics that they are interested in and want to know more about. These anime forums are becoming places for people to discuss the plot, characters, and styles of anime and manga. Since the 2010s, many anime fans have begun widely using social media platforms like YouTube, Facebook, Reddit and Twitter to discuss and follow the latest news of their favorite anime and manga series.

In Japan, anime discussion forums were popular in the 2000s and, in 2009, fans of the anime adaptation of Haruhi Suzumiya popularized them with the Japanese-speaking side of the internet-using part of that community.

== Sightseeing in Japan ==
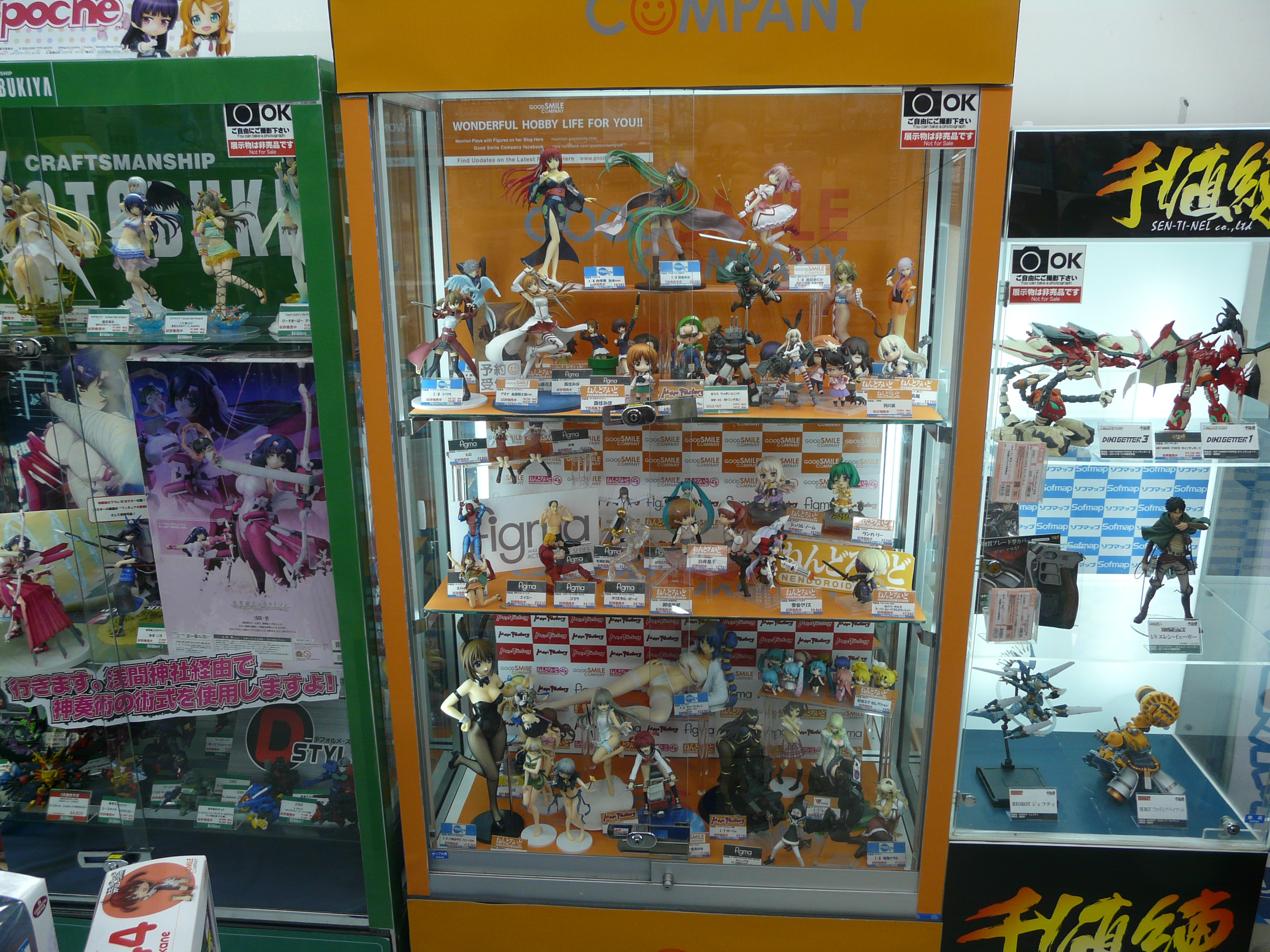
Display cases featuring typical Japanese anime and manga figurines in Akihabara

A number of travel agencies from Japan have begun offering anime tours. In 2003, the company Pop Japan Travel was founded to help customers experience Japan's content industry (including anime, games, food, and fashion) by allowing them to visit studios and meet artists, among other activities. Many different museums dedicated to the industry exist throughout Japan, such as the Suginami Animation Museum in Tokyo and the Tezuka Osamu Manga Museum in the Hyogo Prefecture.

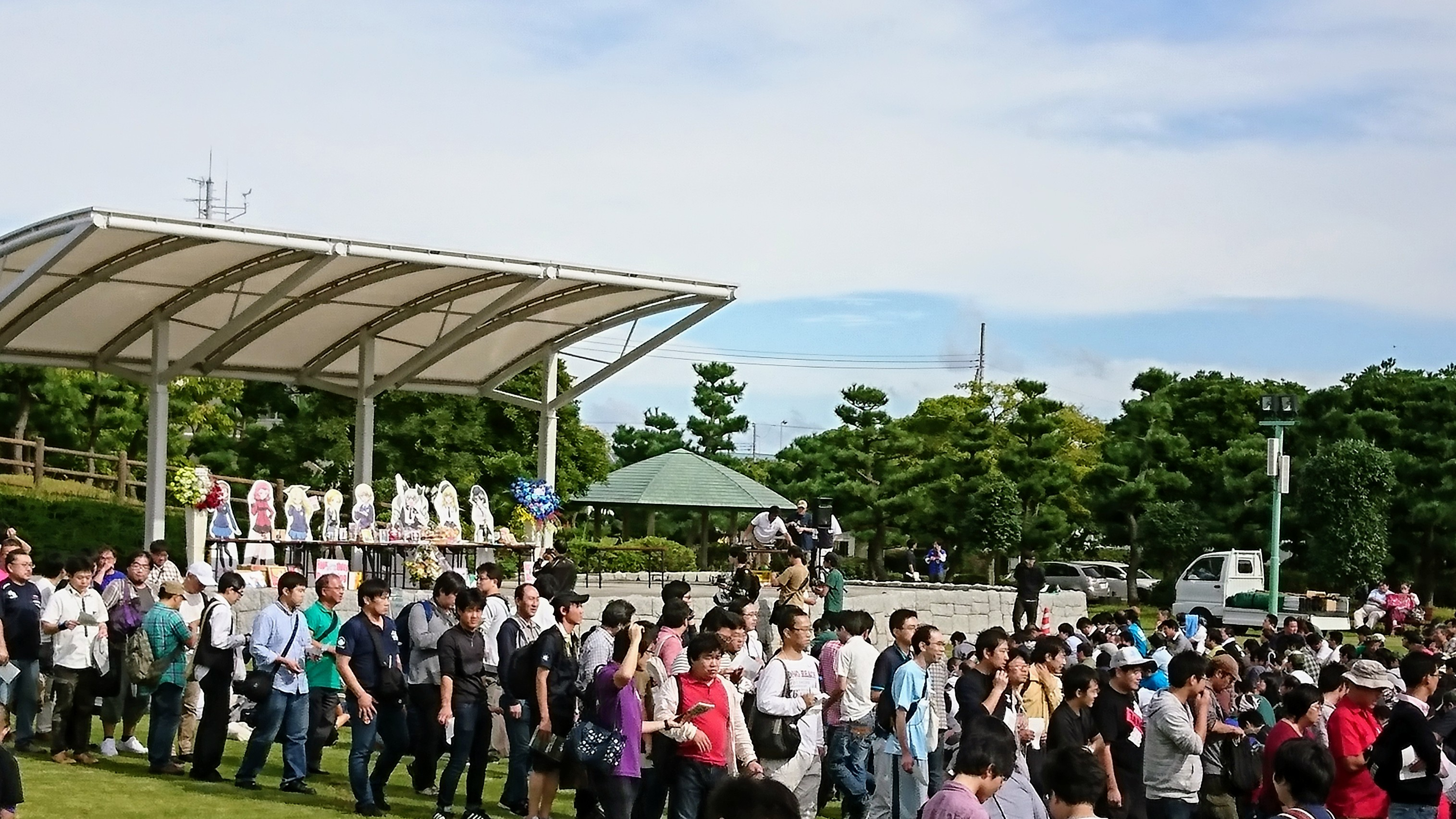
Visiting places where anime is set is called a Seichi junrei and Ōarai Town is famous as the sacred place of Girls und Panzer.

Other popular locations include spaces offering anime-related activities, such as shopping for related merchandise or singing anime theme songs. Additionally, fans can visit real-life locations seen in anime, and locations where live-action movies were filmed. For example, the popularity of Lucky Star brought many of its fans to the real-life settings of the anime, beginning in April 2007.

Places to visit for anime and manga fans

- Akihabara: A popular shopping area located in Tokyo. Known as the Electric Town, it is a major shopping hub where people can buy manga, anime, and other assorted otaku merchandise. The Tokyo Anime Center is one of the most popular spots in Akihabara, where a diverse set of events take place, such as the display of new anime films, related exhibitions, talk shows featuring voice actors, and public recordings of radio programs.
- The Gundam Base Tokyo: A store themed after the Gundam franchise. It opened on August 19, 2017, replacing Gundam Front Tokyo at Diver City Tokyo Plaza in Odaiba. There is Life-Sized Unicorn Gundam Statue(RX-0) which transforms every hour from Unicorn Mode to Destroy Mode.
- Ghibli Museum: A museum showcasing the work of the Japanese animation studio Studio Ghibli. Located in Inokashira Park in Mitaka, it combines features of a children's museum, technology museum, and a fine arts museum. In addition to that, it includes replica of the Catbus from My Neighbor Totoro (1988), a café, bookstore, rooftop garden, and a theater for exclusive short films produced by Studio Ghibli.
- Kyoto International Manga Museum: Located in Kyoto, Japan, the museum includes approximately 250,000 pieces in its collection which includes Edo period prints, pre-war magazines, classic post-war manga, and popular modern series. The museum regularly hosts events throughout the week that includes letting visitors watch manga artists work, pay for a consultation on their own drawing skills, and have their portrait drawn.
- Otome Road: A major shopping and cultural center for anime and manga aimed at women and girls in Tokyo. Companies hold cosplay events around the area and retailers stock manga and anime that has a heavy focus on the Shojo and Yaoi genres.
- Universal Studios Japan: Universal Studios Japan holds events as collaborations with the companies behind popular anime series like Attack on Titan, as part of the Cool Japan anime campaign.

== Indian anime ==
The term Indian anime is often used informally to describe animated works produced in India that are influenced by the visual style and storytelling techniques of Japanese anime. Although India has had an animation industry for several decades, the visible influence of anime began to grow after Japanese animated series became popular among Indian audiences in the late 1990s and early 2000s.

India’s animation industry originally focused on advertising films, mythological television series, and children’s programming. However, a major shift occurred when Japanese shows such as Dragon Ball Z, Naruto, and Pokémon began airing on Indian television. These series introduced viewers to a different animation style—characterized by expressive faces, dramatic action scenes, and long-form storytelling. As Internet access and streaming platforms expanded in the 2010s, Indian viewers gained greater exposure to anime. This exposure influenced a new generation of artists and animators who began experimenting with similar visual techniques in their own productions.

=== Style and Features ===
Indian anime-inspired works usually blend Japanese-style character design with Indian cultural themes. Common features include:

- Sharp, expressive facial designs
- Fast-paced action sequences
- Emotional storytelling
- Storylines based on Indian mythology or modern Indian settings

However, unlike most Japanese anime, many Indian productions rely more heavily on CGI rather than traditional 2D animation, largely due to differences in production methods and industry infrastructure.

=== Notable Examples ===
Several Indian animated projects reflect anime-inspired elements:

- Arjun: The Warrior Prince (2012) – an animated film involving the story of Arjuna from the Mahabharata. Its stylized action scenes and dramatic framing show noticeable anime influence.
- Baahubali: The Lost Legends (2017) – An animated extension of the Baahubali franchise, the series features intense battle sequences and serialized storytelling similar to many anime series.
- Roll No 21 (2010) – A children’s television series that combines humor, mythology, and dynamic action scenes.

== See also ==
- ACG (subculture) – "Anime, Comics, and Games", an Asian subculture term
- Anime club – Organization that discusses/celebrates Japanese animation
- Anime convention – Fan convention on anime, manga and Japanese culture in general
- Cosplay – Type of performance art
- Editing of anime in American distribution
- Japanese pop culture in the United States
- Japanophilia – Affinity for Japanese culture
- Science fiction fandom – Subculture of fans who enjoy science fiction
