= Anime Evolution =

British Columbian anime convention

- Anime Evolution's logo.

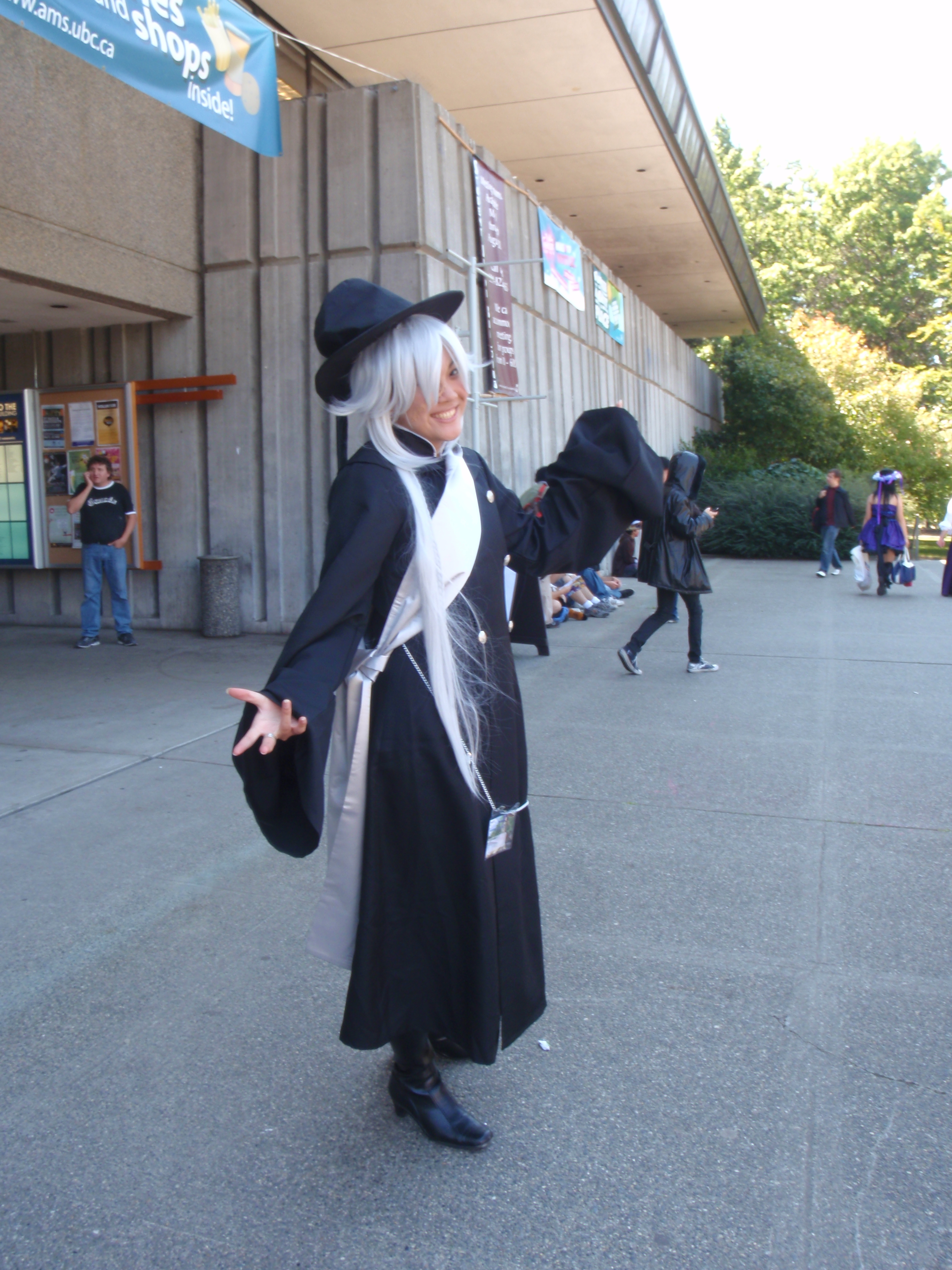
- A cosplayer at Anime Evolution 2010
- Status: Active
- Venue: University of British Columbia
- Locations: Vancouver, British Columbia
- Country: Canada
- Inaugurated: 1998
- Attendance: 7,000 in 2015
- Organizer: Vancouver Anime Convention Society
- Website: https://www.animeevolution.com/

Anime Evolution is the general name for a number of anime conventions held in Metro Vancouver, British Columbia, Canada. It was organized by AE Convention Corp. until 2010 and by the Vancouver Anime Convention Society since 2012. It was traditionally held in August until 2012 before moving to June and then later July. The event was an annual three-day convention, and over time added two single day events, Harumatsuri and Akimatsuri. The summer event, called AE Summer, was shortened to a single day event in 2017. The 2019 Anime Evolution event: Harumatsuri saw a return to a multi-day format and a Burnaby venue.

Despite similar names, Anime Evolution has no connection to Anime Revolution, another Vancouver anime convention.

== Programming ==
Anime Evolution's programming, like many other anime conventions, includes anime screenings, panels, workshops, cosplay events, vendor and artist rooms, and video game groups.

== History ==
Anime Evolution was originally known as Anime Showcase, and was held in 1998 by the SFU ARC club. It was a two-day showing of anime that was supposed to be held annually, with the help of the Vancouver Japanese Animation Society, the University of British Columbia Anime Club, and V-SWAT. In 2001 it was renamed Anime Evolution and in 2003 became a full anime convention. It has grown each year since 1999, and had attendance of over 4,200 people in 2007. In 2008, due to booking issues, it was held at the University of British Columbia (UBC), Vancouver, B.C., rather than its past location at Simon Fraser University (SFU), Burnaby, B.C. In 2010, AE Convention Corp faced a lawsuit enforced by the Canadian Tax Revenue Agency after fraudulent financial statements arose about the convention. Causing the convention to be momentarily defunct. After the lawsuit ended in 2011, Anime Evolution 2011 was cancelled, and future AE Convention Corp sponsored conventions were put on hiatus. Anime Evolution returned in 2012 under the same team but was renamed as the Vancouver Anime Convention Society and ran as a shortened, 2-day version of the convention in November, dubbed Anime Evolution: Akimatsuri. In 2013, Anime Evolution returned to the 3-day summer event format, celebrating its 10th anniversary. In 2014, Anime Evolution teamed up with Cos & Effect and Vancouver Gaming Expo to create Northwest Fan Fest. In 2015, Anime Evolution split from Northwest Fan Fest to once again function as a stand-alone 3-day convention, in addition to their spring event Harumatsuri (previous JFest), and their fall/winter event Akimatsuri. In 2017, Anime Evolution announced that their summer event would only be a 1-day event. On June 26, 2018, they announced on their Facebook Page that the summer convention would not be occurring that year. Since 2017, Anime Evolution has yet to re-run their main summer event.

=== Event history ===
Dates	Location	Attendance	Guests
July 25–27, 2003	Simon Fraser University; Burnaby, British Columbia	1,276	Clio Chiang, Jerry Chu, Michael Coleman, Michael Dobson, Brian Drummond, Susan Luo, Scott McNeil, Joseph Malozzi, Stuart Ng.
August 20–22, 2004	Simon Fraser University; Burnaby, British Columbia	2,005	Rob Bakewell, Alexandra Carter, Michael Coleman, Trevor Devall, Brian Dobson, Michael Dobson, Andrew Francis, David Kaye, Pat Lee, Nicole Leroux, Susan Luo, Joseph Malozzi, Scott McNeil, Joe Ng, Stuart Ng, Run Sasaki.
August 19–21, 2005	Simon Fraser University; Burnaby, British Columbia	2,975	Rob Bakewell, Johnny Yong Bosch, Brooke Burgess, Alexandra Carter, Greg Dean, Todd Demong, Brian Dobson, Michael Dobson, Anthony Gurr, Ian Kirby, Martin L'Heureux, Keith Miller, Kirby Morrow, Tiffany Nours, Sean O'Reilly, Run Sasaki, Brad Swaile, Cathy Weseluck, Andrew West.
August 19–21, 2006	Simon Fraser University; Burnaby, British Columbia	3,602	Alistair Abell, Rob Bakewell, Brooke Burgess, Greg Dean, Liz Dean, Trevor Devall, Michael Dobson, Drive, eqlipsE, Keith and Kosine, Dr. Antonia Levi, Sam Logan, Kevin McKeever, Vic Mignogna, Keith Miller, Kirby Morrow, David Stanworth, Brad Swaile, Cathy Weseluck, ZZ.
August 17–19, 2007	Simon Fraser University; Burnaby, British Columbia	4,200	Back-On, Lisa Ann Beley, Dr. Uwe Boll, Luci Christian, Michael Coleman, Anna Cummer, Trevor Devall, in.ovo, Keith and Kosine, Dr. Antonia Levi, Sam Logan, Joseph Malozzi, Jillian Michaels, Moo-ve, Ron Vark, Nicole Oliver, Scott Ramsoomair, David Stanworth, Brad Swaile, Sam Vincent, XYL.
August 22–24, 2008	University of British Columbia; Vancouver, British Columbia	4,488	Brooke Burgess, Michael Coleman, Michael Daingerfield, Matthew Erickson, Marÿke Hendrikse, Locus, Jocelyne Loewen, Sam Logan, Kevin McKeever, Package #2, Chris Patton, The Slants, David Stanworth, Brad Swaile, Lee Tockar, VI'X, Sam Vincent, Cathy Weseluck, Alex Zahara.
June 12–14, 2009	Vancouver Convention Centre; Vancouver, British Columbia	5,000	Adrian Petriw, Aidan Drummond, Alex Zahara, Andrew Francis, Andrew Kavadas, Autobrig, Brad Swaile, Brian Dobson, Brian Drummond, Cathy Weseluck, Daniel Bacon, David Stanworth, Gabe Khouth, Garry Chalk, Gavin Blair, Ian James Corlett, Ichidan Theatre Group, Jocelyne Loewen, Kristie Marsden, Lee Tockar, Locus, Mark Hildreth, Matthew Erickson, Michael Coleman, Michael Daingerfield, Michael Donovan, Paul Dobson, Richard Ian Cox, Sam Logan, Sam Vincent, Soul Candy, Trevor Devall, Vincent Tong, Angela Melick.
August 13–15, 2010	University of British Columbia; Vancouver, British Columbia	6,150	Adrian Petriw, Alex Zahara, Brian Dobson, Camilla d'Errico, Cathy Weseluck, Chloe Chan (Nuu), Chris Niosi, Chris Smith, The Darkest of the Hillside Thickets, Eiko Ishiwata, EVE (Ever Vast Exemption), Kristie Marsden, Lee Tockar, LoadingReadyRun, Bea Billany (Little Kuriboh), Locus, Matthew Erickson, Mark Oliver, Marÿke Hendrikse, Nina Matsumoto (Space Coyote), Sam Logan, Sam Vincent, Spike Spencer, Team Fourstar, The Beautiful Losers, Angela Melick, Richard Ian Cox, Synaptic Chaos Theatre, Vincent Tong, Carl Horn, Hypergate Studios, Adam Sheehan.
November 3–4, 2012 (AE: Akimatsuri)	Simon Fraser University; Burnaby, British Columbia	2,044	Garry Chalk, Mackenzie Gray, Brendan Hunter, Lauren Landa, Jason C. Miller, Kelly Sheridan, Tabitha St. Germain, Synaptic Chaos Theatre, Lee Tockar, Sam Vincent, Cathy Weseluck.
June 28–30, 2013	University of British Columbia; Vancouver, British Columbia	2,611	Dante Basco, Mackenzie Gray, La Carmina, Yuri Lowenthal, Scott McNeil, Bryce Papenbrook, Tara Platt, Rachel Robinson, Jad Saxton, Sebastiano Serafini, Synaptic Chaos Theatre, Lee Tockar, Team Fourstar.
June 27–29, 2014 (as part of Northwest Fan Fest)	University of British Columbia; Vancouver, British Columbia	3,235	Linda Ballantyne, Fairytale Boutique, The Fictionals, Faye Mata, Scott McNeil, missingNo, Toby Proctor, John Stocker, Kieran Strange
July 17–19, 2015	University of British Columbia; Vancouver, British Columbia	7,000	Michael Daingerfield, Phil Guerrero, Daisuke Sakaguchi, Starktorialist, Synaptic Chaos Theatre, Tarah-Rex, Janet Varney, Sarah Anne Williams
August 19–21, 2016	Sheraton Wall Centre Hotel; Vancouver, British Columbia	6,500~	Steve Blum, DJ Recca, Flying Tonkatsu, Mary Elizabeth McGlynn, Tracey Moore, John Stocker
July 30, 2017	Vancouver Playhouse / Queen Elizabeth Theatre; Vancouver, British Columbia	4,000~	Naoshi Mizuta, A New World
July 27-28, 2019	Nikkei National Museum and Cultural Centre; Burnaby, British Columbia	1,000~	
November 26, 2022 (Akimatsuri)	Kwantlen Polytechnic University; Richmond, British Columbia		
March 25, 2023 (Harumatsuri)	Nikkei National Museum and Cultural Centre; Burnaby, British Columbia		
November 25, 2023 (Akimatsuri)	Kwantlen Polytechnic University; Richmond, British Columbia		
April 20, 2024 (Harumatsuri)	Nikkei National Museum and Cultural Centre; Burnaby, British Columbia		
November 23, 2024 (Akimatsuri)	Kwantlen Polytechnic University; Richmond, British Columbia		
