= Kakafukaka =

Japanese manga series

- Cover of volume 1 of the Japanese version, first released on August 12, 2014

カカフカカ
- Genre: Romance
- Manga
- Written by: Takumi Ishida
- Published by: Kodansha
- English publisher: NA: Kodansha USA
- Imprint: KC Kiss
- Magazine: Kiss
- Original run: October 25, 2013 – November 25, 2020
- Volumes: 12
- Television drama

Kakafukaka: Kojirase Otona no Sharehouse (カカフカカ-こじらせ大人のシェアハウス-)
- Directed by: Momoko Fukuda
- Written by: Kumiko Asō
- Original network: MBS
- Original run: April 25, 2019 – June 28, 2019
- Episodes: 10

Kakafukaka (Japanese: カカフカカ) is a Japanese manga series by Takumi Ishida. Kakafukaka was serialized in the monthly josei manga magazine Kiss from October 25, 2013, to November 25, 2020. A live-action television drama adaptation titled Kakafukaka: Kojirase Otona no Sharehouse (カカフカカ-こじらせ大人のシェアハウス-; lit. "Kakafukaka: The Messed-up Adults' Sharehouse") was broadcast from April 25, 2019, to June 28, 2019, as part of MBS's Drama Tokku programming block.

== Plot ==
Aki Terada, a young woman with no direction in her life, moves out of her apartment after breaking up with her cheating ex-boyfriend. When she moves into a sharehouse, she discovers that one of her new roommates is Tomoya Hongyo, a novelist and her first boyfriend from middle school. Hongyo reveals that he has erectile dysfunction for the past two years but discovers that close proximity with Aki has caused his condition to get better. Deciding to test this further, he asks Aki to sleep with him in his bed, but their relationship begins to escalate the closer they get.

== Characters ==
Aki Terada (寺田 亜希, Terada Aki)
Portrayed by: Aoi Morikawa
Aki is a 24-year-old freeter with no direction in her life. She moves into a sharehouse after leaving her ex-boyfriend.
Tomoya Hongyo (本行 智也, Hongyō Tomoya)
Portrayed by: Masaki Nakao
Hongyo is a novelist and Aki's boyfriend from middle school. He reveals to Aki that he has erectile dysfunction since two years ago, but he realizes that being physically close to her makes his condition better, and, as a result, asks her to sleep in his bed with him.
Taichi Hase (長谷 太一, Hase Taichi)
Portrayed by: Kousei Yuki
Hase is the owner of the sharehouse. He is Hongyo's former editor. Despite not having genuine interest in marriage nor romance, he proposes to Aki out of his parents pressuring him to get married, initially because of their compatible lifestyles. He eventually comes to love Aki for real. His distorted views of love came from his strained relationship with his mother and he is easily repulsed by women who get too physically close to him.
Akari Kuritani (栗谷 あかり, Kuritani Akari)
Portrayed by: Risa Nakamura
Akari is a woman living at the sharehouse who works at a design company. She is a fan of Hongyo.

== Media ==
=== Manga ===
Kakafukaka is written and illustrated by Takumi Ishida. It was serialized in the monthly manga magazine Kiss beginning in the December 2013 issue released on October 25, 2013 to the January 2021 issue released on November 25, 2020. The chapters were later released in twelve bound volumes by Kodansha under the Kiss Comics imprint.

Ishida had created the series to challenge the ideas of traditional love, as shōjo manga typically valued emotional aspects of love over physical aspects. In doing so, she placed equal focus on both aspects of love, claiming that they were "connected."

In 2018, Kodansha USA announced that they had licensed the series in English for North American distribution, with the volumes distributed digitally.

No.	Original release date	Original ISBN	English release date	English ISBN
1	August 12, 2014	978-4-06-340933-8	July 17, 2018	978-1-6421-2313-5
2	July 13, 2015	978-4-0634-0959-8	August 21, 2018	978-1-6421-2314-2
3	May 13, 2016	978-4-0634-0989-5	November 27, 2018	978-1-6421-2543-6
4	December 13, 2016	978-4-0639-8006-6	January 22, 2019	978-1-6421-2609-9
5	August 10, 2017	978-4-0639-8026-4	March 26, 2019	978-1-6421-2703-4
6	February 13, 2018	978-4-0651-0879-6	April 23, 2019	978-1-6421-2795-9
7	August 12, 2014	978-4-06-340933-8	May 21, 2019	978-1-6421-2832-1
8	February 13, 2019	978-4-0651-4231-8	July 21, 2020	978-1-6421-2920-5
9	August 9, 2019	978-4-0651-6723-6	December 31, 2019	978-1-6465-9188-6
10	March 13, 2020	978-4-0651-9003-6	July 28, 2020	978-1-6465-9609-6
11	September 11, 2020	978-4-0652-0752-9	December 22, 2020	978-1-6465-9873-1
12	March 12, 2021	978-4-0652-2724-4	July 20, 2021	978-1-6369-9236-5

=== Television drama ===
A live-action television series adaptation titled Kakafukaka: Kojirase Otona no Sharehouse (カカフカカ-こじらせ大人のシェアハウス-) was announced on March 24, 2019. The series aired on April 25, 2019, on MBS as the flagship show of their new Drama Tokku programming block, with other broadcasts on TV Kanagawa, Television Saitama, and Amazon Prime Video. It stars Aoi Morikawa as Aki, Masaki Nakao as Hongyo, Kousei Yuki as Hase, and Risa Nakamura as Akari. The series is directed by Momoko Fukuda, with Kumiko Asō in charge of the script. The opening theme song is "Like That!!" by lol. The ending theme song is "Suki da yo (My Love)" by BoA.

== Reception ==
In 2019, Kakafukaka had sold a consecutive total of 1.7 million physical copies. It was selected as one of the recommended shōjo manga by an editor of Cheese! at the Shōjo Manga Fes 2018.
