= Kousei Yuki =

Japanese actor (born 1994)

- 結木 滉星
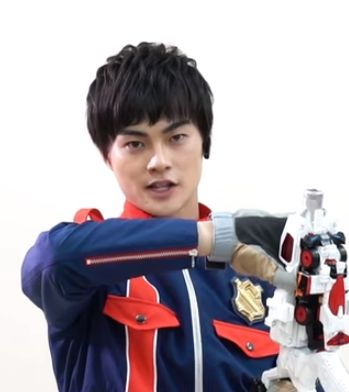
- Kousei as Keiichiro Asaka/Patren Ichi-Gou from Kaitou Sentai Lupinranger VS Keisatsu Sentai Patranger
- Born: 10 December 1994 (age 31); Ōita Prefecture
- Years active: 2012–present
- Agent: Stardust Promotion
- Relatives: Kaoru Mitoma (brother)
- Website: Profile by office

Kousei Yuki (結木 滉星, Yūki Kōsei; born 10 December 1994) is a Japanese actor. He is represented by Stardust Promotion (Section 2).

== Filmography ==
=== TV anime ===
- Pankisu! 2-Jigen (2015) – as Poko Birdland

=== TV dramas ===
- Mischievous Kiss: Love in Tokyo, Episode 1 (2013), [High school student]
- Baseball Brainiacs (2014), Kimiyasu Kudo
- Onīchan, Gacha (2015)
- Kaitou Sentai Lupinranger VS Keisatsu Sentai Patranger (2018), Keiichiro Asaka/Patren Ichi-Gou
- Kakafukaka (2019), Taichi Hase
- Time Limit Investigator 2019, Episode 3 (2019), Keisuke Kinosaki
- The Story of National Defence Academy (2019), Tadashi Harada
- Panda Judges the World Episode 5-6 (2020), Yoichi Nakanobe
- Only I Am 17 Years Old (2020), Iori Ishikawa
- Ginza Black Cat Story, Episode 6 (2020)
- Cursed in Love, Episode 1 (2020), Endo
- The Dangerous Venus (2020), Hikaru Kimitsu
- Miyako Has Arrived in Kyoto! (2021), Atsuhiko
- Kazama Kimichika: Kyojo Zero (2023), Yawara Oyama
- Brothers in Arms (2026), Oda Nobutaka

=== Films ===
- Make a Bow and Kiss (2017), Shotaro Endo
- Genin: Blue Shadow (2019)
- Genin: Red Shadow (2019)
- Kishiryu Sentai Ryusoulger VS Lupinranger VS Patranger the Movie (2020), Keiichiro Asaka
- Nagi's Island (2022), Kōhei Moriya
- Vanishing World (2025), Mizuuchi
- Kingdom 5: The Clash of Souls (2026), Xiang Yi
- Underdog (2027), Fujishima
- The Gate of Murder (2027), Kazuki Hirose

=== Stage ===
- Pankisu! 3-Jigen
- Stage Super Danganronpa 2 The Stage –Sayonara Zetsubō Gakuen– 2017 – as Izuru Kamukura
- Ebisu Chili Dan 5th stage performance Nord
- Stage Hyper Production Engeki haikyū!! "Shinka no Natsu" – as Keiji Akaashi

== Personal life ==
His younger brother, Kaoru Mitoma, is a professional footballer who plays for Brighton and the Japan national football team. Both of them were born in Ōita Prefecture and raised in Kawasaki.
