= Diner (2019 film) =

2019 Japanese film

- Theatrical release poster
- Directed by: Mika Ninagawa
- Written by: Yumeaki Hirayama
- Based on: Diner; 2009 novel by Yumeaki Hirayama
- Produced by: Morio Amagi; Takuya Itô; Mitsuru Uda
- Starring: Tatsuya Fujiwara; Tina Tamashiro
- Cinematography: Daisuke Sôma
- Edited by: Hiroaki Morishita
- Music by: Shinichi Osawa
- Distributed by: Warner Bros. Pictures
- Release dates: June 2019 (SIFF); July 5, 2019 (Japan)
- Running time: 117 minutes
- Country: Japan
- Language: Japanese

Diner (Japanese: ダイナー) is a 2019 Japanese crime film directed by Mika Ninagawa and written by Yumeaki Hirayama, based on a novel by Hirayama and a subsequent manga series by Takanori Kawai. The film stars Tina Tamashiro as Kanako, a young woman who is hired as a waitress at a restaurant owned by chef and former hitman Bombero (Tatsuya Fujiwara) that caters exclusively to professional killers.

Diner premiered at the Shanghai International Film Festival in China in June 2019, and was released in Japan on 5 July 2019.

== Cast ==
- Tatsuya Fujiwara as Bombero
- Tina Tamashiro as Kanako Oba
- Masataka Kubota as Skin
- Kanata Hongō as Kid
- Eiji Okuda as Coffie
- Anna Tsuchiya as Maria
- Miki Maya as Bureizu
- Sakura Miyawaki as a waitress
- Risa Nakamura as a waitress
- Mademoiselle Yulia as a waitress
- Amiaya as waitresses

== Critical reception ==
In a review of the film published by The Hollywood Reporter, it is written that "The entertainment quotient is high and should hit the outré spot with local teen audiences and manga addicts in general." Mark Schilling of The Japan Times gave the film a score of two-and-a-half out of five stars, writing that its visuals are "in the service of a thin story", and concluding: "A bacchanalia of the senses that threatens to end in stupefaction and silliness, Diner becomes a cracked ode to feminine power."
