= Masatoshi Nakamura =

Japanese actor and singer

- 中村 雅俊
- Born: 1 February 1951 (age 75); Onagawa, Miyagi, Japan
- Occupations: Actor, singer
- Years active: 1974–present
- Spouse: Junko Igarashi (m. 1977; died 2026)
- Children: 1 son, 3 daughters, including Risa Nakamura
- Website: columbia.jp/artist-info/masatoshi/ http://tomonokai.mj-e.com/

Masatoshi Nakamura (中村 雅俊, Nakamura Masatoshi; born February 1, 1951) is a Japanese actor and singer from Onagawa, Miyagi. He graduated from Keio University.

Nakamura joined the Bungakuza theater troupe in 1973 and made his television debut in 1974 with "Warera Seishun. Masatoshi made his film debut with "Fureai" in the same year . He won his first major award at the Elan d'or Awards in 1975. In 1977, he married actress Junko Igarashi until her death on April 28, 2026. In 2012, he played the role of Fumimaro Konoe in the Peter Webber's film Emperor.

As a singer his first single "Fureai" peaked at number 1 in the Japanese single record chart in 1974. Besides "Fureai" he has several other hit songs such as "Oretachi no Tabi" and "Koibito mo Nureru Machikado". "Nakamura appeared in the Kōhaku Uta Gassen in 1982 and 2012.

== Selected filmography ==
=== Film ===
Title	Date	Role	Notes	Ref.
Fureai	1974	Hisashi Yamawaki		
Bochann	1977	Daisuke Kondō		
Tora-san Plays Cupid	1977	Ryōsuke Shimada		
Akumagakitarite Fuewofuku	1979	Sakuzo		
Hashire Ichiro	2001	Ichiro Ishikawa		
Hinokio	2005	Kaoru Iwamoto		
American Pastime	2007		American film	
Tokugawa Fūunroku Hachidai Shōgun Yoshimune	2008	Tokugawa Yoshimune		
Leonie	2010	Toshu Senda		
Yoake no Machi de	2011			
Emperor	2012	Fumimaro Konoe	American-Japanese film	
A Tale of Samurai Cooking	2013	Narrator		
Sakura Guardian in the North	2018			
The Three Sisters of Tenmasou Inn	2022			
Touch	2024	Kutaragi-san	British-Icelandic film	
Sunset Sunrise	2025			
Our Journey for 50 years	2026	Kōsuke Tsumura (Karsuke)	Lead role, also director	

=== Television ===
Title	Date	Role	Notes	Ref.
Warera Seishun	1974	Shun Okita	Lead role	
Oretachi no Kunshō	1975	Takahisa Igarashi	Lead role	
Oretachi no Tabi	1975	Kōsuke Tsumura (Karsuke)	Lead role	
Kashin	1977	Takasugi Shinsaku	Taiga drama	
Yuhigaokano Soridaijin	1978	Yujiro Oiwa	Lead role	
Onna Taikō-ki	1981	Toyotomi Hidenaga	Taiga drama	
Oshin	1983	Shunsaku	Asadora	
Hissatsu Watashinin	1984	Sota	Lead role; Hissatsu series	
Hokorino Hōshu	1985	Haruki Serizawa	Lead role	
Byakkotai	1986	Sakamoto Ryōma	Miniseries	
Kasuga no Tsubone	1989	Tokugawa Hidetada	Taiga drama	
Yonigeya Honpo	1999	Masahiko Genji	Lead role	
Oyaji Tantei	2001	Kōauke Saotome	Lead role	
Musashi	2003	Sanada Yukimura	Taiga drama	
Half Blue Sky	2018	Senkichi Nireno	Asadora	
Two Homelands	2019	Kisaburō Yokoyama	Miniseries	
Date My Daughter!	2021	Shunichirō Oda		
The Forbidden Magic	2022	Kazurō Ukai	Special appearance; TV movie	
House of the Owl	2024	Takeuchi		
The Shogunate Rebel	2027	Asaka Gonsai	Taiga drama	

=== Dubbing ===
- Chicken Little (Buck Cluck)

== Selected discography ==
=== Albums ===
- Fureai (1974)
- Sayonarano Suigara (1976)
- Omoideno Kakera (1976)
- Karashiiro no Arubamu (1977)
- Seishun Horoki (1978)
- Shy Guy Masatoshi (1979)
- Kimito Keita E (1980)
- Restoration (1982)
- BORN NEW (1983)
- MONDAY MORNING BLUES (1984)
- OUVas-tu? (1985)
- MONO (1986)
- I LOVE YOU, ALL (1987)
- Ordinary Life (1988)
- ACROSS THE UNIVERSE (1988)
- Tokino Shozo (1991)
- Rabu songwo Okuritai (1993)
- HEART OF ENERGY (1994)
- WITHOUT YOU (1996)
- Ah Seishun (1999)
- STEPPING STONES (2000)
- Wasurenai MASATOSHI NAKAMURA 40th Anniversary (2014)
- Masatoshi Nakamura 45th Anniversary Single Collection 〜yes! on the way〜 (2019)

=== Singles ===
- "Fureai" (1974)
- "Shiroishashinkan" (1974)
- "Itsuka Machide Attanara" (1975)
- "Oretachi no Tabi" (1975)
- "Bongaeri" (1976)
- "Oretachi no Matsuri" (1977)
- "Jidaiokureno Kuibitotach" (1978)
- "Kokorono Iro" (1981)
- "Koibitomo Nurerumachikado" (1982)
- "Hittokino Ai" (1983)
- "Sayonaraga Einakute" (1987)
- "Anataniagetai Aigaaru" (1989)
- "Kazeno Sumumachi" (1990)
- "Zackbaran" (1991)
- "Aiwakokoniaru" (1997)
- "Kanashi Hito" (1999)
- "Aitsu" (2001)
- "Utsusemi" (2005)
- "Namida" (2008)
- "Hajimeteno Sora" (2015)
- "Naraba Kazetoike" (2016)
- "Dokoetokiga Nagaretemo" (2017)
- "Daro!!" (2018)
