= Risa Nakamura =

Japanese fashion model and actress

- 中村 里砂
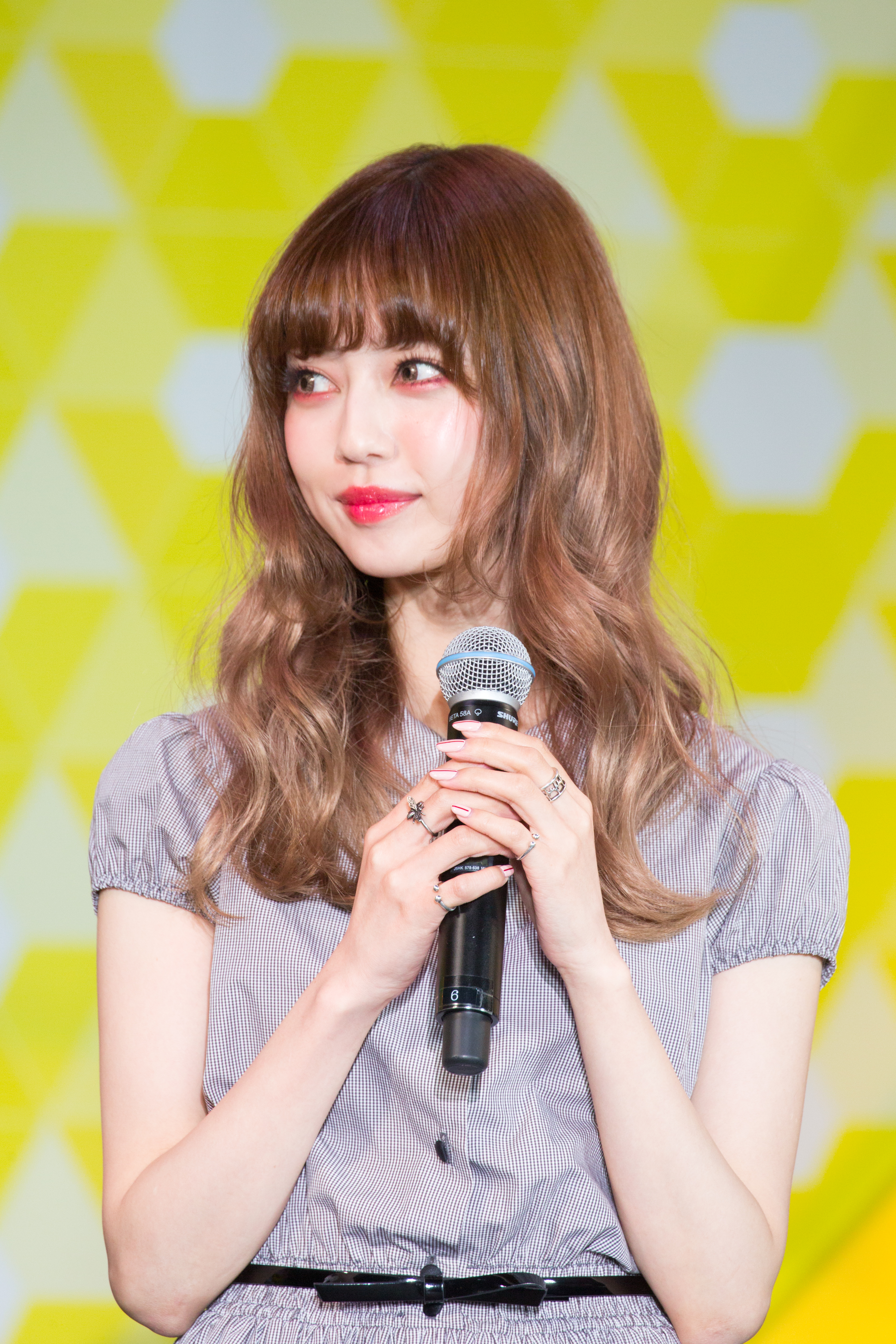
- Nakamura at Super! C Channel 2017
- Born: July 12, 1989 (age 37); Tokyo, Japan
- Occupations: Model; actress; television personality; businessperson
- Years active: 2010–present
- Height: 160 cm (5 ft 3 in)
- Parents: Masatoshi Nakamura (father); Junko Igarashi (mother)
- Relatives: Shunta Nakamura (brother)

Risa Nakamura (Japanese: 中村 里砂, Hepburn: Nakamura Risa; born July 12, 1989) is a Japanese model, actress, television personality, and businessperson. Nakamura debuted as a model in 2010 and modeled for the fashion magazines Larme, Gothic & Lolita Bible, Bis, and Peche, in addition to making regular runway appearances at the Kansai Collection and Tokyo Girls Collection fashion events since 2015. She is also the brand model for the lolita fashion brand Angelic Pretty.

Nakamura made her first acting appearance in the film Shōjo Tsubaki (2016) and continued to appear in the live-action drama for Kakafukaka (2019) and the film Diner (2019). In addition to her career, Nakamura has produced several fashion labels, as well as the girl groups Eden and Meowmew.

== Career ==
=== Modeling career ===
Nakamura debuted as a model in 2010. In 2013, she became a regular model for the fashion magazine Larme and modeled for the magazine until 2024. While modeling for Larme, she appeared in the promotional campaign for the magazine's collaboration with the eyewear brand Alook. She was also a regular model for the magazine Gothic & Lolita Bible. She has also made appearances in the magazines ViVi, Women's Wear Daily Japan, Vogue Japan, and Spur, as well as catalogs for the fashion brands Milk and Katie. In February 2014, she made her first television appearance on the variety show The Most Useful School in the World, marking her first appearance as a television personality.

Nakamura made her first runway appearance at the Kobe Collection 2014 Autumn/Winter show. In September 2014, she appeared at the Tokyo Runway 2014 Autumn/Winter show. In October 2014, Nakamura also modeled at the GirlsAward 2014 Autumn/Winter show. Since 2014, Nakamura has modeled for the lolita fashion brand Angelic Pretty and is currently their image model.

In February 2015, Nakamura modeled at the Tokyo Girls Collection 2015 Spring/Summer show. In May 2015, she modeled at the Tokyo Girls Collection Campus 2015 show. In the same month, she released her first photobook, Risa Nakamura First Style Book: Risa Doll. Later in the year, she appeared at the 2015 Autumn/Winter shows for the Kansai Collection and the Tokyo Girls Collection runway events.

Nakamura modeled for the 2016 Spring/Summer shows for the Kansai Collection and the Tokyo Girls Collection runway events. She appeared in promotional media wearing a bra made from Pikachu plushies for a collaboration between Pokémon and the women's lingerie and apparel brand Yummy Mart. At the end of the year, she modeled for the 2016 Autumn/Winter shows for the Kansai Collection and Tokyo Girls Collection runway events. In 2017, Nakamura became a regular model for the fashion magazine Bis and modeled for the magazine until 2025. She modeled for the 2017 Spring/Summer shows for the Kansai Collection and the Tokyo Girls Collection runway events. Later in the year, she modeled at the 2017 Autumn/Winter shows for the Kansai Collection and the Tokyo Girls Collection runway events, as well as Tokyo Girls' Collection's regional events in Kitakyushu and Hiroshima.

Nakamura modeled for the 2018 Spring/Summer shows for the Kansai Collection and the Tokyo Girls Collection runway events. She later modeled for the 2018 Autumn/Winter shows for the Kansai Collection and the Tokyo Girls Collection runway events. She modeled for the 2019 Spring/Summer shows for the Kansai Collection and the Tokyo Girls Collection runway events. Later, in the year, she modeled at the Kansai Collection 2019 Autumn/Winter show.

In 2020, Nakamura became a regular model for the fashion magazine Peche. She was announced to make an appearance at the Kansai Collection 2020 Spring/Summer show, but the event was canceled due to the COVID-19 pandemic. She later modeled for the Tokyo Girls Collection 2020 Autumn/Winter show. Nakamura modeled for the Kansai Collection 2021 Autumn/Winter show, and in the following year, she modeled for the Tokyo Girls Collection 2022 Autumn/Winter show. She modeled for the Kansai Collection 2023 Autumn/Winter show, the Sapporo Collection 2025 Spring/Summer show, and the 2025 Okinawa Collection. In the next year, Nakamura modeled for the 2026 Spring/Summer shows for the Tokyo Girls Collection and Sapporo Collection events.

=== Acting career ===
Nakamura made her acting debut in the 2016 film adaptation of Shōjo Tsubaki, where she starred as Midori. In 2019, she was cast as Akari in the live-action television drama adaptation of Kakafukaka. She also played a waitress in the 2019 film Diner.

=== Other ventures ===
Nakamura has released collaboration kimono lines with Kyoto Marubeni and Kyoto Kimono Kobo. She has also released several collaboration apparel lines with the fashion brand Swankiss. From 2016 to 2018, Nakamura was the general producer of the fashion label E-hyphen World Gallery BonBon. In November 2018, she launched a line of color contact lens called Usagi.

Nakamura later created her own apparel, cosmetics, and fragrance brand called Somatic Store. In 2021, she also launched her own lifestyle brand, Philosophia, which later closed in May 2026. In 2022, she produced Bism, a line of sheet masks. In 2025, Nakamura created and produced the idol groups Eden and Meowmew.

== Personal life ==
Nakamura's father is singer Masatoshi Nakamura and her mother was actress Junko Igarashi. She is the youngest of three daughters and has an older brother named Shunta Nakamura, a former actor.

== Publications ==
Year	Title	Publisher	ISBN
2015	Risa Nakamura First Style Book: Risa Doll (中村里砂FIRST STYLE BOOK RISADOLL)	Tokuma Shoten	ISBN 978-4198639501
2016	Risa Nakamura Beauty Style Book: Risa Beaut'e (中村里砂ビューティスタイルブック『RISA BEAUT'E』)	Takarajimasha	ISBN 978-4800260833

== Filmography ==
=== Film ===
Year	Title	Role	Notes	Ref.
2016	Shōjo Tsubaki	Midori	Debut film role	
2019	Diner	Waitress	Cameo	

=== Television ===
Year	Title	Role	Notes	Ref.
2019	Kakafukaka	Akari Kuritani		
