= Anime Revolution =

Japanese anime and gaming convention in Vancouver

- Status: Active
- Venue: Vancouver Convention Centre; Metro Toronto Convention Centre
- Locations: Vancouver, British Columbia; Toronto, Ontario
- Country: Canada
- Inaugurated: August 17, 2012
- Attendance: 25,128 (2019)
- Organizer: Anime Revolution Events Inc.
- Website: www.animerevolution.ca

Anime Revolution (abbreviated as Anirevo) is a three-day anime convention held annually in August in Vancouver, BC. Initially held in the East Wing of the Vancouver Convention Centre (Canada Place), it has been held in the newer West Wing since 2017 before expanding eastward to Toronto's Metro Toronto Convention Centre beginning in 2025.

While the name is similar, the convention has no connection to Anime Evolution.

== Programming ==
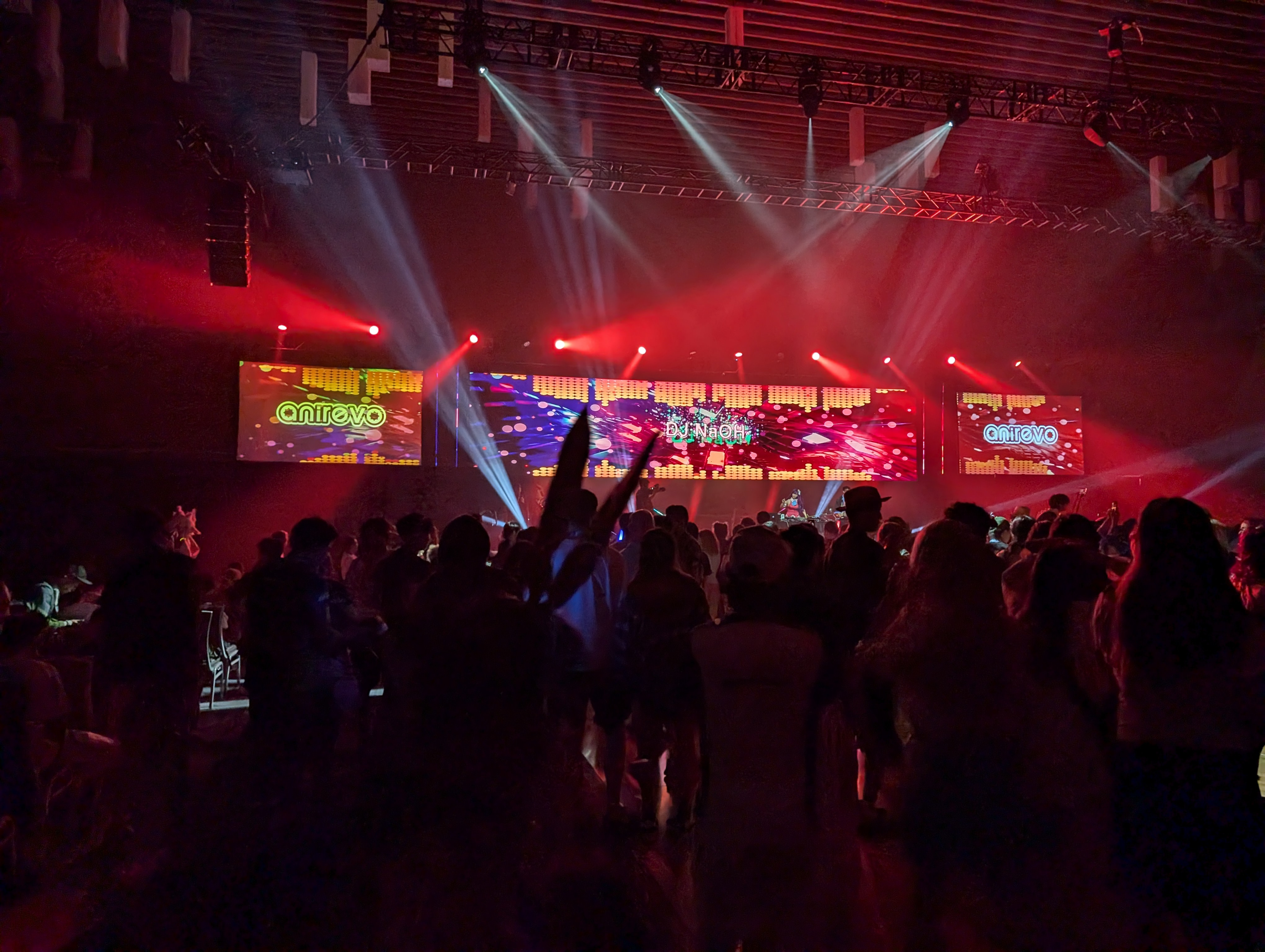
Rave event at Anime Revolution 2024.

Anime Revolution is notable for being the first anime convention in Vancouver to host voice actor guests from Japan and often features high-profile recording session performances. They also regularly bring in representatives from North American anime distributors such as Bandai and Crunchyroll. Their regular programming includes anime and AMV screenings, voice actor panels, as well as stage events including cosplay shows and the 70s Anime Dating Show. Other events have included contests, industry/fan panels, workshops, vendor and artist rooms, video game groups, concerts, raves/masquerades and photo shoots.

== Mascot ==
The Mascot for Anime Revolution is Senkaku Mei, or Senmei for short. She is a blunt, spontaneous, energetic attention grabber who loves to be the center of attention. She can usually be found dressed in her race-queen outfit with her two mini megaphones. A live action version of Senmei was portrayed by cosplay model Jessica Nigri in 2013.

== History ==
Anime Revolution was launched in 2012 to meet demand for a new anime-focused convention in Metro Vancouver, after Anime Evolution (run by AE Convention Corp) had been cancelled in 2010. The convention was founded by Can Ngo, who serves as its current president.

Since it began, the convention has grown significantly, being the first anime convention in Metro Vancouver to surpass 10,000 attendees and eventually expanding its audience to more areas of Japanese pop culture such as gunpla and maid cafés.

As of 2026, it is the largest anime convention in Western Canada.

From 2016 to 2020, a separate winter event was also held, but has now been discontinued in favour of a single annual summer convention.

The event was cancelled from 2020 to 2021 due to the COVID-19 pandemic. It resumed in 2022, with masks being mandatory.

In 2025, Anime Revolution expanded to Eastern Canada with the launch of Anime Revolution Toronto. The inaugural event was held from November 21 to 23 at the Metro Toronto Convention Centre.

=== Event history ===
==== Anime Revolution Vancouver ====
Dates	Location	Attendance	Guests
August 17–19, 2012	Vancouver Convention Centre; Vancouver, British Columbia	5,233	Noah Antwiler, Stephanie Beard, Vincent Corazza, Sarah Edmondson, Fighting Dreamers Productions, Katie Griffin, Terri Hawkes, Irulanne, Sam Logan, Katie Marsden, Angela "Jam" Melick, Jouji Nakata, Mark Nguyen, Jessica Nigri, Susan Roman, Ron Rubin, Lee Tockar, Doug Walker.
August 16–18, 2013	Vancouver Convention Centre; Vancouver, British Columbia	7,326	The 404s, Angelic Pretty, Fighting Dreamers Productions, Toru Furuya, Caitlin Glass, Todd Haberkorn, Cherami Leigh, Vic Mignogna, Jessica Nigri, Origa, Newton Pittman, Dean Redman, Chantal Strand, Doug Walker, Kappei Yamaguchi.
August 22–24, 2014	Vancouver Convention Centre; Vancouver, British Columbia	12,177	The 404s, Angelic Pretty, Fighting Dreamers Productions, Yaya Han, Marina Inoue, Mike McFarland, Lindze Merrit, Vic Mignogna, Jessica Nigri, Megumi Ogata, Origa, Lisa Ortiz, Dean Redman, Michael Sinterniklaas.
August 14–15, 2015	Vancouver Convention Centre; Vancouver, British Columbia	~15,000	The 404s, Yuu Asakawa, Laura Bailey, Richard Ian Cox, Fighting Dreamers Productions, Grant George, Nobuyuki Hiyama, Kotoko, Dean Redman, Takeshi Takedera, Thelshter, Greg Wicker, Travis Willingham.
August 5–7, 2016	Vancouver Convention Centre; Vancouver, British Columbia	~17,000	The 404s, Caitlyn Bairstow, Yugene Fay, Fighting Dreamers Productions, Ayumi Fujimura, Tiffany Grant, Loverin Tamburin, Tony Oliver, Romi Park, Chris Patton, Toshihiko Seki, The Slants, Takeshi Takedera, Cristina Vee, Greg Wicker.
August 4–6, 2017	Vancouver Convention Centre; Vancouver, British Columbia	~20,000	The 404s, Fighting Dreamers Productions, Katsuyuki Konishi, Kana Ueda, Shizuka Itō, Emiri Katō, Takeshi Takadera, DJ WILDPARTY, MON 夢, STAYXXXX, Lady Zero, Narcisse, Alyson Tabbitha, Junkers, J5, Austin Tindle, Erica Lindbeck, Aaron Dismuke, Todd Haberkorn, ProJared, Digitrevx.
August 3–5, 2018	Vancouver Convention Centre; Vancouver, British Columbia	~20,000	Kappei Yamaguchi, Marina Inoue, Satsuki Yukino, Hitomi Nabatame, Takeshi Takadera, TeddyLoid, Clifford Chapin, Baozi & Hana, SungWon Cho, Sarah Wiedenheft, Richard Ian Cox, Fighting Dreamers Productions, Baylee Jae, The 404s, The Fictionals, Jacob Powers.
August 9–11, 2019	Vancouver Convention Centre; Vancouver, British Columbia	25,128	The 404s, Asaka, SungWon Cho, Takeshi Takadera, David Vincent.
July 29–31, 2022	Vancouver Convention Centre; Vancouver, British Columbia		The 404's, Graham Hamilton, Tōru Furuya, Katsuyuki Konishi, Brian Drummond, Toby Proctor, Cathy Weseluck.
August 18–20, 2023	Vancouver Convention Centre; Vancouver, British Columbia		The 404's, Graham Hamilton, Terri Hawkes, Bryce Papenbrook, Ninomae Ina'nis, Masakazu Morita, Takeshi Takadera, Ian Hanlin, Caitlyn Bairstow, Brian Doe Chua
August 9–11, 2024	Vancouver Convention Centre; Vancouver, British Columbia		The 404's, Jonah Scott, Griffin Burns, Ben Balmaceda, Graham Hamilton, A.K. Wirru, FearFiction, Twinfools, Sakura Elric, Dokibird, Yurie Igoma, Megumi Han, Rumi Okubo, Takeshi Takadera, TRUE, ZAQ, DJ NaoH
August 1–3, 2025	Vancouver Convention Centre; Vancouver, British Columbia		The 404s, Amber Lee Connors, Graham Hamilton, Ian Hanlin, Cole Howard, Reiji Kawashima, Minami Kuribayashi, DJ NaOH, Zeno Robinson, Takeshi Takadera, Suzie Yeung
July 31-August 2, 2026	Vancouver Convention Centre; Vancouver, British Columbia		

==== Anime Revolution Toronto ====
Dates	Location	Attendance	Guests
November 21–23, 2025	Metro Toronto Convention Centre; Toronto, Ontario		
November 13–15, 2026	Metro Toronto Convention Centre; Toronto, Ontario		

== Controversies ==
=== Sex offender attendance ===
In 2019, Anime Revolution faced intense criticism after allowing convicted sex offenders Bram Kleiman and Alex McMullen to attend the event. Kleiman had been previously banned from Anime Revolution due to harassment. However, he attempted to attend the convention anyways, leading to a confrontation with president Can Ngo upon his arrival. A letter from Kleiman's psychiatrist was presented which stated that he was not a threat to the public, and his mother informed Ngo that Kleiman would be attending with his girlfriend as a chaperone. Additionally, Kleiman used his autism spectrum disorder diagnosis as an explanation for his past behaviour. Based on this information, Ngo ultimately chose to allow Kleiman to attend the event. McMullen attended the event for one day but left early due to posts circulating about his presence at AniRevo. On August 15, 2019, an apology was posted on Anime Revolution's website for allowing the two individuals to attend. They were explicitly banned from all future events.
