= Angelic Pretty =

Japanese apparel brand

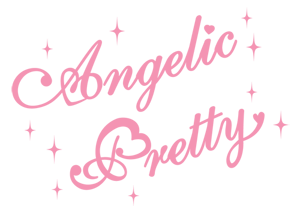

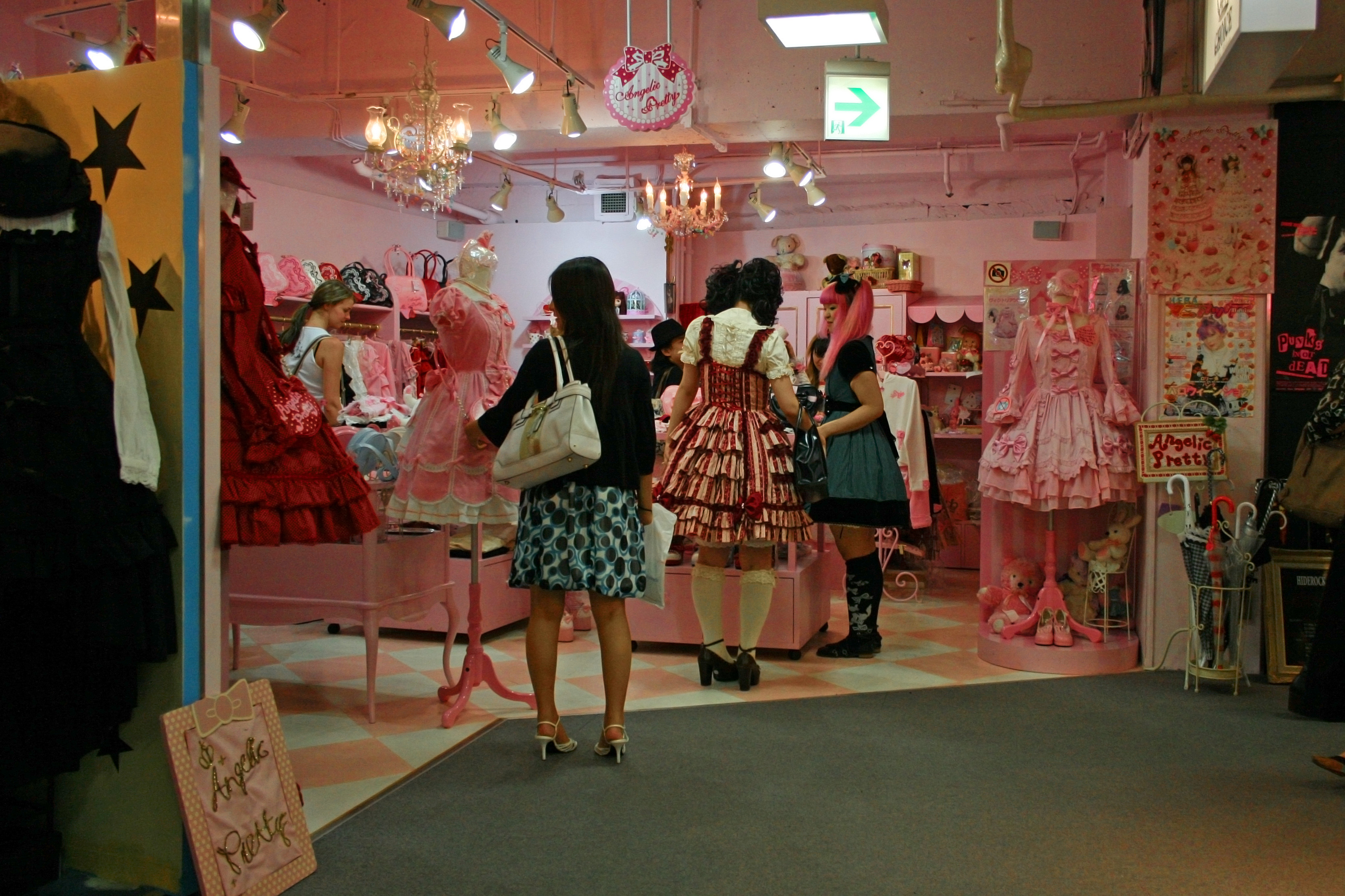
- Angelic Pretty store in Harajuku, Tokyo (2007)
- Formerly: Pretty (1979–2001)
- Industry: Apparel
- Founded: 1979 in Harajuku, Tokyo, Japan
- Founder: Hiroko Honda
- Headquarters: Harajuku, Tokyo, Japan
- Areas served: Japan; United States; France; China
- Key people: Maki (designer); Asuka (designer)
- Products: Apparel
- Website: angelicpretty.com

Angelic Pretty (formerly Pretty from 1979–2001) is a Japanese apparel brand specializing in lolita fashion. The brand was established as Pretty in 1979 by Hiroko Honda, with its flagship store opened at Laforet in the Harajuku region of Tokyo, Japan, selling apparel from amateur designers. After Honda decided to focus on original apparel, the store was rebranded as Angelic Pretty in 2001.

== Brand concept ==
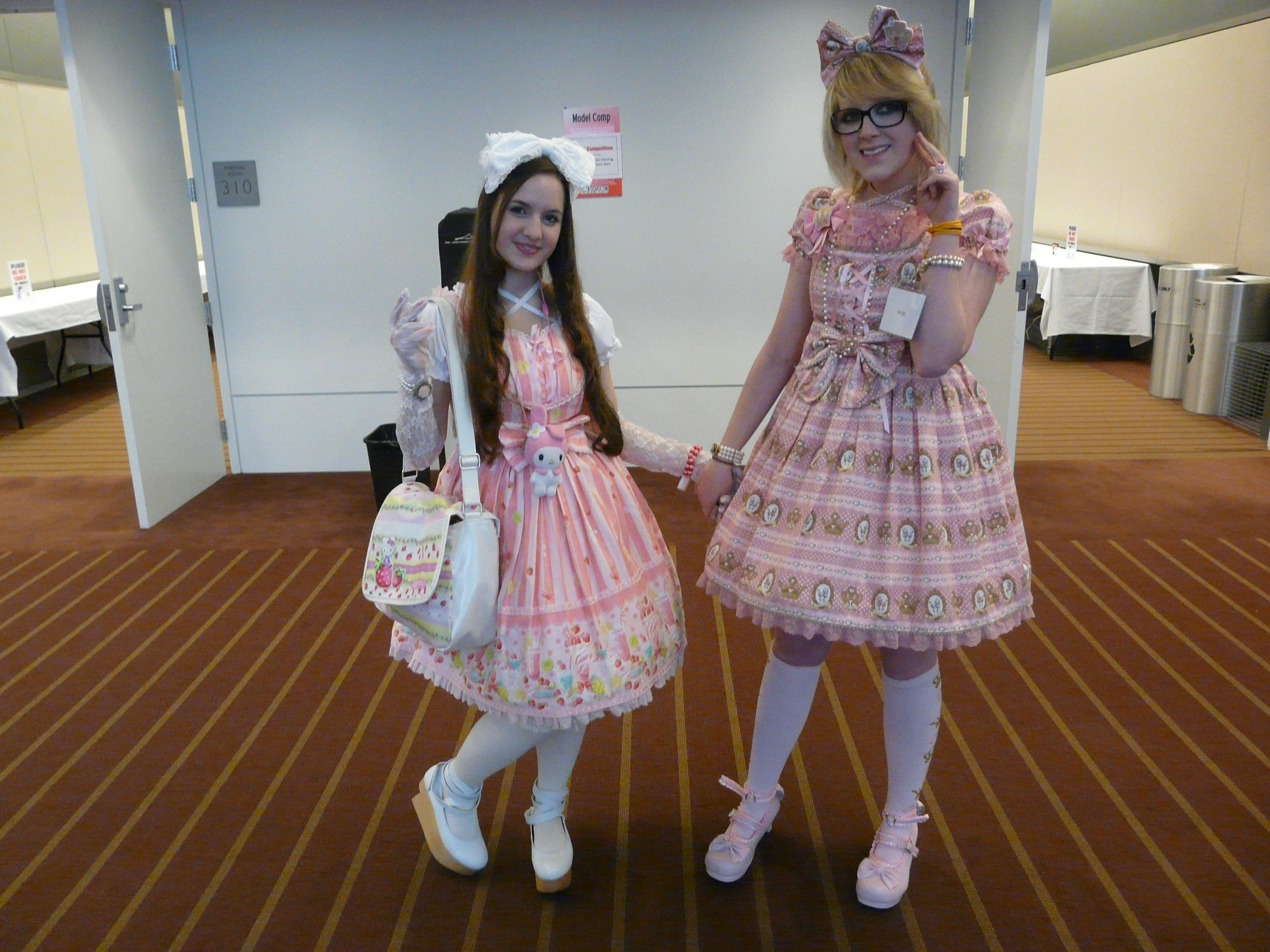
Two people wearing dresses from Angelic Pretty at Tekkoshocon 2010

Angelic Pretty is a "sweet lolita" fashion brand with focus on the "cute" and "child-like." Angelic Pretty's concept is centered on fantasy and described as "princesses in picture books that were dreamed of as a child". The store and clothing all use the color pink, with different shades and arrangements corresponding to the season and fashion trends.

== History ==
In 1979, Hiroko Honda opened Pretty at Laforet in Harajuku, Tokyo, selling lolita and gothic style dresses from amateur designers. Honda curated her selection based on cuteness. She stated that, at the time, Pretty was one of the only retailers in Tokyo that sold lolita clothing. Around 2000, Honda decided to focus on creating original apparel based on her aesthetics after customer feedback, which led to the launch of her original label, Angelic Pretty, in 2002. Honda then focused on growing her Angelic Pretty brand and renamed the store after the brand in 2003 after opening a second location in Nagoya. Afterwards, Asuka joined as a designer in 2001, initially to design cutsews, knit clothing, bags, and accessories. Maki joined shortly after in 2003 while she was in vocational school, initially as an illustrator. Both Asuka and Maki later became full-time designers at Angelic Pretty. Kira Imai was scouted as Angelic Pretty's image illustrator shortly after she graduated from junior college when they saw her illustrations on her website.

In 2004, Angelic Pretty launched their next stores in Osaka and Utsunomiya. This was followed by a store opening in Sendai in 2005, as well as Hiroshima and Yokohama in 2006. In 2007, Angelic Pretty decided to test the overseas market by appearing at Japan Expo in France and Pacific Media Expo. By February 2008, Angelic Pretty had an English version of their website and allowed people outside of Japan to purchase their clothing. On August 16, 2013, Angelic Pretty held their first fashion show in Canada as part of Anime Revolution.

From October 26 to October 27, 2018, Angelic Pretty held a two-day exhibit titled "Angelic Pretty Museum" at Laforet Museum Harajuku.

== Products ==
Angelic Pretty sells petticoat dresses, blouses, jewelry, and other fashion accessories. The dresses are described as having bows, ruffles, prints, and waist ties, while most blouses have pastel lace and removable collars. The original print fabric and lace are produced in Japan. The prints use "delicate motifs" and "subtle colors." The dresses are produced in one size, but they are designed to fit a variety of body shapes. In addition, despite the "outlandish" and "formal" designs, the dresses are meant for everyday wear and include pockets. Angelic Pretty has several mascots featured in their print designs, their popular ones being Pony, Lyrical Bunny, Shyness Bear, and Little Mouse Julie.

Angelic Pretty has created collaboration dresses with Creamy Mami, the Magic Angel, Macross Frontier, Final Fantasy, and Miffy. They have also collaborated with other fashion brands such as Jenny Fax.

== Stores ==
Angelic Pretty's flagship store is located in the department store Laforet in the Harajuku neighborhood of Tokyo. Other locations in Japan include Shinjuku (Tokyo), Shibuya (Tokyo), Osaka, Nagoya, Sendai, Utsunomiya, Hiroshima, Yokohama, Kanazawa, Fukuoka, Okayama, and Sannomiya.

=== Overseas locations ===
From 2009 to August 2013, Angelic Pretty partnered with French retailer Boddywood to distribute their products in Paris, France. Following the end of their partnership, in 2016, Angelic Pretty opened a store in Paris.

On November 20, 2010, Angelic Pretty opened a store in San Francisco, California, in the United States, as a combination store with lolita fashion retailer Harajuku Hearts. On October 17, 2012, they opened a store in Shanghai, China. On January 18, 2020, a second store was opened in Chengdu, China.

== Marketing ==
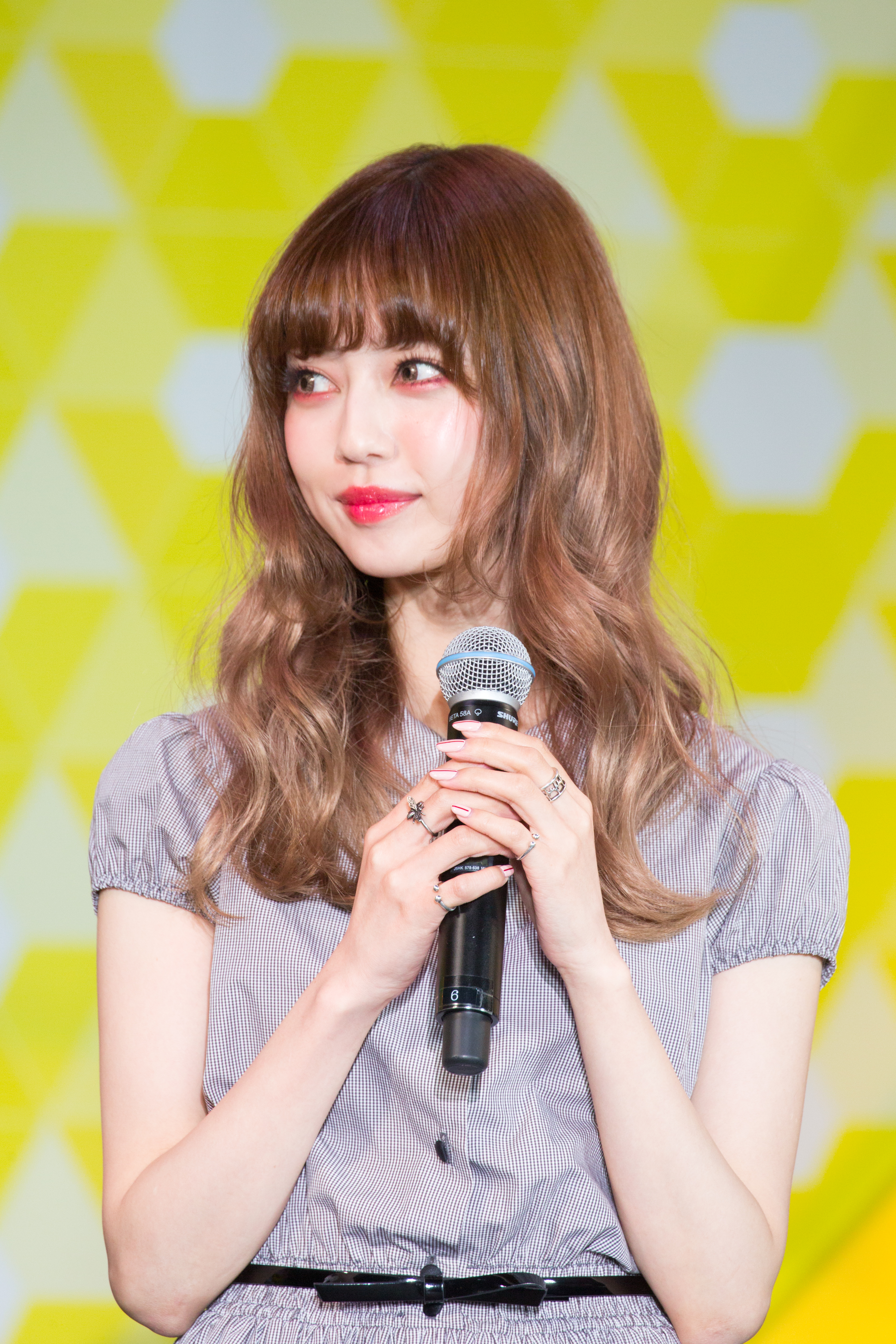
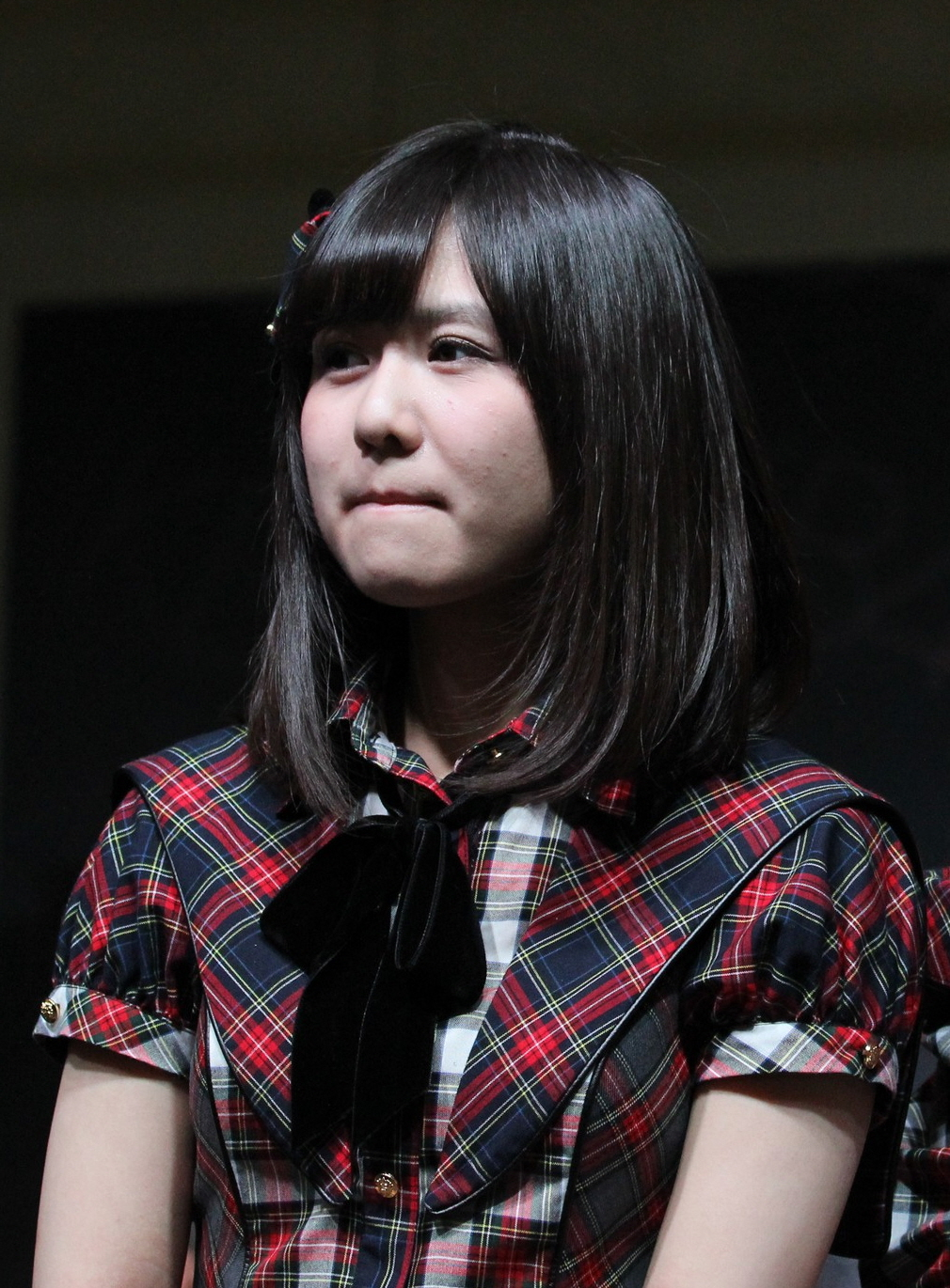
Risa Nakamura (left, pictured in 2017) is Angelic Pretty's current image model. Sumire Satō (right, pictured in 2013) was Angelic Pretty's previous image model.

Angelic Pretty holds tea party events every year in Tokyo that include fashion shows previewing their seasonal collections. Angelic Pretty also holds tea party events at overseas anime conventions and Japanese culture events, such as Anime Revolution and Japan Expo. In addition, Angelic Pretty has been featured in lolita fashion shows held by anime conventions, such as Sakura-Con, Northwest Fan Fest. The brand has also made appearances at various overseas Japanese fashion events including Yumemiru Musical Paradise and Fantaisies dans le Monde des Rêves.

Angelic Pretty's current image model is Risa Nakamura. Previously, AKB48 and SKE48 member Sumire Satō was Angelic Pretty's image model in 2012. Other people who had modeled for Angelic Pretty included Sayaka Kanda, Denpagumi.inc member Risa Aizawa, and RinRin Doll.

Angelic Pretty produced the wardrobe for the main character of the 2011 television drama adaptation of Deka Wanko. They also produced the wardrobe for Fumi Nikaido's character in the 2013 film adapatation of Shijūkyū-nichi no Recipe and Sumire Satō's character in the 2016 film adaptation of the manga The Little Match Girl.
