= Pacific Media Expo =

Multi-genre convention in California, United States

Coordinates: 34°4′49″N 118°5′48″W

- Pacific Media Expo logo
- Status: Active
- Genre: Asian-Pacific Media, Popular Culture
- Venue: Sheraton Los Angeles San Gabriel
- Location: San Gabriel, California
- Country: United States
- Inaugurated: 2004
- Organizer: Pacific Media Association (PMA)
- Website: http://www.pacificmediaexpo.org/

The Pacific Media Expo (PMX) is an annual three day multi-genre convention held during October/November at the Sheraton Los Angeles San Gabriel in San Gabriel, California. PMX was created in 2003 by Mike Tatsugawa, founder of Anime Expo. Pacific Media Association, the parent of Pacific Media Expo is based in Los Angeles, California.

== Programming ==
The convention typically offers art exhibitions, artists market, anime music video contest, anime video rooms, autograph sessions, concerts, live performances, exhibit hall, fashion show, gaming tournaments, iron cosplay, masquerade, panel discussions, swap meets, video rooms (animation, Asian cinema, and Korean drama), and workshops.

== History ==
PMX was formed by staff members from several conventions and former staff of Anime Expo after several years of planning and research. The convention was created as a for-profit event due to concerns over the restraints of non-profit status. Miyavi cancelled his appearance at Pacific Media Expo in 2004 due to the lack of an engineer and the convention offered a registration refund. Silver Ash was unable to attend due performer visa backlogs.

Several issues affected the success of the 2004 convention, including the concerts being on a separate day (28th) from the convention (29th-31st), and the concerts and convention having separate tickets. The convention utilized the same space as Anime Expo. Potential attendance was overestimated, as PMX prepared for 10,000, but only had 3,000. Concert turnout was considered a success, but only an estimated 25% attended the convention afterwards. Also complicating the event was the Memorial Day weekend with graduations, proms, and FanimeCon. The convention for 2005 moved to Labor Day with adjustments made to the space required.

Pacific Media Expo did not occur in 2017 due to schedule conflicts with NCAA football and the convention's traditional November date. Pacific Media Expo 2020 was a virtual convention due to the COVID-19 pandemic.

=== Event history ===
Dates	Location	Atten.	Guests
May 29–31, 2004	Anaheim Hilton & Towers; Anaheim Convention Center; Anaheim, California	3,000 (est)	Daisuke Moriyama, Yasuhiro Nightow, Psycho Le Cému, Secret Secret, T.M.Revolution, Nami Tamaki, and Takahiro Yoshimatsu.
September 3–5, 2005	Long Beach Convention Center; Long Beach, California		Masaki Asai (APSY), Kumiko Kato, Naoko Matsui, Seiji Mizushima, Daisuke Moriyama, Rex Navarrete, Koichi Ohata, and Random Ninjas.
October 28–29, 2006	Hilton Los Angeles Airport; Los Angeles, California		Michael Dante DiMartino, Bryan Konietzko, Olivia Lufkin, Mechanical Panda, Novala Takemoto, UchuSentai:Noiz, and Random Ninjas.
November 9–11, 2007	Hilton Los Angeles Airport; Los Angeles, California		Tomo Asaha, Asuka, The Candy Spooky Theater, Head Phones President, James Kyson Lee, LiN Clover, Maki, Yukana Nogami, The Slants, Spike Spencer, Hiroyuki Tanaka, Thee Out Mods, Takahiro Umehara, Cristina Vee, Collin Chou, and D&L.
November 7–9, 2008	Hilton Los Angeles Airport; Los Angeles, California		Kaya and Suicide Ali.
November 6–8, 2009	Hilton Los Angeles Airport; Los Angeles, California		Takuya Angel, Asuka, Gashicon, Aoi Kidokoro, Maki, UchuSentai:Noiz, Cristina Vee, Shinichi Watanabe.
November 12–14, 2010	Hilton Pasadena; Pasadena, California		Dig Jelly, Hiromi Kato, Lemon Drop Kick, Amy Okuda, Stephanie Sheh, and Tanuki Suit Riot.
November 11–13, 2011	Hilton Los Angeles Airport; Los Angeles, California		Yuko Ashizawa, Suzumi Atsushi, Petrea Burchard, Steve Cardenas, Alexandra Bokyun Chun, D, Dig Jelly, Richard Epcar, Rebecca Forstadt, Ellen Gerstell, Yasuhiro Imagawa, Walter E. Jones, Takayuki Karahashi, C.S. Lee, Lemon Drop Kick, Cyril Lumboy, Sherry Lynn, Matthew Mercer, Tsuyoshi Nonaka, Stephanie Sheh, George Takei, Cristina Vee, and Steve Yun.
November 9–11, 2012	Hilton Los Angeles Airport; Los Angeles, California		Dante Basco, Bea Billany, Christine Marie Cabanos, Hector David, Jr., Najee De-Tiege, Alex Heartman, Masumi Kano, Lauren Landa, Lolita Dark, Cyril Lumboy, Danielle McRae, Hatsune Miku, Marin M. Miller, Moon Stream, Tsuyoshi Nonaka, Psycho Bando, Steven Skyler, Ryan Stylez, Cristina Vee, Sarah Anne Williams, Stephanie Yanez, Mamoru Yokota, and Z8 (Z-Ann).
November 8–10, 2013	Hilton Los Angeles Airport; Los Angeles, California		Back-On, Bea Billany, Lucien Dodge, Erik Scott Kimerer, Izumi Matsumoto, Erica Mendez, Hatsune Miku, Marin M. Miller, Mari Nakamura, and Michael Sinterniklaas.
November 7–9, 2014	Hilton Los Angeles Airport; Los Angeles, California		Yumi Fujiwara, heidi., Hiromi Matsushita, and Kazuko Tadano.
September 5–7, 2015	Pasadena Convention Center; Pasadena, California		Kyoko Hikami, Hatsune Miku, Femme Fatale, Kira Imai, Lorina Liddell, and Jin (behindinfinity).
November 11–13, 2016	Pasadena Convention Center; Pasadena, California		Valerie Arem, Corina Boettger, Hitomi, R. Martin Klein, Masashi Kudo, Wendee Lee, Mari Nakamura, Joe Ochman, Octopimp, Kiff VandenHeuvel, Ezra Weisz, Stephanie Yanez, and Mamoru Yokota.
October 27-28, 2018	Hilton Los Angeles North/Glendale & Executive Meeting Center; Glendale, California		Jon Allen, haru, Lauren Mary Kim, Tara Sands, Paul St. Peter, and Stephanie Yanez.
November 9-10, 2019	Hilton Los Angeles North/Glendale & Executive Meeting Center; Glendale, California		
November 21-22, 2020	Online convention		
October 21-23, 2022	Sheraton Los Angeles San Gabriel; San Gabriel, California		Mary Claypool, Les E. Claypool III, Kazha, Risa Mei, Mooncake, Suncake, and Takeryia Samurai.

== See also ==
- Anime Expo
- List of multigenre conventions
