= Mike Tatsugawa =

American businessman

Mike Tatsugawa (born 1968) is a Japanese-American CEO of Pacific Media Association, the parent organization which produces Pacific Media Expo (PMX).

He was one of the four founders of Cal-Animage Alpha (CAA) at the University of California, Berkeley in 1989. Tatsugawa was the chairman of AnimeCon in 1991, the event that later evolved into Anime Expo. In 1992 he founded Anime Expo and the Society for the Promotion of Japanese Animation (SPJA), the non-profit behind the convention where he was CEO. He chaired his last Anime Expo in 2000. While CEO of SPJA, Anime Expo added another event in New York City.

In 2003, Tatsugawa voiced concerns over SPJA's finances and staff conflicts of interest. SPJA strongly denied these claims and retained attorneys. Tatsugawa resigned from Anime Expo in 2004 and founded Pacific Media Expo, the first large North American Asian-Pacific pop culture convention.
