= Rhetoric =

Art of persuasion

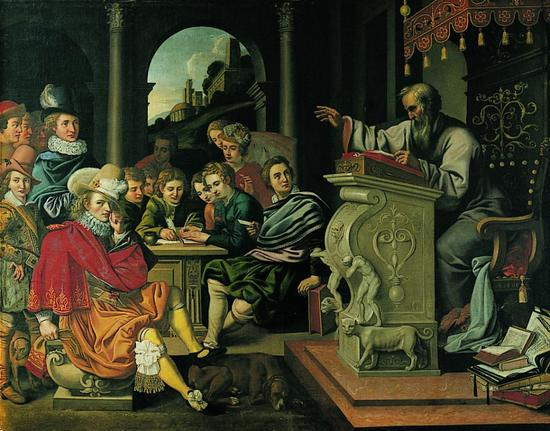
Painting depicting a lecture in a knight academy, painted by Pieter Isaacsz or Reinhold Timm for Rosenborg Castle as part of a series of seven paintings depicting the seven independent arts. This painting illustrates rhetoric.

Rhetoric (Note: Pronounced /ˈrɛtərɪk/. Its adjective form, rhetorical, is pronounced /rɪˈtɒrɪkəl/.) (Note: The word rhetoric comes from the Ancient Greek ῥητορικός rhētorikós, "oratorical", from ῥήτωρ rhḗtōr, "public speaker".) is the art of persuasion. It is one of the three ancient arts of discourse (trivium) of classical antiquity, along with grammar and logic/dialectic. As an academic discipline within the humanities, rhetoric aims to study the techniques that speakers or writers use to inform, persuade, and motivate their audiences. Rhetoric also provides heuristics for understanding, discovering, and developing arguments for particular situations.

Aristotle defined rhetoric as "the faculty of observing in any given case the available means of persuasion", and since mastery of the art was necessary for victory in a case at law, for passage of proposals in the assembly, or for fame as a speaker in civic ceremonies, he called it "a combination of the science of logic and of the ethical branch of politics". Aristotle also identified three persuasive audience appeals: logos, pathos, and ethos. The five canons of rhetoric, or phases of developing a persuasive speech, were first codified in classical Rome: inventio (invention), dispositio (arrangement), elocutio (style), memoria (memory), and pronuntiatio (delivery).

The definition of rhetoric has undergone several transformations throughout history, each reflecting the perspectives of their respective period. In Ancient Greece and Ancient Rome, it was largely viewed as an art of persuasion, and an important part of civic life. Later, during the Enlightenment, rhetoric became increasingly connected to the study of language and reasoning. John Locke criticized its deceptive potential, while George Campbell lauded its ability to do more than persuade, but to inform, engage, and influence. In the modern era, the definition has expanded beyond public speaking to include broader forms of human communication. Scholars such as Kenneth Burke and Andrea Lunsford emphasized the role of symbols, while Lloyd Bitzer focused on the relationship between rhetoric and the situation in which is it used. Ultimately, rhetoric has evolved to include a wide range of how people communicate and shape meaning, from traditional speech to modern digital media.

From Ancient Greece to the late 19th century, rhetoric played a central role in Western education and Islamic education in training orators, lawyers, counsellors, historians, statesmen, politicians, and poets. (Note: The definition of rhetoric is a controversial subject in the field and has given rise to philological battles over its meaning in Ancient Greece.)

== Uses ==
=== Scope ===
Scholars have debated the scope of rhetoric since ancient times. Although some have limited rhetoric to the specific realm of political discourse, to many modern scholars it encompasses every aspect of culture. Contemporary studies of rhetoric address a much more diverse range of domains than was the case in ancient times. While classical rhetoric trained speakers to be effective persuaders in public forums and in institutions such as courtrooms and assemblies, contemporary rhetoric investigates human discourse writ large. Rhetoricians have studied the discourses of a wide variety of domains, including the natural and social sciences, fine art, religion, journalism, digital media, fiction, history, cartography, and architecture, along with the more traditional domains of politics and the law.

Because the ancient Greeks valued public political participation, rhetoric emerged as an important curriculum for those desiring to influence politics. Rhetoric is still associated with its political origins. However, even the original instructors of Western speech—the Sophists—disputed this limited view of rhetoric. According to Sophists like Gorgias, a successful rhetorician could speak convincingly on a topic in any field, regardless of their experience in that field. This suggested rhetoric could be a means of communicating any expertise, not just politics. In his Encomium to Helen, Gorgias even applied rhetoric to fiction by seeking, for his amusement, to prove the blamelessness of the mythical Helen of Troy in starting the Trojan War.

Plato defined the scope of rhetoric by discarding any connotation of religious ritual or magical incantation. He takes the term for the persuasion achieved by rhetoric, psychagogia, in its literal sense, "leading the soul" through words. He criticized the Sophists for using rhetoric to deceive rather than to discover truth. In Gorgias, one of his Socratic Dialogues, Plato defines rhetoric as the persuasion of ignorant masses within the courts and assemblies. Rhetoric, in Plato's opinion, is merely a form of flattery and functions similarly to culinary arts, which mask the undesirability of unhealthy food by making it taste good. Plato considered any speech of lengthy prose aimed at flattery as within the scope of rhetoric. Some scholars, however, contest the idea that Plato despised rhetoric and instead view his dialogues as a dramatization of complex rhetorical principles. Socrates explained the relationship between rhetoric in flattery when he maintained that a rhetorician who teaches anyone how to persuade people in an assembly to do what they want, without knowledge of what is just or unjust, engages in a kind of flattery (kolakeia) that constitutes an image (eidolon) of a part of the art of politics.

Aristotle both redeemed rhetoric from Plato and narrowed its focus by defining three genres of rhetoric—deliberative, forensic or judicial, and epideictic. Yet, even as he provided order to existing rhetorical theories, Aristotle generalized the definition of rhetoric to be the ability to identify the appropriate means of persuasion in a given situation based upon the art of rhetoric (technê). This made rhetoric applicable to all fields, not just politics. Aristotle viewed the enthymeme based upon logic (especially, based upon the syllogism) as the basis of rhetoric.

Aristotle also outlined generic constraints that focused the rhetorical art squarely within the domain of public political practice. He restricted rhetoric to the domain of the contingent or probable: those matters that admit multiple legitimate opinions or arguments.

Since the time of Aristotle, logic has changed. For example, modal logic has undergone a major development that also modifies rhetoric.

The contemporary neo-Aristotelian and neo-Sophistic positions on rhetoric mirror the division between the Sophists and Aristotle. Neo-Aristotelians generally study rhetoric as political discourse, while the neo-Sophistic view contends that rhetoric cannot be so limited. Rhetorical scholar Michael Leff characterizes the conflict between these positions as viewing rhetoric as a "thing contained" versus a "container". The neo-Aristotelian view threatens the study of rhetoric by restraining it to such a limited field, ignoring many critical applications of rhetorical theory, criticism, and practice. Simultaneously, the neo-Sophists threaten to expand rhetoric beyond a point of coherent theoretical value.

In more recent years, people studying rhetoric have tended to enlarge its object domain beyond speech. Kenneth Burke asserted humans use rhetoric to resolve conflicts by identifying shared characteristics and interests in symbols. People engage in identification, either to assign themselves or another to a group. This definition of rhetoric as identification broadens the scope from strategic and overt political persuasion to the more implicit tactics of identification found in an immense range of sources. Burke focused on the interplay of identification and division, maintaining that identification compensates for an original division by preventing a strict separation between objects, people, and spaces. This is achieved by assigning to them common properties through linguistic symbols.

Among the many scholars who have since pursued Burke's line of thought, James Boyd White sees rhetoric as a broader domain of social experience in his notion of constitutive rhetoric. Influenced by theories of social construction, White argues that culture is "reconstituted" through language. Just as language influences people, people influence language. Language is socially constructed, and depends on the meanings people attach to it. Because language is not rigid and changes depending on the situation, the very usage of language is rhetorical. An author, White would say, is always trying to construct a new world and persuading his or her readers to share that world within the text.

People engage in rhetoric any time they speak or produce meaning. Even in the field of science, via practices which were once viewed as being merely the objective testing and reporting of knowledge, scientists persuade their audience to accept their findings by sufficiently demonstrating that their study or experiment was conducted reliably and resulted in sufficient evidence to support their conclusions.

The vast scope of rhetoric is difficult to define. Political discourse remains the paradigmatic example for studying and theorizing specific techniques and conceptions of persuasion or rhetoric. Colloquially, the term has also come to mean a particular style of language usage, often with connotations of public and exaggerated speech.

=== As a civic art ===
Throughout European History, rhetoric meant persuasion in public and political settings such as assemblies and courts. Because of its associations with democratic institutions, rhetoric is commonly said to flourish in open and democratic societies with rights of free speech, free assembly, and political enfranchisement for some portion of the population. Those who classify rhetoric as a civic art believe that rhetoric has the power to shape communities, form the character of citizens, and greatly affect civic life.

Rhetoric was viewed as a civic art by several of the ancient philosophers. Aristotle and Isocrates were two of the first to see rhetoric in this light. In Antidosis, Isocrates states, "We have come together and founded cities and made laws and invented arts; and, generally speaking, there is no institution devised by man which the power of speech has not helped us to establish." With this statement he argues that rhetoric is a fundamental part of civic life in every society and that it has been necessary in the foundation of all aspects of society. He further argues in Against the Sophists that rhetoric, although it cannot be taught to just anyone, is capable of shaping the character of man. He writes, "I do think that the study of political discourse can help more than any other thing to stimulate and form such qualities of character." Aristotle, writing several years after Isocrates, supported many of his arguments and argued for rhetoric as a civic art.

In the words of Aristotle, in the Rhetoric, rhetoric is "...the faculty of observing in any given case the available means of persuasion". According to Aristotle, this art of persuasion could be used in public settings in three different ways: "A member of the assembly decides about future events, a juryman about past events: while those who merely decide on the orator's skill are observers. From this it follows that there are three divisions of oratory—(1) political, (2) forensic, and (3) the ceremonial oratory of display". Eugene Garver, in his critique of Aristotle's Rhetoric, confirms that Aristotle viewed rhetoric as a civic art. Garver writes, "Rhetoric articulates a civic art of rhetoric, combining the almost incompatible properties of techne and appropriateness to citizens." Each of Aristotle's divisions plays a role in civic life and can be used in a different way to affect the polis.

Because rhetoric is a public art capable of shaping opinion, some of the ancients, including Plato found fault in it. They claimed that while it could be used to improve civic life, it could be used just as easily to deceive or manipulate. The masses were incapable of analyzing or deciding anything on their own and would therefore be swayed by the most persuasive speeches. Thus, civic life could be controlled by whoever could deliver the best speech. Plato explores the problematic moral status of rhetoric twice: in Gorgias and in The Phaedrus, a dialogue best-known for its commentary on love.

More trusting in the power of rhetoric to support a republic, the Roman orator Cicero argued that art required something more than eloquence. A good orator needed also to be a good person, enlightened on a variety of civic topics. In De Oratore, modeled on Plato's dialogues, Cicero emphasized that effective rhetoric comes from a combination of wisdom (sapientia) and eloquence (eloquentia). According to Cicero, the ideal orator must demonstrate not only stylistic skill but also moral integrity and broad learning, thus uniting theory and practice for the betterment of the state. Influenced by Aristotelian ideas, Cicero advanced the tradition by systematizing the five canons of rhetoric—inventio (invention), dispositio (arrangement), elocutio (style), memoria (memory), and pronuntiatio (delivery)—which he saw as key to crafting persuasive discourse. In this view, a well-trained orator, who draws from philosophy, law, and other disciplines, is best able to address civic and ethical challenges, thus underscoring Cicero's vision of rhetoric as both an intellectual and ethical pursuit.

Modern works continue to support the claims of the ancients that rhetoric is an art capable of influencing civic life. In Political Style, Robert Hariman claims that "questions of freedom, equality, and justice often are raised and addressed through performances ranging from debates to demonstrations without loss of moral content". James Boyd White argues that rhetoric is capable not only of addressing issues of political interest but that it can influence culture as a whole. In his book, When Words Lose Their Meaning, he argues that words of persuasion and identification define community and civic life. He states that words produce "the methods by which culture is maintained, criticized, and transformed".

Rhetoric remains relevant as a civic art. In speeches, as well as in non-verbal forms, rhetoric continues to be used as a tool to influence communities from local to national levels.

=== As a political tool ===
Political parties sometimes employ "manipulative rhetoric" to advance their party-line goals and lobbyist agendas. They use it to portray themselves as champions of compassion, freedom, and culture, all while implementing policies that appear to contradict these claims. It serves as a form of political propaganda, presented to sway and maintain public opinion in their favor, and garner a positive image, potentially at the expense of suppressing dissent or criticism. An example of this is the government's actions in freezing bank accounts and regulating internet speech, ostensibly to protect the vulnerable and preserve freedom of expression, despite contradicting values and rights.

Going back to the fifth century BCE, the term rhetoric originated in Ancient Greece. During this period, a new government (democracy) had been formed and as speech was the main method of information, an effective communication strategy was needed. Sophists, a group of intellectuals from Sicily, taught the ancient Greeks the art of persuasive speech in order to be able to navigate themselves in the court and senate. This new technique was then used as an effective method of speech in political speeches and throughout government. Consequently people began to fear that persuasive speech would overpower truth. However, Aristotle argued that speech can be used to classify, study, and interpret speeches and as a useful skill. Aristotle believed that this technique was an art, and that persuasive speech could have truth and logic embedded within it. In the end, rhetoric speech still remained popular and was used by many scholars and philosophers.

=== As a course of study ===
The study of rhetoric trains students to speak and/or write effectively, and to critically understand and analyze discourse. It is concerned with how people use symbols, especially language, to reach agreement that permits coordinated effort.

Rhetoric as a course of study has evolved since its ancient beginnings, and has adapted to the particular exigencies of various times, venues, and applications ranging from architecture to literature. Although the curriculum has transformed in a number of ways, it has generally emphasized the study of principles and rules of composition as a means for moving audiences.

Rhetoric began as a civic art in Ancient Greece where students were trained to develop tactics of oratorical persuasion, especially in legal disputes. Rhetoric originated in a school of pre-Socratic philosophers known as the Sophists c. 600 BCE. Demosthenes and Lysias emerged as major orators during this period, and Isocrates and Gorgias as prominent teachers. Modern teachings continue to reference these rhetoricians and their work in discussions of classical rhetoric and persuasion.

Rhetoric was taught in universities during the Middle Ages as one of the three original liberal arts or trivium (along with logic and grammar). During the medieval period, political rhetoric declined as republican oratory died out and the emperors of Rome garnered increasing authority. With the rise of European monarchs, rhetoric shifted into courtly and religious applications. Augustine exerted strong influence on Christian rhetoric in the Middle Ages, advocating the use of rhetoric to lead audiences to truth and understanding, especially in the church. The study of liberal arts, he believed, contributed to rhetorical study: "In the case of a keen and ardent nature, fine words will come more readily through reading and hearing the eloquent than by pursuing the rules of rhetoric." Poetry and letter writing became central to rhetorical study during the Middle Ages. After the fall of the Roman republic, poetry became a tool for rhetorical training since there were fewer opportunities for political speech. Letter writing was the primary way business was conducted both in state and church, so it became an important aspect of rhetorical education.

Rhetorical education became more restrained as style and substance separated in 16th-century France, and attention turned to the scientific method. Influential scholars like Peter Ramus argued that the processes of invention and arrangement should be elevated to the domain of philosophy, while rhetorical instruction should be chiefly concerned with the use of figures and other forms of the ornamentation of language. Scholars such as Francis Bacon developed the study of "scientific rhetoric" which rejected the elaborate style characteristic of classical oration. This plain language carried over to John Locke's teaching, which emphasized concrete knowledge and steered away from ornamentation in speech, further alienating rhetorical instruction—which was identified wholly with such ornamentation—from the pursuit of knowledge.

In the 18th century, rhetoric assumed a more social role, leading to the creation of new education systems (predominantly in England): "Elocution schools" in which girls and women analyzed classic literature, most notably the works of William Shakespeare, and discussed pronunciation tactics.

The study of rhetoric underwent a revival with the rise of democratic institutions during the late 18th and early 19th centuries. Hugh Blair was a key early leader of this movement. In his most famous work, Lectures on Rhetoric and Belles Lettres, he advocates rhetorical study for common citizens as a resource for social success. Many American colleges and secondary schools used Blair's text throughout the 19th century to train students of rhetoric.

Political rhetoric also underwent renewal in the wake of the U.S. and French revolutions. The rhetorical studies of ancient Greece and Rome were resurrected as speakers and teachers looked to Cicero and others to inspire defenses of the new republics. Leading rhetorical theorists included John Quincy Adams of Harvard, who advocated the democratic advancement of rhetorical art. Harvard's founding of the Boylston Professorship of Rhetoric and Oratory sparked the growth of the study of rhetoric in colleges across the United States. Harvard's rhetoric program drew inspiration from literary sources to guide organization and style, and studies the rhetoric used in political communication to illustrate how political figures persuade audiences. William G. Allen became the first American college professor of rhetoric, at New-York Central College, 1850–1853.

19th century changes in the rhetoric and composition pedagogy included more focus on the student's developing skill through composition. Rhetoric professors like A. S. Hill, Barrett Wendell and John Franklin Genung were prominent authors in the late 19th and early 20th centuries.

Debate clubs and lyceums also developed as forums in which common citizens could hear speakers and sharpen debate skills. The American lyceum in particular was seen as both an educational and social institution, featuring group discussions and guest lecturers. These programs cultivated democratic values and promoted active participation in political analysis.

Throughout the 20th century, rhetoric developed as a concentrated field of study, with the establishment of rhetorical courses in high schools and universities. Courses such as public speaking and speech analysis apply fundamental Greek theories (such as the modes of persuasion: ethos, pathos, and logos) and trace rhetorical development through history. Rhetoric earned a more esteemed reputation as a field of study with the emergence of Communication Studies departments and of Rhetoric and Composition programs within English departments in universities, and in conjunction with the linguistic turn in Western philosophy. Rhetorical study has broadened in scope, and is especially used by the fields of marketing, politics, and literature.

The writing classroom, which includes fields of rhetoric and of composition studies, aims to prepare students for participation in public life. A broad understanding of rhetoric is needed to engage meaningfully in society. Scholars, however, have criticized the composition classroom for its inability to develop rhetorical skills in students. Sharon Crowley contends that the current-traditional rhetorical approach, common in many schools today, has oversimplified the writing process, reducing the composition classroom to a "series of exercises wherein students simply demonstrate their mastery of textbook trivia". Many curricula also center on win-oriented argumentation, which can limit the development of critical thinking by encouraging students to defend predetermined positions rather than engage with the complexities of an issue. These criticisms reflect a broader concern that rhetorical education has been neglected in favor of prescriptive instruction. In response, scholars have called for changes to rhetoric and composition pedagogy, including expanding writing programs to incorporate multimodal forms of rhetoric that help students understand forms of rhetorical production outside of written works.

Another area of rhetoric is the study of cultural rhetorics, which is the communication that occurs between cultures and the study of the way members of a culture communicate with each other. These ideas can then be studied and understood by other cultures, in order to bridge gaps in modes of communication and help different cultures communicate effectively with each other. James Zappen defines cultural rhetorics as the idea that rhetoric is concerned with negotiation and listening, not persuasion, which differs from ancient definitions. Some ancient rhetoric was disparaged because its persuasive techniques could be used to teach falsehoods. Communication as studied in cultural rhetorics is focused on listening and negotiation, and has little to do with persuasion. Cultural rhetoric is not a singular definition or any one thing, but instead an approach to rhetoric that highlights the connection of culture and rhetoric. The article "Interfacing Cultural Rhetorics: A History and a Call" argues that culture and rhetoric should not be viewed only individually, as they often overlap. Culture can be studied both as a process and as a context, while rhetoric highlights how these cultural processes and contexts are expressed and negotiated. An important theme from the article is that cultural rhetorics emphasized listening and negotiating. Bacon’s analysis of coming out narratives highlights how rhetorics are not simply for persuasion, but can help create meaning and "write new bodies into existence". Indigenous rhetoricians, including Malea Powell and Angela Haas, emphasize the importance of place, story, and relationships in cultural rhetorics, highlighting their decolonial nature.

==== Canons ====
Rhetorical education focused on five canons. The Five Canons of Rhetoric serve as a guide to creating persuasive messages and arguments:

inventio (invention)
the process that leads to the development and refinement of an argument.
dispositio (disposition, or arrangement)
used to determine how an argument should be organized for greatest effect, usually beginning with the exordium
elocutio (style)
determining how to present the arguments
memoria (memory)
the process of learning and memorizing the speech and persuasive messages
pronuntiatio (presentation) and actio (delivery)
the gestures, pronunciation, tone, and pace used when presenting the persuasive arguments—the Grand Style.

Memory was added much later to the original four canons.

=== Music ===
During the Renaissance rhetoric enjoyed a resurgence, and as a result nearly every author who wrote about music before the Romantic era discussed rhetoric. Christoph Bernhard in the latter half of the century said "...until the art of music has attained such a height in our own day, that it may indeed be compared to a rhetoric, in view of the multitude of figures".

=== Knowledge ===
Epistemology and rhetoric have been compared to one another for decades, but the specifications of their similarities have gone undefined. Since scholar Robert L. Scott stated that, "rhetoric is epistemic," rhetoricians and philosophers alike have struggled to concretely define the expanse of implications these words hold. Those who have identified this inconsistency maintain the idea that Scott's relation is important, but requires further study.

The root of the issue lies in the ambiguous use of the term rhetoric itself, as well as the epistemological terms knowledge, certainty, and truth. Though counterintuitive and vague, Scott's claims are accepted by some academics, but are then used to draw different conclusions. Sonja K. Foss, for example, takes on the view that, "rhetoric creates knowledge," whereas James Herrick writes that rhetoric assists in people's ability to form beliefs, which are defined as knowledge once they become widespread in a community.

It is unclear whether Scott holds that certainty is an inherent part of establishing knowledge, his references to the term abstract. He is not the only one, as the debate's persistence in philosophical circles long predates his addition of rhetoric. There is an overwhelming majority that does support the concept of certainty as a requirement for knowledge, but it is at the definition of certainty where parties begin to diverge. One definition maintains that certainty is subjective and feeling-based, the other that it is a byproduct of justification.

The more commonly accepted definition of rhetoric claims it is synonymous with persuasion. For rhetorical purposes, this definition, like many others, is too broad. One common definition describes rhetoric as the art of persuasion. William D. Harpine (2004) argues that this definition is useful when examining whether rhetoric contributes to knowledge because it is more specific than definitions that include all forms of language or communication.The same issue presents itself with definitions that are too narrow. Rhetoricians in support of the epistemic view of rhetoric have yet to agree in this regard.

Philosophical teachings refer to knowledge as a justified true belief. According to this definition, someone possesses knowledge of something if they believe it, their belief is true, and they have a justified reason to believe it. However, the Gettier Problem explores the room for fallacy in this concept by positing that someone is capable of holding a justified true belief without actually possessing knowledge. Therefore, the Gettier Problem impedes the effectivity of the argument of Richard A. Cherwitz and James A. Hikins, who employ the justified true belief standpoint in their argument for rhetoric as epistemic. Celeste Condit Railsback takes a different approach, drawing from Ray E. McKerrow's system of belief based on validity rather than certainty.

William D. Harpine refers to the issue of unclear definitions that occurs in the theories of "rhetoric is epistemic" in his 2004 article "What Do You Mean, Rhetoric Is Epistemic?". In it, he focuses on uncovering the most appropriate definitions for the terms "rhetoric", "knowledge", and "certainty". According to Harpine, certainty is either objective or subjective. This distinction can be characterized by the examples, "I am certain that two plus two equals four," and "I feel certain that 2 + 2 equals four." The former expresses objective certainty about reality, while the latter describes an individuals subjective feeling of certainty. Although both Scotts and Cherwitz and Hikins theories deal with some form of certainty, Harpine believes that knowledge is not required to be neither objectively nor subjectively certain.

In terms of "rhetoric", Harpine argues that the definition of rhetoric as "the art of persuasion" is the best choice in the context of this theoretical approach of rhetoric as epistemic. He argues that broader definitions of rhetoric make the claim that rhetoric is epistemic self evident rather than a claim that requires examination. Harpine then proceeds to present two methods of approaching the idea of rhetoric as epistemic based on the definitions presented. One centers on Alston's view that one's beliefs are justified if formed by one's normal doxastic while the other focuses on the causal theory of knowledge. Both approaches manage to avoid Gettier's problems and do not rely on unclear conceptions of certainty.

In his 2004 article What Do You Mean, Rhetoric is Epistemic?, William D. Harpine questions whether previous scholars have adequately demonstrated that rhetoric produces knowledge. He criticizes the confusion between objective certainty, which concerns what is actually certain, and subjective certainty, which concerns an individual's feeling of certainty. Harpine also discusses the Gettier problem, which challenges the assumption that a justified true belief necessarily amounts to knowledge. He suggests that rhetorical epistemology could be examined through Alson't theory of doxastic practices or the Causal Theory of Knowing. Ultimately, Harpine argues that Scott's most valuable insight may be ethical rather than epistemological, emphasizing tolerance and openness to differing beliefs.Harpine further suggests that Scott's ethical argument can be supported by recognizing human fallibility, without having to prove that rhetoric itself produces knowledge.

Harpine further suggests that Scott's ethical argument can be supported by recognizing human fallibility, without having to prove that rhetoric itself produces knowledge. He distinguishes rhetoric from dialectic by explaining that rhetoric focuses on persuasion, while dialectic involves investigating arguments through discussion. Although these approaches serve different purposes, both can contribute to how individuals examine their beliefs and respond to uncertainty. Harpine argues that recognizing the limitations of human knowledge can encourage tolerance and reduce dogmatism without requiring a new definition of knowledge.

== History and study ==
=== Ancient times ===
Rhetoric, as persuasion (originally, in speech more than writing) that holds people to a common purpose and therefore facilitates collective action, has its origins in Mesopotamia. Some of the earliest examples of rhetoric can be found in the Akkadian writings of the princess and priestess Enheduanna (c. 2285–2250 BCE). As the first named author in history, Enheduanna's writing exhibits numerous rhetorical features that would later become canon in Ancient Greece. Enheduanna's "The Exaltation of Inanna", includes an exordium, argument, and peroration, as well as elements of ethos, pathos, and logos, and repetition and metonymy. She is also known for describing her process of invention in "The Exaltation of Inanna", moving between first- and third-person address to relate her composing process in collaboration with the goddess Inanna, reflecting a mystical enthymeme in drawing upon a Cosmic audience.

Later examples of early rhetoric can be found in the Neo-Assyrian Empire during the time of Sennacherib (704–681 BCE).

In ancient Egypt, rhetoric had existed since at least the Middle Kingdom period (c. 2080–1640 BCE). The five canons of eloquence in ancient Egyptian rhetoric were silence, timing, restraint, fluency, and truthfulness. The Egyptians held eloquent speaking in high esteem. Egyptian rules of rhetoric specified that "knowing when not to speak is essential, and very respected, rhetorical knowledge", making rhetoric a "balance between eloquence and wise silence". They also emphasized "adherence to social behaviors that support a conservative status quo" and they held that "skilled speech should support, not question, society".

In ancient China, rhetoric dates back to the Chinese philosopher, Confucius (551–479 BCE). The tradition of Confucianism emphasized the use of eloquence in speaking.

The use of rhetoric can also be found in the ancient Biblical tradition.

=== Ancient Greece and Rome ===
Ancient Greece, which was later subsumed under the growing Roman civilization, produced extensive early documented scholarship on rhetoric. Rhetoricians of Classical Greece included the sophists, wandering professional teachers of rhetoric, as well as Isocrates (one of the ten Attic orators), the philosopher Plato, and his student Aristotle. The most famous rhetorician of the Roman Republic was Cicero and of the succeeding Roman Empire was Quintillian. All of these scholars created formalized systems and classifications of rhetorical strategies, devices, or modes. Their work had a massive effect on rhetorical studies of the European Renaissance and, as a result, Western civilization, and are thus considered the direct precursor to modern Western rhetoric, under the broad label classical rhetoric.

=== Ancient India ===
India's Struggle for Independence offers a vivid description of the culture that sprang up around the newspaper in village India of the early 1870s:

A newspaper would reach remote villages and would then be read by a reader to tens of others. Gradually library movements sprung up all over the country. A local 'library' would be organized around a single newspaper. A table, a bench or two or a charpoy would constitute the capital equipment. Every piece of news or editorial comment would be read or heard and thoroughly discussed. The newspaper not only became the political educator; reading or discussing it became a form of political participation.

This reading and discussion was the focal point of origin of the modern Indian rhetorical movement. Much before this, ancients such as Kautilya, Birbal, and the like indulged in a great deal of discussion and persuasion.

Keith Lloyd argued that much of the recital of the Vedas can be likened to the recital of ancient Greek poetry. Lloyd proposed including the Nyāya Sūtras in the field of rhetorical studies, exploring its methods within their historical context, comparing its approach to the traditional logical syllogism, and relating it to modern perspectives of Stephen Toulmin, Kenneth Burke, and Chaim Perelman.

Nyaya is a Sanskrit word which means "just" or "right" and refers to "the science of right and wrong reasoning". Sutra is also a Sanskrit word which means string or thread. Here sutra refers to a collection of aphorism in the form of a manual. Each sutra is a short rule usually consisted of one or two sentences. An example of a sutra is: "Reality is truth, and what is true is so, irrespective of whether we know it is, or are aware of that truth." The Nyāya Sūtras is an ancient Indian Sanskrit text composed by Aksapada Gautama. It is the foundational text of the Nyaya school of Hindu philosophy. It is estimated that the text was composed between 6th-century BCE and 2nd-century CE. The text may have been composed by more than one author, over a period of time. Radhakrishan and Moore placed its origin in the third century BCE "though some of the contents of the Nyaya Sutra are certainly a post-Christian era". The ancient school of Nyaya extended over a period of one thousand years, beginning with Gautama about 550 BCE and ending with Vatsyayana about 400 CE.

Nyaya provides insight into Indian rhetoric. Nyaya presents an argumentative approach with which a rhetor can decide about any argument. In addition, it proposes an approach to thinking about cultural tradition which is different from Western rhetoric. Whereas Toulmin emphasizes the situational dimension of argumentative genre as the fundamental component of any rhetorical logic; Nyaya views this situational rhetoric in a new way which offers context of practical arguments.

Some of India's famous rhetors include Kabir Das, Rahim Das, Chanakya, and Chandragupt Maurya.

=== Medieval period to the Enlightenment ===
After the breakup of the western Roman Empire, the study of rhetoric continued to be central to the study of the verbal arts. However the study of the verbal arts went into decline for several centuries, followed eventually by a gradual rise in formal education, culminating in the rise of medieval universities. Rhetoric transmuted during this period into the arts of letter writing (ars dictaminis) and sermon writing (ars praedicandi). As part of the trivium, rhetoric was secondary to the study of logic, and its study was highly scholastic: students were given repetitive exercises in the creation of discourses on historical subjects (suasoriae) or on classic legal questions (controversiae).

Although he is not commonly regarded as a rhetorician, St. Augustine (354–430) was trained in rhetoric and was at one time a professor of Latin rhetoric in Milan. After his conversion to Christianity, he became interested in using these "pagan" arts for spreading his religion. He explores this new use of rhetoric in De doctrina Christiana, which laid the foundation of what would become homiletics, the rhetoric of the sermon. Augustine asks why "the power of eloquence, which is so efficacious in pleading either for the erroneous cause or the right", should not be used for righteous purposes.

One early concern of the medieval Christian church was its attitude to classical rhetoric itself. Jerome (d. 420) complained, "What has Horace to do with the Psalms, Virgil with the Gospels, Cicero with the Apostles?" Augustine is also remembered for arguing for the preservation of pagan works and fostering a church tradition that led to conservation of numerous pre-Christian rhetorical writings.

Rhetoric would not regain its classical heights until the Renaissance, but new writings did advance rhetorical thought. Boethius (c. 480–524), in his brief Overview of the Structure of Rhetoric, continues Aristotle's taxonomy by placing rhetoric in subordination to philosophical argument or dialectic. The introduction of Arab scholarship from European relations with the Muslim empire (in particular Al-Andalus) renewed interest in Aristotle and Classical thought in general, leading to what some historians call the 12th century Renaissance. A number of medieval grammars and studies of poetry and rhetoric appeared.

Late medieval rhetorical writings include those of St. Thomas Aquinas (c. 1225–1274), Matthew of Vendôme (Ars Versificatoria, c. 1175), and Geoffrey of Vinsauf (Poetria Nova, 1200–1216). Pre-modern female rhetoricians, outside of Socrates' friend Aspasia, are rare; but medieval rhetoric produced by women either in religious orders, such as Julian of Norwich (d. 1415), or the very well-connected Christine de Pizan (c. 1364–c. 1430), did occur although it was not always recorded in writing.

In his 1943 Cambridge University doctoral dissertation in English, Canadian Marshall McLuhan (1911–1980) surveys the verbal arts from approximately the time of Cicero down to the time of Thomas Nashe (1567–c. 1600). His dissertation is still noteworthy for undertaking to study the history of the verbal arts together as the trivium, even though the developments that he surveys have been studied in greater detail since he undertook his study. As noted below, McLuhan became one of the most widely publicized communication theorists of the 20th century.

Another interesting record of medieval rhetorical thought can be seen in the many animal debate poems popular in England and the continent during the Middle Ages, such as The Owl and the Nightingale (13th century) and Geoffrey Chaucer's Parliament of Fowls.

=== Sixteenth century ===
Renaissance humanism defined itself broadly as disfavoring medieval scholastic logic and dialectic and as favoring instead the study of classical Latin style and grammar and philology and rhetoric.

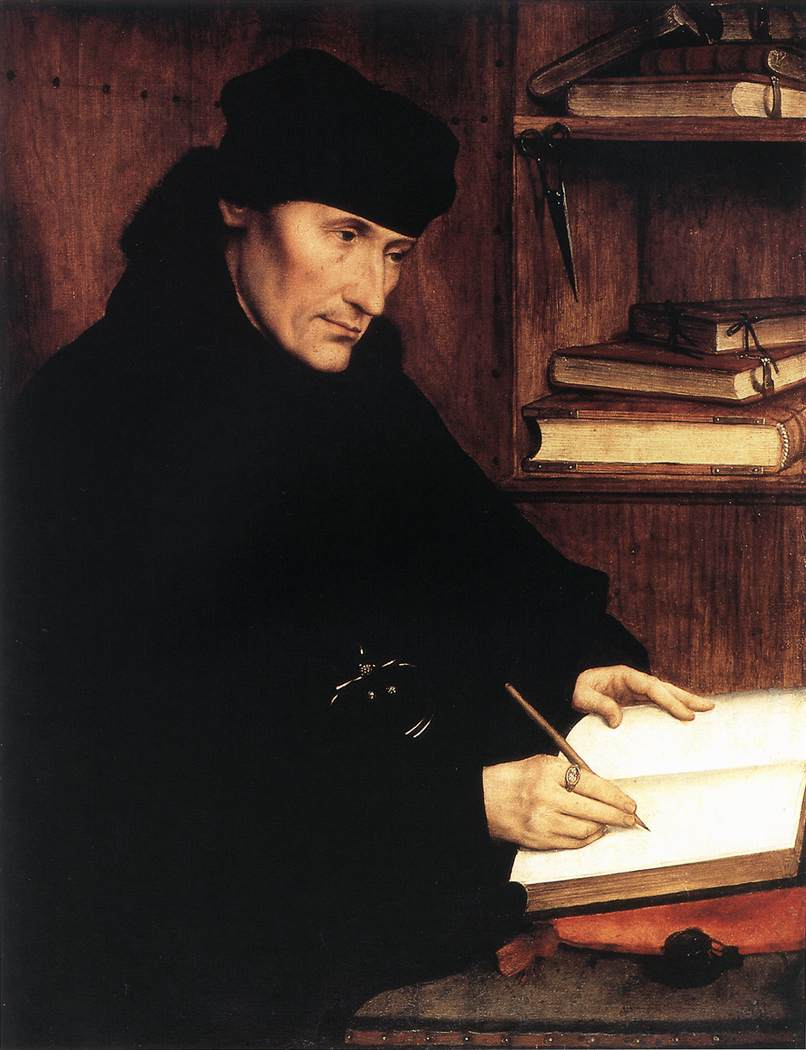
Portrait of Erasmus of Rotterdam

One influential figure in the rebirth of interest in classical rhetoric was Erasmus (c. 1466–1536). His 1512 work, De Duplici Copia Verborum et Rerum (also known as Copia: Foundations of the Abundant Style), was widely published (it went through more than 150 editions throughout Europe) and became one of the basic school texts on the subject. Its treatment of rhetoric is less comprehensive than the classic works of antiquity, but provides a traditional treatment of res-verba (matter and form). Its first book treats the subject of elocutio, showing the student how to use schemes and tropes; the second book covers inventio. Much of the emphasis is on abundance of variation (copia means "plenty" or "abundance", as in copious or cornucopia), so both books focus on ways to introduce the maximum amount of variety into discourse. For instance, in one section of the De Copia, Erasmus presents 195 variations of the sentence "Your letter pleased me greatly" [Tuae litterae me magnopere delectarunt]. Another of his works, the extremely popular The Praise of Folly, also had considerable influence on the teaching of rhetoric in the later 16th century. Its orations in favour of qualities such as madness spawned a type of exercise popular in Elizabethan grammar schools, later called adoxography, which required pupils to compose passages in praise of useless things.

Juan Luis Vives (1492–1540) also helped shape the study of rhetoric in England. A Spaniard, he was appointed in 1523 to the Lectureship of Rhetoric at Oxford by Cardinal Wolsey, and was entrusted by Henry VIII to be one of the tutors of Mary. Vives fell into disfavor when Henry VIII divorced Catherine of Aragon and left England in 1528. His best-known work was a book on education, De Disciplinis, published in 1531, and his writings on rhetoric included Rhetoricae, sive De Ratione Dicendi, Libri Tres (1533), De Consultatione (1533), and a treatise on letter writing, De Conscribendis Epistolas (1536).

It is likely that many well-known English writers were exposed to the works of Erasmus and Vives (as well as those of the Classical rhetoricians) in their schooling, which was conducted in Latin (not English), often included some study of Greek, and placed considerable emphasis on rhetoric.

The mid-16th century saw the rise of vernacular rhetorics—those written in English rather than in the Classical languages. Adoption of works in English was slow, however, due to the strong scholastic orientation toward Latin and Greek. Leonard Cox's The Art or Crafte of Rhetoryke (c. 1524–1530; second edition published in 1532) is the earliest text on rhetorics in English; it was, for the most part, a translation of the work of Philipp Melanchthon. Thomas Wilson's The Arte of Rhetorique (1553) presents a traditional treatment of rhetoric, for instance, the standard five canons of rhetoric. Other notable works included Angel Day's The English Secretorie (1586, 1592), George Puttenham's The Arte of English Poesie (1589), and Richard Rainholde's Foundacion of Rhetorike (1563).

During this same period, a movement began that would change the organization of the school curriculum in Protestant and especially Puritan circles and that led to rhetoric losing its central place. A French scholar, Petrus Ramus (1515–1572), dissatisfied with what he saw as the overly broad and redundant organization of the trivium, proposed a new curriculum. In his scheme of things, the five components of rhetoric no longer lived under the common heading of rhetoric. Instead, invention and disposition were determined to fall exclusively under the heading of dialectic, while style, delivery, and memory were all that remained for rhetoric. Ramus was martyred during the French Wars of Religion. His teachings, seen as inimical to Catholicism, were short-lived in France but found a fertile ground in the Netherlands, Germany, and England.

One of Ramus' French followers, Audomarus Talaeus (Omer Talon) published his rhetoric, Institutiones Oratoriae, in 1544. This work emphasized style, and became so popular that it was mentioned in John Brinsley's (1612) Ludus literarius; or The Grammar Schoole as being the "most used in the best schooles". Many other Ramist rhetorics followed in the next half-century, and by the 17th century, their approach became the primary method of teaching rhetoric in Protestant and especially Puritan circles. John Milton (1608–1674) wrote a textbook in logic or dialectic in Latin based on Ramus' work.

Ramism could not exert any influence on the established Catholic schools and universities, which remained loyal to Scholasticism, or on the new Catholic schools and universities founded by members of the Society of Jesus or the Oratorians, as can be seen in the Jesuit curriculum (in use up to the 19th century across the Christian world) known as the Ratio Studiorum. If the influence of Cicero and Quintilian permeates the Ratio Studiorum, it is through the lenses of devotion and the militancy of the Counter-Reformation. The Ratio was indeed imbued with a sense of the divine, of the incarnate logos, that is of rhetoric as an eloquent and humane means to reach further devotion and further action in the Christian city, which was absent from Ramist formalism. The Ratio is, in rhetoric, the answer to Ignatius Loyola's practice, in devotion, of "spiritual exercises". This complex oratorical-prayer system is absent from Ramism.

=== Seventeenth century ===
In New England and at Harvard College (founded 1636), Ramus and his followers dominated. However, in England, several writers influenced the course of rhetoric during the 17th century, many of them carrying forward the dichotomy that had been set forth by Ramus and his followers during the preceding decades. This century also saw the development of a modern, vernacular style that looked to English, rather than to Greek, Latin, or French models.

Francis Bacon (1561–1626), although not a rhetorician, contributed to the field in his writings. One of the concerns of the age was to find a suitable style for the discussion of scientific topics, which needed above all a clear exposition of facts and arguments, rather than an ornate style. Bacon in his The Advancement of Learning criticized those who are preoccupied with style rather than "the weight of matter, worth of subject, soundness of argument, life of invention, or depth of judgment". On matters of style, he proposed that the style conform to the subject matter and to the audience, that simple words be employed whenever possible, and that the style should be agreeable.

Thomas Hobbes (1588–1679) also wrote on rhetoric. Along with a shortened translation of Aristotle's Rhetoric, Hobbes also produced a number of other works on the subject. Sharply contrarian on many subjects, Hobbes, like Bacon, also promoted a simpler and more natural style that used figures of speech sparingly.

Perhaps the most influential development in English style came out of the work of the Royal Society (founded in 1660), which in 1664 set up a committee to improve the English language. Among the committee's members were John Evelyn (1620–1706), Thomas Sprat (1635–1713), and John Dryden (1631–1700). Sprat regarded "fine speaking" as a disease, and thought that a proper style should "reject all amplifications, digressions, and swellings of style" and instead "return back to a primitive purity and shortness".

While the work of this committee never went beyond planning, John Dryden is often credited with creating and exemplifying a new and modern English style. His central tenet was that the style should be proper "to the occasion, the subject, and the persons". As such, he advocated the use of English words whenever possible instead of foreign ones, as well as vernacular, rather than Latinate, syntax. His own prose (and his poetry) became exemplars of this new style.

=== Eighteenth century ===
Arguably one of the most influential schools of rhetoric during the 18th century was Scottish Belletristic rhetoric, exemplified by such professors of rhetoric as Hugh Blair whose Lectures on Rhetoric and Belles Lettres saw international success in various editions and translations, and Lord Kames with his influential Elements of Criticism.

Another notable figure in 18th century rhetoric was Maria Edgeworth, a novelist and children's author whose work often parodied the male-centric rhetorical strategies of her time. In her 1795 "An Essay on the Noble Science of Self-Justification," Edgeworth presents a satire of Enlightenment rhetoric's science-centrism and the Belletristic Movement. She was called "the great Maria" by Sir Walter Scott, with whom she corresponded, and by modern scholars is noted as "a transgressive and ironic reader" of the 18th century rhetorical norms.

== Modern ==
At the turn of the 20th century, there was a revival of rhetorical study manifested in the establishment of departments of rhetoric and speech at academic institutions, as well as the formation of national and international professional organizations. The early interest in rhetorical studies was a movement away from elocution as taught in English departments in the United States, and an attempt to refocus rhetorical studies from delivery-only to civic engagement and a "rich complexity" of the nature of rhetoric.

By the 1930s, advances in mass media technology led to a revival of the study of rhetoric, language, persuasion, and political rhetoric and its consequences. The linguistic turn in philosophy also contributed to this revival. The term rhetoric came to be applied to media forms other than verbal language, e.g. visual rhetoric, "temporal rhetorics", and the "temporal turn" in rhetorical theory and practice.

The rise of advertising and of mass media such as photography, telegraphy, radio, and film brought rhetoric more prominently into people's lives. The discipline of rhetoric has been used to study how advertising persuades, and to help understand the spread of fake news and conspiracy theories on social media.

=== Notable theorists ===
Kenneth Burke
Burke was a rhetorical theorist, philosopher, and poet. Many of his works are central to modern rhetorical theory: Counterstatement (1931), A Grammar of Motives (1945), A Rhetoric of Motives (1950), and Language as Symbolic Action (1966). Among his influential concepts are "identification", "consubstantiality", and the "dramatistic pentad". He described rhetoric as "the use of language as a symbolic means of inducing cooperation in beings that by nature respond to symbols". In relation to Aristotle's theory, Aristotle was more interested in constructing rhetoric, while Burke was interested in "debunking" it.
The Groupe μ
This interdisciplinary team contributed to the renovation of the elocutio in the context of poetics and modern linguistics, significantly with Rhétorique générale and Rhétorique de la poésie (1977).
Marshall McLuhan
McLuhan was a media theorist whose theories and whose choice of objects of study are important to the study of rhetoric. McLuhan's book The Mechanical Bride was a compilation of exhibits of ads and other materials from popular culture with short essays involving rhetorical analyses of the persuasive strategies in each item. McLuhan later shifted the focus of his rhetorical analysis and began to consider how communication media themselves affect us as persuasive devices. His famous dictum "the medium is the message" highlights the significance of the medium itself. This shift in focus led to his two most widely known books, The Gutenberg Galaxy and Understanding Media. These books represent an inward turn to attending to one's consciousness in contrast to the more outward orientation of other rhetoricians toward sociological considerations and symbolic interaction. No other scholar of the history and theory of rhetoric was as widely publicized in the 20th century as McLuhan.
Chaïm Perelman
Perelman was among the most important argumentation theorists of the 20th century. His chief work is the Traité de l'argumentation—la nouvelle rhétorique (1958), with Lucie Olbrechts-Tyteca, which was translated into English as The New Rhetoric: A Treatise on Argumentation. Perelman and Olbrechts-Tyteca move rhetoric from the periphery to the center of argumentation theory. Among their most influential concepts are "dissociation", "the universal audience", "quasi-logical argument", and "presence".
I. A. Richards
Richards was a literary critic and rhetorician. His The Philosophy of Rhetoric is an important text in modern rhetorical theory. In this work, he defined rhetoric as "a study of misunderstandings and its remedies", and introduced the influential concepts tenor and vehicle to describe the components of a metaphor—the main idea and the concept to which it is compared.
Stephen Toulmin
Toulmin was a philosopher whose Uses of Argument is an important text in modern rhetorical theory and argumentation theory.
Richard M. Weaver
Weaver was a rhetorical and cultural critic known for his contributions to the new conservatism. He focused on the ethical implications of rhetoric in his books Language is Sermonic and The Ethics of Rhetoric. According to Weaver there are four types of argument, and through the argument type a rhetorician habitually uses a critic can discern their worldview. Those who prefer the argument from genus or definition are idealists. Those who argue from similitude, such as poets and religious people, see the connectedness between things. The argument from consequence sees a cause and effect relationship. Finally the argument from circumstance considers the particulars of a situation and is an argument preferred by liberals.

=== Methods of analysis ===
==== Criticism seen as a method ====
Rhetoric can be analyzed by a variety of methods and theories. One such method is criticism. When those using criticism analyze instances of rhetoric what they do is called rhetorical criticism. According to rhetorical critic Jim A. Kuypers, "The use of rhetoric is an art, and as such, it does not lend itself well to scientific methods of analysis. Criticism is an art as well, and as such is particularly well suited for examining rhetorical creations." He asserts that criticism is a method of generating knowledge just as the scientific method is a method for generating knowledge:

The way the Sciences and the Humanities study the phenomena that surround us differ greatly in the amount of researcher personality allowed to influence the results of the study. For example, in the Sciences researchers purposefully adhere to a strict method (the scientific method).... Generally speaking, the researcher's personality, likes and dislikes, and religious and political preferences are supposed to be as far removed as possible from the actual study....

In sharp contrast, criticism (one of many Humanistic methods of generating knowledge) actively involves the personality of the researcher. The very choices of what to study, and how and why to study a rhetorical artifact are heavily influenced by the personal qualities of the researcher.... In the Humanities, methods of research may also take many forms—criticism, ethnography, for example—but the personality of the researcher is an integral component of the study. Further personalizing criticism, we find that rhetorical critics use a variety of means when examining a particular rhetorical artifact, with some critics even developing their own unique perspective to better examine a rhetorical artifact.

— Jim A. Kuypers

Edwin Black wrote on this point that, "Methods, then, admit of varying degrees of personality. And criticism, on the whole, is near the indeterminate, contingent, personal end of the methodological scale. In consequence of this placement, it is neither possible nor desirable for criticism to be fixed into a system, for critical techniques to be objectified, for critics to be interchangeable for purposes of replication, or for rhetorical criticism to serve as the handmaiden of quasi-scientific theory."

Jim A. Kuypers sums this idea of criticism as art in the following manner: "In short, criticism is an art, not a science. It is not a scientific method; it uses subjective methods of argument; it exists on its own, not in conjunction with other methods of generating knowledge (i.e., social scientific or scientific)... [I]nsight and imagination top statistical applications when studying rhetorical action."

=== Strategies ===
Rhetorical strategies are the efforts made by authors or speakers to persuade or inform their audiences. According to James W. Gray, there are various argument strategies used in writing. He describes four of these as argument from analogy, argument from absurdity, thought experiments, and inference to the best explanation.

=== Criticism ===
Modern rhetorical criticism explores the relationship between text and context; that is, how an instance of rhetoric relates to circumstances. Since the aim of rhetoric is to be persuasive, the level to which the rhetoric in question persuades its audience is what must be analyzed, and later criticized. In determining the extent to which a text is persuasive, one may explore the text's relationship with its audience, purpose, ethics, argument, evidence, arrangement, delivery, and style.

In his Rhetorical Criticism: A Study in Method, Edwin Black states, "It is the task of criticism not to measure... discourses dogmatically against some parochial standard of rationality but, allowing for the immeasurable wide range of human experience, to see them as they really are." While "as they really are" is debatable, rhetorical critics explain texts and speeches by investigating their rhetorical situation, typically placing them in a framework of speaker/audience exchange. The antithetical view places the rhetor at the center of creating that which is considered the extant situation; i.e., the agenda and spin.

==== Additional theoretical approaches ====
Following the neo-Aristotelian approaches to criticism, scholars began to derive methods from other disciplines, such as history, philosophy, and the social sciences. The importance of critics' personal judgment decreased in explicit coverage while the analytical dimension of criticism began to gain momentum. Throughout the 1960s and 1970s, methodological pluralism replaced the singular neo-Aristotelian method. Methodological rhetorical criticism is typically done by deduction, in which a broad method is used to examine a specific case of rhetoric. These types include:

Ideological criticism
engages rhetoric as it suggests the beliefs, values, assumptions, and interpretations held by the rhetor or the larger culture
Ideological criticism also treats ideology as an artifact of discourse, one that is embedded in key terms (called "ideographs") as well as material resources and discursive embodiment.
Cluster criticism
seeks to help the critic understand the rhetor's worldview (developed by Kenneth Burke)
This means identifying terms that are "clustered" around key symbols in the rhetorical artifact and the patterns in which they appear.
Frame analysis
looks for how rhetors construct an interpretive lens in their discourse
In short, how they make certain facts more noticeable than others. It is particularly useful for analyzing products of the news media.
Genre criticism
assumes certain situations call for similar needs and expectations within the audience, therefore calling for certain types of rhetoric
It studies rhetoric in different times and locations, looking at similarities in the rhetorical situation and the rhetoric that responds to them. Examples include eulogies, inaugural addresses, and declarations of war.
Narrative criticism
narratives help organize experiences in order to endow meaning to historical events and transformations
Narrative criticism focuses on the story itself and how the construction of the narrative directs the interpretation of the situation.

By the mid-1980s the study of rhetorical criticism began to move away from precise methodology towards conceptual issues. Conceptually-driven criticism operates more through abduction, according to scholar James Jasinski, who argues that this type of criticism can be thought of as a back-and-forth between the text and the concepts, which are being explored at the same time. The concepts remain "works in progress", and understanding those terms develops through the analysis of a text.

Criticism is considered rhetorical when it focuses on the way some types of discourse react to situational exigencies—problems or demands—and constraints. Modern rhetorical criticism concerns how the rhetorical case or object persuades, defines, or constructs the audience. In modern terms, rhetoric includes, but it is not limited to, speeches, scientific discourse, pamphlets, literary work, works of art, and pictures. Contemporary rhetorical criticism has maintained aspects of early neo-Aristotelian thinking through close reading, which attempts to explore the organization and stylistic structure of a rhetorical object. Using close textual analysis means rhetorical critics use the tools of classical rhetoric and literary analysis to evaluate the style and strategy used to communicate the argument.

==== Purpose of criticism ====
Rhetorical criticism serves several purposes. For one, it hopes to help form or improve public taste. It helps educate audiences and develops them into better judges of rhetorical situations by reinforcing ideas of value, morality, and suitability. Rhetorical criticism can thus contribute to the audience's understanding of themselves and society.

According to Jim A. Kuypers, a second purpose for performing criticism should be to enhance our appreciation and understanding. "[W]e wish to enhance both our own and others' understanding of the rhetorical act; we wish to share our insights with others, and to enhance their appreciation of the rhetorical act. These are not hollow goals, but quality of life issues. By improving understanding and appreciation, the critic can offer new and potentially exciting ways for others to see the world. Through understanding we also produce knowledge about human communication; in theory this should help us to better govern our interactions with others." Criticism is a humanizing activity in that it explores and highlights qualities that make us human.

== Animal rhetoric ==
Scholars of rhetoric have generally limited their interest in persuasion to human interaction. However, some argue that rhetoric is practiced by social animals in a variety of ways, such as vocalizations, courtship display, and deception. While these might be understood as rhetorical actions (attempts at persuading through meaningful actions and utterances), they may also be seen as rhetorical fundamentals shared by humans and animals. The study of animal rhetoric has been called "biorhetorics".

The self-awareness required to practice rhetoric might be difficult to notice and acknowledge in some animals. However, some animals are capable of acknowledging themselves in a mirror, and therefore, they might be understood to be self-aware and therefore, argue philosophers such as Diane Davis, are able to engage with rhetoric when practicing some form of language.

Anthropocentrism plays a significant role in human-animal relationships, reflecting and perpetuating binaries in which humans assume they are beings that have extraordinary qualities while they regard animals as beings that lack those qualities. This dualism is manifested in other forms as well, such as reason and sense, mind and body, ideal and phenomenal in which the first category of each pair (reason, mind, and ideal) represents and belongs to only humans. By becoming aware of and overcoming these dualistic conceptions including the one between humans and animals, humans will be able to more easily engage with and communicate with animals, with the understanding that animals are capable of reciprocating communication. The relationship between humans and animals (as well as the rest of the natural world) is often defined by the human rhetorical act of naming and categorizing animals through scientific and folk labeling. The act of naming partially defines the rhetorical relationships between humans and animals, though both may engage in rhetoric beyond human naming and categorizing.

Some animals have been proposed to have a sort of phrónēsis, which enables them to "learn and receive instruction" with rudimentary understanding of some significant signs. Those animals are said practice deliberative, judicial, and epideictic rhetoric, deploying ethos, logos, and pathos with gesture and vocal noises. Removing focus on verbal language and consciousness concepts has been proposed to help people interested in rhetoric and communication to promote human-animal rhetoric.

== Comparative rhetoric ==
Comparative rhetoric is a practice and methodology that developed in the late twentieth century to broaden the study of rhetoric beyond the dominant rhetorical tradition that has been constructed and shaped in western Europe and the U.S. As a research practice, comparative rhetoric studies past and present cultures across the globe to reveal diversity in the uses of rhetoric and to uncover rhetorical perspectives, practices, and traditions that have been historically underrepresented or dismissed. As a methodology, comparative rhetoric constructs a culture's rhetorical perspectives, practices, and traditions on their own terms, in their own contexts, as opposed to using European or American theories, terminology, or framing.

Comparative rhetoric is comparative in that it illuminates how rhetorical traditions relate to one another, while seeking to avoid binary depictions or value judgments. This can reveal issues of power within and between cultures as well as new or under-recognized ways of thinking, doing, and being that challenge or enrich the dominant Euro-American tradition and provide a fuller account of rhetorical studies.

Robert T. Oliver is credited as the first scholar who recognized the need to study non-Western rhetorics in his 1971 publication Communication and Culture in Ancient India and China. George A. Kennedy has been credited for the first cross-cultural overview of rhetoric in his 1998 publication Comparative Rhetoric: An Historical and Cross-cultural Introduction. Though Oliver's and Kennedy's works contributed to the birth of comparative rhetoric, given the newness of the field, they both used Euro-American terms and theories to interpret non-Euro-American cultures' practices.

LuMing Mao, Xing Lu, Mary Garrett, Arabella Lyon, Bo Wang, Hui Wu, and Keith Lloyd have published extensively on comparative rhetoric, helping to shape and define the field. In 2013, LuMing Mao edited a special issue on comparative rhetoric in Rhetoric Society Quarterly, focusing on comparative methodologies in the age of globalization. In 2015, LuMing Mao and Bo Wang coedited a symposium featuring position essays by a group of leading scholars in the field. In their introduction, Mao and Wang emphasize the fluid and cross-cultural nature of rhetoric, "Rhetorical knowledge, like any other knowledge, is heterogeneous, multidimentional, and always in the process of being created." The symposium includes "A Manifesto: The What and How of Comparative Rhetoric", demonstrating the first collective effort to identify and articulate comparative rhetoric's definition, goals, and methodologies. The tenets of this manifesto are engaged within many later works that study or utilize comparative rhetoric.

== Automatic detection of rhetorical figures ==
As natural language processing has developed, so has interest in automatically detecting rhetorical figures. The major focus has been to detect specific figures, such as chiasmus, epanaphora, and epiphora using classifiers trained with labeled data. A major shortcoming to achieving high accuracy with these systems is the shortage of labeled data for these tasks; however, a 2020 study argues that advances in language modeling such as few-shot learning may make it possible to detect more rhetorical figures with less data.

== The Rhetorical Tradition Summary ==
"The Rhetorical Tradition", written by W. Keith, is about how rhetoric as a concept is seen and used in everyday events. Some of those events can be debates, advertisments, in the courtroom. Rhetoric is used to persuade people on how to think or act towards speeches, symbols, or language. The term was defined in a multitude of ways, but overall focuses on the use of persuasiveness and its effectiveness. Persuasion is the influence that someone has over a topic. There is also discourse, another concept about rhetoric. Discourse is the written or spoken speech used. Rhetoric is used in everyday life and is constantly around us.

== See also ==
- Artes liberales
- Civic humanism
- Composition studies
- Conversation theory
- Demagogy
- Discourse analysis
- Glossary of rhetoric
- Grammarian (Greco-Roman world)
- Kishōtenketsu
- Language and thought
- List of political slogans
- List of speeches
- Multimodality
- New rhetoric
- Pedagogy
- Persuasion technology
- Propaganda
- Speechwriting
- Technical communication
