= Heracles' Bow =

1985 work by James Boyd White

- Author: James Boyd White
- Language: English
- Genre: Law
- Publication date: 1985

Heracles' Bow: Essays on the Rhetoric and Poetics of the Law is a collection of ten essays, written by James Boyd White in 1985, that examine forensic rhetoric as it creates community, as an example of what White calls constitutive rhetoric. White supported the Law and Literature Movement. This movement was in contrast to two other movements of the 1970s and 1980s, Law and economics and Critical Legal Studies (CLS), in holding that a scientific view of law left little room to examine the rhetoric of written and spoken law itself.

== Content summary ==
In Heracles' Bow: Persuasion and Community in Sophocles' Philoctetes, James Boyd White, through an analysis of the ancient Greek play Philoctetes, distinguishes between two methods of persuasion: dolos (deceitful persuasion) and peitho (genuine statements made for the purpose of forming community). White compares using rhetoric on another person as a means-to-an-end against viewing the person as an end-in-itself. He relates this to the teaching of law through a discussion of methods that an attorney should use in the art of persuading others.

In Rhetoric and Law: The Arts of Cultural and Communal Life, White compares two definitions of law: his own, which is that law is a branch of rhetoric, and the traditional view of law as institutional authority. He outlines three elements specific and necessary to legal rhetoric: first, that lawyers need to speak the language of their audience, or that law is culture-specific; second, that law is always a creative performance; and third, that legal rhetoric contains an ethical identity, or ethos.

The Study of Law as an Intellectual Activity: A Talk to Entering Students, originally a lecture given to a class of first-year law students, outlines how learning law is not simply memorizing a set of rules. White claims that, in learning law, it is imperative that students first identify their own ethos to become effective practitioners.

In The Invisible Discourse of the Law: Reflections on Legal Literacy and General Education, originally a lecture given to educators on writing, White argues that legal language is difficult to understand because the law is generalized and non-specific. These characteristics mean that legal language is always subject to the interpretation of the reader, thus creating a rhetorical situation.

White contends in Reading Law and Reading Literature: Law as Language that law is a language and a lawyer must also operate as a literary critic. He explains how law is its own form of language, which means that it is subject to open interpretation. The language of the law creates a legal culture just as spoken languages have cultures associated with them. A lawyer must use good judgment in interpreting the law just as individuals use good judgment in interpreting how to speak to one another.

In The Judicial Opinion and the Poem: Ways of Reading, Ways of Life White examines how reading poems and cases during his legal training enforced his belief that the practice of law is an art, and one can use this training to discover Truth.

In Fact, Fiction, and Value in Historical Narrative: Gibbon's Roads of Rome, White reasons that it is impossible for a narrative to exclude the author's values, no matter how factual it may be. Using Gibbon's History of the Decline and Fall of the Roman Empire as an example, he illustrates how the form, syntax, and presentation of any writing necessarily shape the way a reader receives the facts. As a result, the opinion of the reader is shaped by the opinion of the writer.

Telling Stories in the Law and in Ordinary Life: The Oresteia and "Noon Wine" explores how legal stories take root in the stories told by laypeople in social situations. He argues that it is impossible to tell a story in the language of the law without relying on a non-legal situation.

In Making Sense of What We Do: The Criminal Law as a System of Meaning, White asks whether criminal law makes sense as a system of meaning. He seeks to answer that question through an examination of the purpose of criminal law, which he concludes to be placing blame. He examines the rhetoric of criminal law in order to identify its true audience.

In the last essay, Plato's Gorgias and the Modern Lawyer: A Dialogue on the Ethics of Argument, White constructs his own Socratic dialogue to determine whether the ancient Platonian argument of rhetoric vs. dialectic can be applied to modern law. He argues that today's attorneys are a modern-day version of Plato's "Gorgias" and concludes with the importance of maintaining ethics in the practice of law.

== Scholarly review ==
David Cole argues that White's view and the CLS are not that different; both are built on ideology. Cole criticizes White for relying too much on law as an end in itself, and failing to address the practical application of tangible, codified law. Meanwhile, Weisberg's main criticism of Heracles' Bow is that White's explanation remains too abstract. He contends that White does not express any knowledge of the actual law or the application thereof. Weisburg argues that White relies on law too much as a function of pure rhetoric, and that he ignores the scientific aspect of the discipline. This is a common criticism of the Law and Literature Movement. Victoria Kahn claims that White's view of the law ignores the relationship of law and inequality. She criticizes his work for its lack of explaining how the rhetoric of law is applied to different genders, races, and classes in different ways. She argues that seeing law simply as a rhetorical situation ignores the real-life power struggles within the application of law to society.
