= Eithne Luibhéid =

Academic in gender and women's studies

Academic background
- Education: Hampshire College (BA, 1986); University of Massachusetts (MA, 1992); University of California, Berkeley (PhD, 1998)

Academic work
- Discipline: Gender and women's studies
- Institutions: Bowling Green State University (1999–2005); University of Arizona (2005-present)

Eithne P. Luibhéid is an academic in the field of gender and women's studies. Her research explores the connections between immigration and queer identities, particularly in the United States.

== Education ==
Luibhéid received a Bachelor of Arts in liberal arts from Hampshire College in 1986, after which she attended the University of Massachusetts, receiving a Master of Arts in English as a Second Language studies in 1992. In 1998, she earned a Doctor of Philosophy in ethnic studies from the University of California at Berkeley, where her research focused on women, gender, and sexuality.

After receiving her doctorate, Luibhéid was a postdoctoral fellow with the Residential Research Group on the Futures of Queer Studies at the University of Irvine.

== Career ==
Luibhéid began her career at Bowling Green State University, where she worked from 1999 to 2005. She joined the University of Arizona in 2005 as the director of the Committee for LGBT Studies, becoming the Founding Director of the university's Institute for Lesbian, Gay, Bisexual and Transgender Studies in 2005, a position she held until 2011. As of 2026, she serves as a professor and acting director of the university's gender and women's studies, as well as director of the university's graduate program. Her "research examines the connections among queer lives, racialization processes, state immigration controls, and citizenship".

Luibhéid is the author of Entry Denied: Controlling Sexuality at the Border (2002), Pregnant on Arrival: Making the 'Illegal' Immigrant (2013), and Abolitionist Intimacies: Queer and Trans Migrants Against the Deportation State (2025). She is the editor of Lives that Resist Telling: Migrant and Refugee Lesbians (2021), as well as co-editor of Queer Migrations: Sexuality, U.S. Citizenship, and Border Crossings (2005), with Lionel Cantú; A Global History of Sexuality (2014), with Robert M. Buffington and Donna J. Guy; and Queer and Trans Migrations: Dynamics of 'Illegalization,' Detention, and Deportation (2020), with Karma R. Chávez.

Abolitionist Intimacies is a finalist for the 2026 Lambda Literary Award for LGBTQ+ Studies.

== Publications ==
- Luibhéid, Eithne (2002). Entry Denied: Controlling Sexuality at the Border. University of Minnesota Press. ISBN 978-0-816-63803-1.
- Luibhéid, Eithne; Cantú, Lionel, eds. (2005). Queer Migrations: Sexuality, U.S. Citizenship, and Border Crossings. University of Minnesota Press. ISBN 978-0-252-05219-4.
- Luibhéid, Eithne (2013). Pregnant on Arrival: Making the 'Illegal' Immigrant. University of Minnesota Press. ISBN 978-0-816-68543-1.
- Buffington, Robert M.; Luibhéid, Eithne; Guy, Donna J., eds. (2014). A Global History of Sexuality. Wiley Blackwell. ISBN 978-0-252-05219-4.
- Luibhéid, Eithne; Chavez, Karma R., eds. (2020). Queer and Trans Migrations: Dynamics of 'Illegalization,' Detention, and Deportation. University of Illinois Press. ISBN 978-0-252-05219-4.
- Luibhéid, Eithne, ed. (2021). Lives that Resist Telling: Migrant and Refugee Lesbians. Routledge. ISBN 978-1-000-36109-4.
- Luibhéid, Eithne (2025). Abolitionist Intimacies: Queer and Trans Migrants Against the Deportation State. Duke University Press. ISBN 978-1-478-06026-0.
