= Constitutive rhetoric =

Theory of discourse

Constitutive rhetoric is a theory of discourse devised by James Boyd White about the capacity of language or symbols to create a collective identity for an audience, especially by means of condensation symbols, literature, and narratives. Such discourse often demands that action be taken to reinforce the identity and the beliefs of that identity. White explains that it denotes "the art of constituting character, community and culture in language."

== Development of constitutive rhetorical theory ==
The constitutive model of rhetoric dates back to the ancient Greek Sophists, with theories that speech moved audiences to action based on a contingent, shared knowledge. Kenneth Burke contributed to the theory of constitutive rhetoric by highlighting identification, rather than persuasion, as the major means by which language functioned. Burke contended that social identity is founded "spontaneously, intuitively, even unconsciously." Edwin Black's theory of the second persona also aided scholars in rhetoric to analyze the imagined shared values and beliefs between speaker and audience through textual analysis. Audience must adopt a particular ethos prior to being persuaded by constitutive rhetoric, thus the ethos of the subject of discourse can be critically studied and interpreted through a text.

While these theorists all contributed to the theory of constitutive rhetoric, James Boyd White was the first to coin the term. In 1985, he explained that the term "constitutive rhetoric" described rhetoric that called a common, collective identity into existence. White wrote that persuasion and identification occur only when audiences already understand and relate to method and content. Thus, speech happens within culture, and speakers adapt messages to reflect the ideas and views of a community. When speeches address a diverse crowd as though they are of one community, White describes this as "calling [identity] into being" through material identification.

According to White, there are two methods of convincing an audience that they belong to an identity. The first is peithõ, persuasion, and the second is deceitful manipulation, or dolos. Using peithõ, speakers convince audiences of shared identity openly and honestly. Dolos creates belonging through deceit.

In 1987, Maurice Charland further emphasized the importance of the narrative and Marxist theory He observed, "While classical narratives have an ending, constitutive rhetorics leave the task of narrative closure to their constituted subjects". Charland's theory draws from Burke and the philosopher Louis Althusser. Althusser explained interpellation, or "hailing", as the social phenomenon of a mass audience having already been "recruited" by an ideology. Ideologies create subjects of discourse for persuasion by further discourse. In other words, "the very existence of social subjects (who would become audience members) is already a rhetorical effect."

Political speeches, manifestos, and resistance movements participate in this type of discourse, to establish an identity and a call to action within that identity. A leader's speech calling a "nation" to war establishes a national identity within the discourse or text. A feminist speaking on women's right establishes the identity of the "woman". An African-American protesting during the Civil Rights Movement established an "African-American" identity. Every audience member may take part in shared identity because of common symbolic resources, even as the text may especially interpellate a smaller sub-group of the audience. An identity must be established in contrast to another identity. This creates divisions between "us" and "them", sometimes creating extreme divisions between different identifications.

In 2015, Halstrøm and Galle picked up on constitutive rhetoric within the field of design studies. They explained how it may provide useful concepts for analysing designed artefacts. Design may be said to aim at providing an audience with a subject position, which it is to confirm. Thus, it aims at persuading by seeking to constitute its audience.

== Critical reception ==
Constitutive rhetoric and theories of logical persuasion (such as New Criticism or Neo-Aristotelianism) can be used together, but constitutive rhetoric presumes that belief and identity always precedes logical persuasion. Thus, constitutive rhetoric must address the previous identity and must either coincide with it, or change it.

Jacques Derrida criticized the paradox of constitutive rhetoric when he analyzed the United States Declaration of Independence. He explained that the men signing the Declaration claimed to be representatives of "the people", but the people were not yet defined as a nation until that Declaration was signed. His criticism explains that an identity must be established before that identity exists in order for the speaker to represent the ideals of that identity, thus creating a paradoxical relationship in which only a third perspective can truly analyze the identity of the audience.

Constitutive rhetoric and, in particular, Maurice Charland's development of the theory, is a central theoretical basis for much of racial rhetorical criticism. In Deportable and Disposable: Public Rhetoric and the Making of the "Illegal" Immigrant, for example, Lisa A. Flores emphasizes that constitutive rhetoric is "boundary-forming" and "calls into being othered populations." Likewise, in her article that named the subfield, Flores indicates that a focus on the discursive constitution of identities has been central to much scholarship in racial rhetorical criticism.

== See also ==
- Heracles' Bow
