= Rhetorical criticism =

Literary criticism concerning rhetoric

Rhetorical criticism analyzes the symbolic artifacts of discourse—the words, phrases, images, gestures, performances, texts, films, etc. that people use to communicate. Rhetorical analysis shows how the artifacts work, how well they work, and how the artifacts, as discourse, inform and instruct, entertain and arouse, and convince and persuade the audience; as such, discourse includes the possibility of morally improving the reader, the viewer, and the listener. Rhetorical criticism studies and analyzes the purpose of the words, sights, and sounds that are the symbolic artifacts used for communications among people.

Rhetorical criticism as an intellectual practice is known from the Classical Greek period (5th–4th c. BC). In the dialogue Phaedrus (c. 370 BC), Plato presents the philosopher Socrates as analyzing a speech by Lysias (230e–235e) the logographer (speech writer) to determine whether or not it is praiseworthy. Its current role has been summarised as follows.

Criticism is an art, not a science. It is not a scientific method; it uses subjective methods of argument; it exists on its own, not in conjunction with other methods of generating knowledge (i.e., social scientific or scientific).

Its academic purpose is greater understanding and appreciation in human relations:

By improving understanding and appreciation, the critic can offer new, and potentially exciting, ways for others to see the world. Through understanding we also produce knowledge about human communication; in theory, this should help us to better govern our interactions with others.

== Rhetorical analysis ==
What is called "rhetorical criticism" in the Speech Communication discipline is often called "rhetorical analysis" in English. Through this analytical process, an analyst defines, classifies, analyzes, interprets and evaluates a rhetorical artifact. Through this process a critic explores, by means of various approaches, the manifest and latent meaning of a piece of rhetoric thereby offering further insight into the field of rhetorical studies generally and into an artifact or rhetor specifically. Such an analysis, for example may reveal the particular motivations or ideologies of a rhetor, how he or she interprets the aspects of a rhetorical situation, or how cultural ideologies are manifested in an artifact. It could also demonstrate how the constraints of a particular situation shape the rhetoric that responds to it. Certain approaches also examine how rhetorical elements compare with the traditional elements of a narrative or drama.

=== Definition ===
Generally speaking, the average audience member lacks the knowledge or experience to recognize rhetoric at first glance. Therefore, one of the more important functions of rhetorical studies is to determine whether an artifact is inherently rhetorical. This involves the identification of the exigence, rhetor's constraints, audience, and the artifact's persuasive potential.

=== Classification ===
Criticism also classifies rhetorical discourses into generic categories either by explicit argumentation or as an implicit part of the critical process. For example, the evaluative standard that the rhetorician utilizes will undoubtedly be gleaned from other works of rhetoric and, thus, impose a certain category. The same can be said about the examples and experts quoted within the work of criticism.

Classical genres of rhetoric include apologia, epideictic, or jeremiad but have been expanded to encompass numerous other categories.

=== Analysis ===
Within the realm of rhetorical criticism, analysis involves examining structure and analyzing how the individual rhetorical and communicative elements work within the context of the artifact. Rhetorical criticism is an art that involves the rhetorician developing strong reasoning for their judgement. The rhetorician must act as a rhetorical critic of their own work, they must examine the necessity of their research as well as the analysis. A rhetorician must also be able to defend the method of their analysis and the accuracy of their research.

=== Interpretation ===
Closely related with analysis, interpretation widens the scope of the examination to include the historical and cultural context of the artifact. A rhetorician should, at this point, draw comparisons with other established works of rhetoric to determine how well the artifact fits into a particular category or if it redefines the constraints of that category as well as how the elements illuminate the motivation and perspectives of a rhetor. Rhetorical criticism can then be broken into judgment and understanding. Judgment is concerned with determining the effectiveness of the information and the strategies of presentation that leads to the success or failure of the artifact. The understanding is drawn from the acknowledgment and acceptance of what has been presented.

=== Evaluation ===
The purposes of rhetorical criticism fall within three evaluative categories: academic, ethical, and political. Academic purposes seek to further the process of rhetorical study. Ethical purposes attempt to reveal implicit cultural values or unethical manipulations. Political purposes involve revealing hegemonic power structures in order to expose oppressive discourses or give voice to marginalized groups. Rhetorical criticism has gained more recognition and importance in the past forty years, especially in the academic field. This increase in interest has led to colleges and universities devoting more courses to the study of rhetorical matters such as rhetorical criticism.

== Approaches ==
Sources:

- Neo-Aristotelian (this perspective is sometimes also known as the "traditional" perspective)
- Narrative
- Metaphoric
- Genre
- Pentadic
- Cluster
- Ideological
- Racial Rhetorical Criticism
- Framing

== Notable scholars ==
- Karma R. Chávez
- Kenneth Burke
- Edwin Black (rhetorician)
- Walter Brueggemann
- Karlyn Kohrs Campbell
- Lloyd Bitzer
- Lisa A. Flores
- Celeste Condit
- Sonja K. Foss
- Walter Fisher
- Jim A. Kuypers
- Michael Calvin McGee
- James Muilenburg
- Phyllis Trible
- Herbert Wichelns
- Wayne C. Booth
