= Racial rhetorical criticism =

Approach to rhetorical criticism

Racial rhetorical criticism is an approach to rhetorical criticism that was named by Lisa A. Flores in 2016. Racial rhetorical criticism organizes textual and cultural analysis around a recognition that racial oppression, histories, and logics shape communication and culture. It also approaches the construction of race as a rhetorical process. More recently, Flores has argued that racial rhetorical criticism also involves subjecting existing "rhetorical theories, methods, [and] practices" to a racially-informed analysis and "revise them" in a way that makes it less likely that scholars will avoid grappling with race. As an example of this latter kind of racial rhetorical criticism, Flores references scholarship by rhetorical critics that supplements understanding of traditional rhetorical terms with analysis of how race shapes and complicates the meaning of these traditional rhetorical terms.

== History ==
Although Flores named racial rhetorical criticism in 2016, Flores notes that scholarship in the area precedes her naming of the subfield. Flores cites scholars such as Molefi Kete Asante, Kirt Wilson, Karma Chávez, and Bernadette Calafell, among others, as individuals who produced racial rhetorical criticism prior to 2016 Flores and others have noted that the relative marginalization of racial rhetorical criticism despite its "abundance" attests to the racism built into rhetorical and communication studies.

== Conceptual frameworks ==
Racial rhetorical criticism is informed by a range of conceptual frameworks including but not limited to intersectionality, constitutive rhetoric, and embodied knowledge consistent with standpoint theory. Like Flores, Karrieann Soto Vega and Karma Chávez, for example, argue that racial rhetorical criticism must attend to the intersections of interlocking systems of oppression. As for constitutive rhetoric, Flores emphasizes that constitutive rhetoric is "boundary-forming" and "calls into being othered populations." As a result, Flores notes that a focus on the discursive constitution of identities has been central to much scholarship in racial rhetorical criticism. Regarding embodied knowledge, Flores notes that, often, women of color--including racial rhetorical critics--derive theory from insights and reflections specific to their positionalities.

== Disciplinary reception ==
Racial rhetorical criticism has become an influential framework in rhetorical and communication studies and was the subject of a forum dedicated to the issue published in the journal of Communication and Critical/Cultural Studies. At the same time, Flores notes that disciplinary and institutional appreciation of racial rhetorical criticism is not as high as the abundance of this scholarship might warrant.
