= John Franklin Genung =

American scholar and professor of rhetoric

- Born: 1850; Willseyville, New York
- Died: 1919 (aged 68–69); Amherst, Massachusetts
- Occupations: Scholar and College Professor
- Known for: Rhetoric

Academic background
- Education: University of Leipzig

John Franklin Genung (1850-1919) was an academic and scholar of rhetoric and biblical exegesis. He taught English at Amherst College from 1882 until 1917. Genung's textbook on rhetorical theory, entitled The Practical Elements of Rhetoric, was published in 1887 and widely used. It was followed by additional volumes for use in schools including Outlines of Rhetoric (1889), The Working Principles of Rhetoric (1900), and Outlines of Composition and Rhetoric (1915), co-authored with Charles Lane Hanson.

== Biography ==
=== Early life ===
Genung was born on January 27, 1850 in Willeysville, New York, the son of Abram C. Genung, a farmer and carpenter, and Martha Dye Genung. The family also included a twin brother, George Franklin Genung.

=== Education ===
Genung attended Owego Academy in Owego, New York before focusing on literature and biblical studies at Union College, where he graduated in 1870. Genung next attended Rochester Theological Seminary, graduating in 1875, and later became a Baptist minister. He served as a pastor for three years in Baldwinsville, New York, before attending the University of Leipzig, Germany to study literature at the doctoral level, earning a PhD in 1881.

=== Teaching and professional experience ===
Genung's career as an educator begin in 1882 when he was appointed as an instructor of English language at Amherst College. He would remain at Amherst for the rest of his professional life, earning the rank of associate professor in 1884, and carrying titles of professor of rhetoric (1889), professor of literary and Biblical interpretation (1906), and finally, professor emeritus (1917).

== Professional contributions ==
According to Composition history scholar James A. Berlin, Genung's textbooks were influential in the late 19th and early 20th centuries in part because they helped to move rhetorical instruction from a study of classics to a focus on the uses of rhetoric in contemporary speaking and writing, and in student's own writing. His textbooks were less like the practice workbooks in high school English classes, and introduced students to the application of theoretical principles in their own writing.

At Amherst, he founded the literary journal Amherst Graduates' Quarterly, which he edited until his death in 1919. He is also known for penning the lyrics to Amherst College songs, "The Soul of Old Amherst" and "Memory Song," which became part of traditional commencement exercises.

== Selected works ==
=== Books ===
- The Practical Elements of Rhetoric.Boston: Ginn and Company, 1886. OCLC 15293481
- Outlines of Rhetoric: Embodied in Rules, Illustrative Examples, and a Progressive Course of Prose Composition. Boston: Ginn and Company, 1899. OCLC 2621883
- The Working Principles of Rhetoric Examined in Their Literary Relations and Illustrated with Examples. Boston: Ginn and Company, 1900. OCLC 394315
- Outlines of Composition and Rhetoric [with Charles Lane Hanson]. Boston: Ginn and Company, 1915. OCLC 4535845
- The life indeed; a review, in terms of common thinking, of the Scripture history issuing in immortality, by John Franklin Genung. Boston, Marshall Jones company, 1921 (published posthumously). https://archive.org/details/lifeindeedreview01genu/page/n7/mode/2up OCLC
