= Nancy A. Naples =

American sociologist

Academic background
- Education: New York University ( M.A. 1974); Hunter College School of Social Work, City University of New York (M.S.W 1979); CUNY Graduate Center (Ph.D 1988).
- Thesis: (1988)

Academic work
- Institutions: University of Connecticut, formerly: University of California, Irvine, Iowa State University, State University of New York, Old Westbury, Columbia University, State University of New York, Purchase, Queens College, City University of New York.
- Doctoral students: Lionel Cantú
- Main interests: Sociology, Immigration and Citizenship, Social Movements, Social Policy, Feminism, Race, Class, and Gender.
- Website: https://sociology.uconn.edu/person/nancy-naples/

Nancy A. Naples is an American sociologist, and currently Board of Trustees Distinguished Professor of Sociology and Women's, Gender, and Sexuality Studies at the University of Connecticut, where she is also director of graduate studies. She has contributed significantly to the study of community activism, poverty in the United States, inequality in rural communities, and methodology in women's studies and feminism.

== Education ==
Naples received her M.A. in dance education from New York University in 1974, and in 1979 she received a Master of Social Work in social policy from Hunter College School of Social Work, City University of New York. She completed a PhD in sociology at Graduate Center of the City University of New York in 1988.

== Career ==
From 1984 to 1988, Naples worked as an adjunct lecturer at Queens College, City University of New York, and Columbia University. Within this period, she worked as a lecturer in the Department of sociology, Anthropology, and Economics at State University of New York, Purchase. In 1988, she became an assistant professor at State University of New York, Old Westbury, before continuing to Iowa State University (1989–1992), and University of California, Irvine (1992–1998). In 1998, she became an associate professor in sociology and women's studies at University of California, Irvine. She then moved to University of Connecticut in 2001 where she started as an associate professor, progressed to a full professor, and in 2014 was made Board of Trustees Distinguished Professor of Sociology and Women's, Gender, and Sexuality Studies.

Naples has been chair of organisations, including the Race, Gender and Class Section of the American Sociological Association, the Discrimination Committee of Sociologists for Women in Society, and the Conflict, Social Action and Change Division of the Society for the Study of Social Problems. She has also served as president of the Eastern Sociological Society and the Society for the Study of Social Problems. Much of Naples' career has been focused on Women's, Gender and Sexuality Studies, and in reflection of this she has been the director of related programs at University of California, Irvine, and the University of Connecticut.

Naples was awarded the Jessie Bernard Award by the American Sociological Association, which recognises scholarly work that has enlarged the horizons of sociology to encompass fully the role of women in society.

== Research ==
Naples works with ethnographic, discourse analysis, archival, and comparative research methods to explore the connection between social actors and economic and political structures and policies. Her work has addressed rural economic development, community activism, globalization, and welfare. Inter-sectional feminism has been a consistent focus of and trend in Naples' research.

== Selected works ==
- Naples, Nancy A. (ed.), Wiley-Blackwell Encyclopedia of Gender and Sexualities Studies Oxford: Wiley-Blackwell (2016).
- Naples, Nancy A; Bickhman Mendez, Jennifer (eds.), Border Politics: Social Movements, Collective Identities, and Globalization, New York: New York University Press (2015).
- Cantú, Lionel; Vidal-Oritz, Salvador; Naples, Nancy A (eds.), The Sexuality of Migration: Border Crossing and Mexican Immigrant Men. New York: New York University Press (2009).
- Naples, Nancy A. (ed.), Feminism and Method: Ethnography, Discourse Analysis, and Activist Research. New York: Routledge (2003).
- Naples, Nancy A., Grassroots Warriors: Activist Mothering, Community Work, and the War on Poverty. New York: Routledge (1998).
