= In Praise of Folly =

1509 essay by Desiderius Erasmus

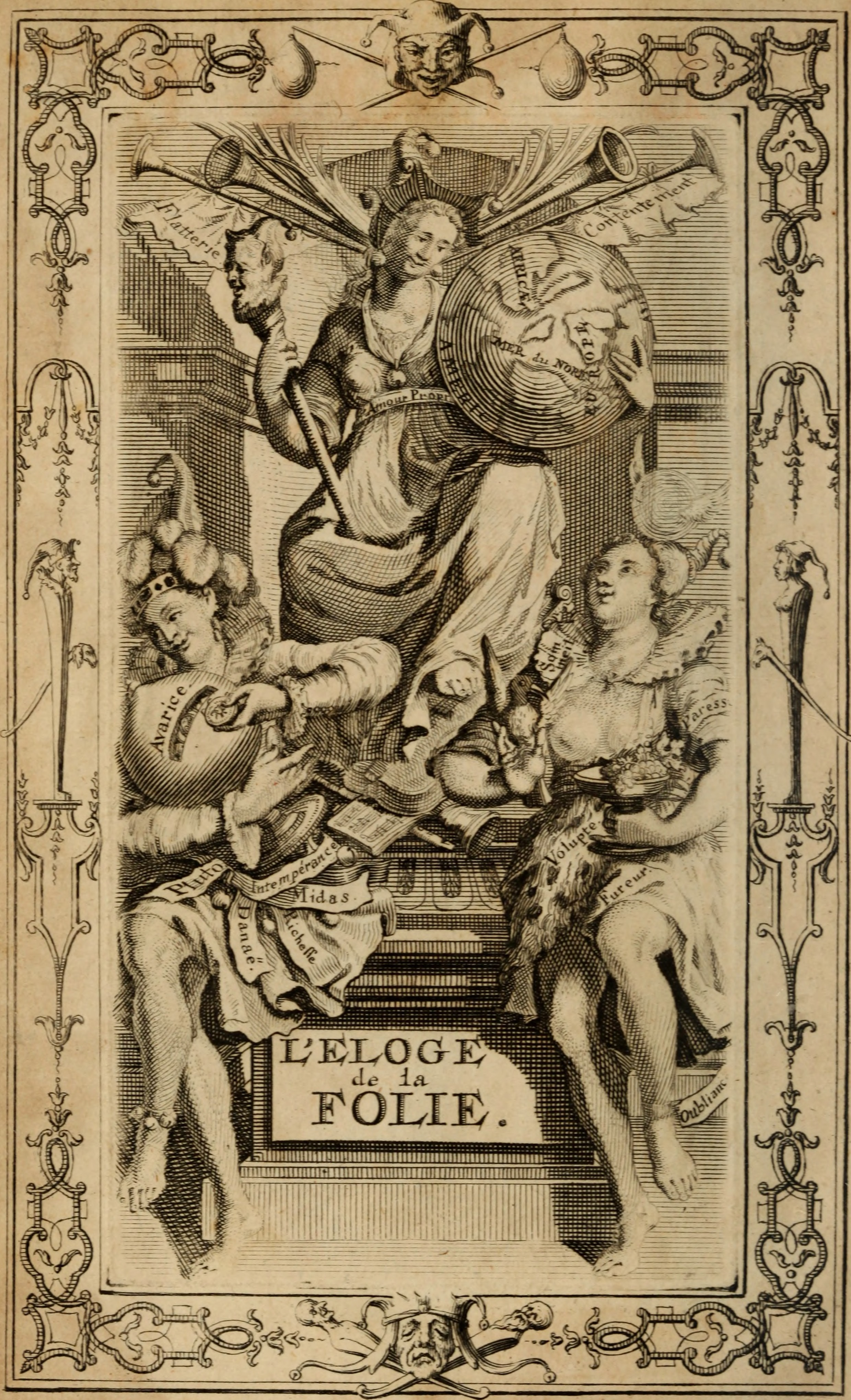
- Cover of a 1728 French edition, L'Éloge de la Folie
- Author: Desiderius Erasmus
- Original title: Moriae encomium
- Translator: Thomas Chaloner; White Kennett; James Copner; John Wilson; Harry Carter; Betty Radice
- Language: Latin
- Genre: essay, theology
- Publisher: Gilles de Gourmont
- Publication date: 1511, revised many times up to 1532
- Publication place: France
- English publication date: 1549
- Media type: Print: hardback
- Dewey Decimal: 873.04
- LC Class: PA8514 .E5
- Preceded by: Handbook of a Christian Knight
- Followed by: Copia: Foundations of the Abundant Style
- Original text: Moriae encomium at Latin Wikisource
- Translation: In Praise of Folly at Wikisource

In Praise of Folly, also translated as The Praise of Folly (Latin: Stultitiae Laus or Moriae Encomium), is an oration written in Latin in 1509 by Desiderius Erasmus of Rotterdam and first printed in June 1511. Inspired by previous works of the Italian humanist Faustino Perisauli's De Triumpho Stultitiae, it is a spiralling satirical attack on all aspects of human life, not ignoring superstitions and religious corruption, but with a pivot into an orthodox religious purpose.

Erasmus revised and extended his work, which, he claims, was originally written in the span of a week while sojourning with Sir Thomas More at More's house in Bucklersbury in the City of London. The title Moriae Encomium had a punning second meaning as In Praise of More (in Greek μωρία translates into "folly"). In Praise of Folly is considered one of the most notable works of the Renaissance and played an important role in the beginnings of the Protestant Reformation.

== Content ==
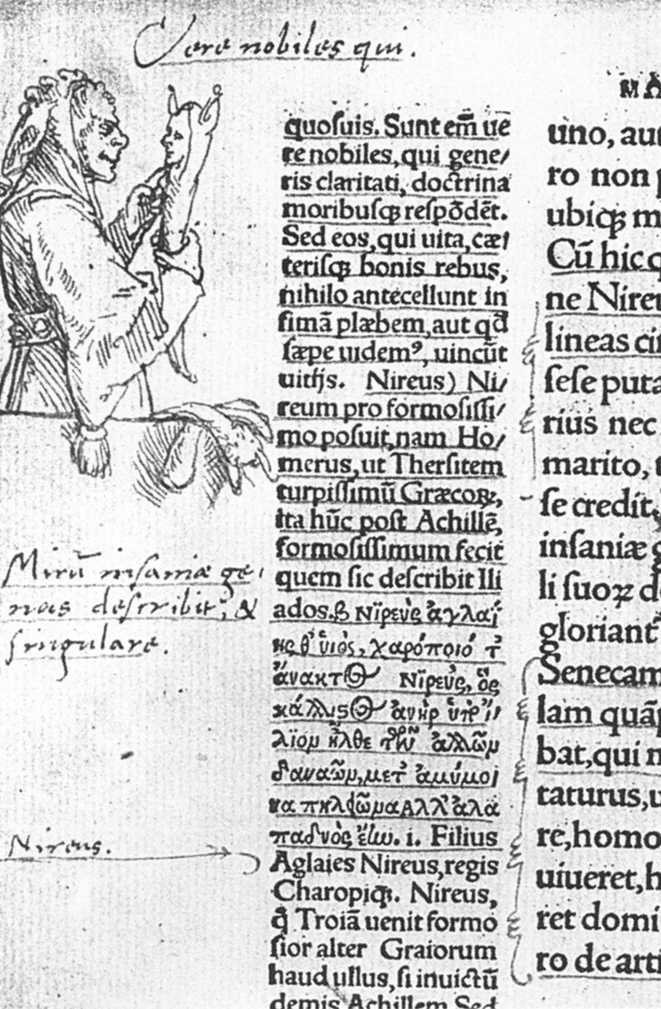
Hans Holbein's witty marginal drawing of Folly (1515), in a copy owned by Erasmus himself

The Praise of Folly begins with a satirical learned encomium, in which Folly praises herself, in the manner of the Greek satirist Lucian (2nd century AD), whose work Erasmus and Sir Thomas More had recently translated into Latin; Folly swipes at every part of society, from lovers to princes to inventors to writers to dice-players to professional liars to hermits.

It then takes a darker tone in a series of orations, as Folly praises self-deception and madness and moves to a satirical examination of supposedly pious but superstitious abuses of Catholic doctrine and corrupt practices by the people and priests of the contemporary church—to which Erasmus was ever faithful—and the folly of pedants. (Note: Erasmus had recently returned disappointed from Rome, where he had turned down offers of advancement in the curia,) Folly increasingly takes on Erasmus' own chastising voice. According to some source, the essay ends with a straightforward statement of Christian ideal: "No Man is wise at all Times, or is without his blind Side."

Erasmus was a good friend of More, with whom he shared a taste for dry humour and other intellectual pursuits. The title Moriae Encomium could also be read as meaning "In praise of More". The double or triple meanings go on throughout the text.

The piece is filled with classical allusions delivered in a style typical of the learned humanists of the Renaissance. Folly parades as a goddess, offspring of Plutus, the god of wealth and a nymph, Youth. She was nursed by two other nymphs, Inebriation and Ignorance. Her faithful companions include Philautia (self-love), Kolakia (flattery), Lethe (forgetfulness), Misoponia (laziness), Hedone (pleasure), Anoia (dementia), Tryphe (wantonness), and two gods, Komos (intemperance) and Nigretos Hypnos (heavy sleep). Folly praises herself endlessly, arguing that life would be dull and distasteful without her. Of earthly existence, Folly pompously states, "you'll find nothing frolic or fortunate that it owes not to me."

Dante, Ockham, Eckhart cannot develop theme of folly—Erasmus’ Encomium Moriae raises folly again to metaphysical levels, a polemic against gloomy scholastic wisdom, humanist learning, and love of apatheia, while (the) hallmark of reality is folly, which includes everything beneath the mind and in which it is rooted, the whole splendor and vitality of life, love, and youth, and everything above the mind, all that is gratuitous, playful, graceful, the world of the gods—The Christian meaning of supra-rational folly is (Christ's) interpretation of evil on the Cross as not knowing what they do.

— Hans Urs von Balthasar (summarized), II.B.3.d. The Analogy of Folly, The Glory of the Lord Volume 5: The Realm of Metaphysics in the Modern Age

In one of the notable pivots in the Praise of Folly, the book turns out to be almost an elaborate sermon on 1 Corinthians 1:21-23, the folly on the cross.

Many subsequent commentators characterize the book only as a satire against the Roman Catholic church itself, or its doctrines, rather than about the moral decisions of humans regardless of lifestyle or state: the contrast between human wisdom which is actually folly and the divine folly which is wisdom.

== Translations and editions ==
From 1541, Latin editions frequently included Commentary of Girardus Listrius Listrius was helped by Erasmus to complete the commentary for Froben in 1515, and may have been a pseudonym for Erasmus. Erasmus made many small changes to Folly between editions.

As with several of Erasmus' works, translations often had interpolations and choices of a sectarian nature that did not reflect the original. It may be from these that the summary of the book as an "attack on the Western church" comes.

- Sir Thomas Chaloner (1548) The praise of folie. Moriæ encomium a booke made in latine by that great clerke Erasmus Roterodame. Englisshed by sir Thomas Chaloner knight.
- Charles Patin (1676)
- John Adams (1686)
- J. Wilford, publ. (< 1722)
- W. Kennet (1735) Moriae Encomium, or, the Praise of Folly. Made English from the Latin of Erasmus. (May be same as Wilford.)
- Unknown polemicist (1876) with start and end poems not by Erasmus. (May be a version of Kennet or Wilford.)
- Hoyt Hopewell Hudson (1941)
- Hendrik Willem Van Loon (1942)
- Harry Carter (1952)
- R.A. Adams (1989)
- Clarence Miller (2003)
- Betty Radice (2004)
- Charles Packard (2016) Folly on Folly: The Praise of Folly, a 1509 Latin prose Work, in rhymed English verse

=== Comparative texts ===
The Latin has "Moriae" (Folly) which is a pun and allusion to "Mariae", that Mary Magdalene had the best part (Mark 10:42). (Note: According to note 147 of Radice' translation.) Most English translations go directly to Mary here.

- Latin: "Primum igitur existimate, Platonem tale quiddam iam tum somniasse, cum, amantium furorem omnium felicissimum esse, scriberet. Etenim qui vehementer amat iam non in se vivit, sed in eo quod amat, quoque longius a se ipso digreditur, et in illud demigrat, hoc magis ac magis gaudet[...] Atque, haec est Moriae pars, quae non aufertur commutatione vitae, sed perficitur."
- Chaloner: "Fyrst therfore ye must thinke, that Plato didde evin then dreame of suche a thyng, whan he wrote, that the passion and extreme rage of feruent lovers was to be desired and embrased, as a thing above all others most blisfull: because that a vehement lover liveth not now in hym selfe, but rather in that that he loveth, so that the further & further a lovers hert is distraught from him selfe, to dwell with the beloved, the more and more he rejoyseth. [...] And this is Mary Magdalens porcion, whiche by chaunge of life shall not be plucked awaie, but rather be more perfitely confyrmed."
- unknown: "First, therefore, Plato dreamed somewhat of this nature when he tells us that the madness of lovers was of all other dispositions of the body most desirable; for he who is once thoroughly smitten with this passion, lives no longer within himself, but has removed his soul to the same place where he has settled his affections, and loses himself to find the object he so much dotes upon: this straying now, and wandering of a soul from its own mansion, what is it better than a plain transport of madness? [...] This likewise is that better part which Mary chose, which shall not be taken from her, but perfected and completed by her mortal putting on immortality."
- John Wilson: "And therefore suppose that Plato dreamed of somewhat like it when he called the madness of lovers the most happy condition of all others. For he that's violently in love lives not in his own body but in the thing he loves; and by how much the farther he runs from himself into another, by so much the greater is his pleasure. [...] And this is that Mary's better part which is not taken away by change of life, but perfected."

== Reception ==
Moriae Encomium was hugely popular, to Erasmus' astonishment and sometimes his dismay. Pope Leo X and Cardinal Cisneros are said to have found it amusing. Erasmus' close friends had been initially skeptical and warned him of possible dangers to himself of being seen as attacking the establishment.

Before Erasmus' death it had already passed into numerous editions and had been translated into Czech, French, and German. An English edition soon followed. It influenced the teaching of rhetoric during the later sixteenth century, and the art of adoxography or praise of worthless subjects became a popular exercise in Elizabethan grammar schools. A copy of the Basel edition of 1515/16 was illustrated with pen and ink drawings by Hans Holbein the Younger. These are the most famous illustrations of In Praise of Folly.

Its role in the beginnings of the Protestant Reformation stems from its supposed criticism of the practices of the Church and its political allies.

Erasmus subsequently wrote that he almost regretted writing it, such had been the trouble it had caused him. But this trouble did not come from the satirized princes, popes, bishops, abbots, cardinals, famous scholars, courtiers, magistrates or wives, but from certain theologians.

It has been called "a notoriously difficult text" to analyse.
