= Adoxography =

Refined writing on a trivial subject

Adoxography is elegant or refined writing that addresses a trivial or base subject. The term was coined in the late 19th century. It was a form of rhetorical exercise "in which the legitimate methods of the encomium are applied to persons or objects in themselves obviously unworthy of praise, as being trivial, ugly, useless, ridiculous, dangerous or vicious". Pease (1926) surveys this field from its origins with the defence of Helen ascribed to Gorgias, and cites De Quincey's "On Murder Considered as one of the Fine Arts" and Lewis Carroll's Through the Looking-Glass as modern examples. Pease suggests that the skill was taught in ancient Greece, where the matters known to have been praised included gout, blindness, deafness, old age, negligence, adultery, flies, gnats, bedbugs, smoke, and dung.

The art was rediscovered during the revival of rhetoric in the 16th century. Among the best known and most influential examples was Erasmus' Moriae Encomium or The Praise of Folly.

== Literary examples ==
The first English treatise on the subject was Anthony Munday's "The defence of contraries" (1593), a translation of Charles Estienne's "Paradoxes, ce sont propos contre la commune opinion" and based on Ortensio Landi's "Paradossi". It contained essays that praised, amongst other things, poverty, drunkenness and stupidity. Walter K. Olson, writing in the Leisure & Arts section of the September 8, 2005, edition of The Wall Street Journal, quotes the following passage from Sadakat Kadri, "The Trial: A History, from Socrates to O.J. Simpson": "Elizabethan schoolboys...were commonly taught adoxography, the art of eruditely praising worthless things." The passage comes in the course of an account of Sir Walter Raleigh's trial, and Kadri observes that Munday thought lawyers could particularly learn from his book. This was a period of English history when the jury trial was assuming its modern form, and Kadri later shows that the ability to praise apparently worthless causes has been central to courtroom advocacy for centuries. Celebrated adoxographers could therefore be said to include men such as Cicero and Clarence Darrow.

In modern writing, the term "adoxography" is also used as an often humorous self-reference in writing, often in regard to humor columns or blogs.

== See also ==
- Encomium
- Panegyric
- Epideictic
- Praise
- In Praise of Folly
