= Robin West =

American legal scholar

Robin L. West

Education
- Education: University of Maryland (JD), Stanford University (JSM), University of Maryland, Baltimore County (BA)

Philosophical work
- Era: Contemporary philosophy
- Institutions: Georgetown University Law Center
- Main interests: Philosophy of law, feminist legal theory, ethics of care
- Notable works: "Jurisprudence and Gender" (1988)

Robin West (born 1954) is the Frederick J. Haas Professor of Law and Philosophy emerita at the Georgetown University Law Center. West's research is primarily concerned with feminist legal theory, constitutional law and theory, philosophy of law, and the law and literature movement.

West holds a B.A. and a J.D. (1979) from the University of Maryland and a masters in judicial studies from Stanford. West came to Georgetown after teaching at the University of Maryland Law School from 1986 to 1991, and at the Cleveland-Marshall College of Law from 1982 to 1985.

West is best known for her work in the ethics of care and feminist legal theory. In her article "Jurisprudence and Gender," West argued that women’s socialisation prioritises connection and relationships over autonomy, making it difficult for them to respond to violence with violence, which ultimately hinders their ability to prove lack of consent in legal contexts designed by and for men.

== Selected works ==
=== Books ===
- West, Robin (1993). Narrative, authority, and law: law, meaning, and violence.
- West, Robin (1994). Progressive constitutionalism: reconstructing the Fourteenth Amendment.
- West, Robin (1997). Caring for justice.
- West, Robin (2000). Rights.
- West, Robin (2003). Re-imagining justice: progressive interpretations of formal equality, rights, and the rule of law.
- West, Robin (2011). Normative jurisprudence.

=== Journal articles ===
- West, Robin (Winter 1988). "Jurisprudence and gender". University of Chicago Law Review. 55 (1): 1–72. doi:10.2307/1599769. JSTOR 1599769.

See also: Nussbaum, Martha C. (Summer 2008). "Robin West, "Jurisprudence and Gender": defending a radical liberalism" (PDF). University of Chicago Law Review. 75 (3). University of Chicago Law School: 985–996. JSTOR 20141934. Archived from the original (PDF) on 2015-09-05.

- West, Robin (Spring 1989). "Love, rage and legal theory". Yale Journal of Law and Feminism. 1 (1). Yale Law School: 101–110.

== See also ==
- Robin West's contributions to the Law and Literature movement
