= Cluster criticism =

Method in rhetorical criticism

Cluster criticism, otherwise known as cluster analysis, is a method utilized in rhetorical criticism. This form of analysis was made famous by Kenneth Burke in which a critic attempts to unearth the hidden motive behind a text by focusing on the structural relations and associative meanings between certain main ideas, concepts, subjects or actions presented in a text. For example, what actions does a hero repeatedly take that showcase their valor

== Method ==
There are three steps in performing a cluster criticism: identifying key terms, creating clusters from associated elements, and examining and comparing clusters.

=== Identify Key Terms ===
First, key terms are identified. These are generally the ideas, subjects, topics, or arguments that work discusses. They usually (but not always) occur more often than any other element in the work; they can also be identified in a work's introduction.

=== Create Clusters from Associated Elements ===
Next, the critic identifies surrounding elements in the text that refer to or are associated with each of the key terms. Each collection of associated elements which refer to the same key term is called a cluster.

=== Examine and Compare Clusters ===
In the final step of the criticism, the critic examines how each specific cluster represents its referring key term. This process typically includes directly contrasting one cluster with another. By doing this, a critic can determine how a text privileges one key term over others.

This stage of cluster criticism can incorporate other methods in rhetorical criticism. For example, if different types of metaphors are found in different clusters, a critic can perform multiple metaphoric criticisms in order to show how each key term characterizes a particular position or entity.

== Example ==
The following is an excerpt from a speech titled "Americanism" given by Warren G. Harding in 1920 regarding aid to European nations devastated by World War I. Terms bolded are those a critic might associate with the key term "Old World stabilization" and terms underlined are those a critic might associate with the key term "stabilize America."

It's time to idealize, but it's very practical to make sure our own house is in perfect order before we attempt the miracle of Old World stabilization. Call it the selfishness of nationality if you will. I think it's an inspiration to patriotic devotion to safeguard America first, to stabilize America first, to prosper America first, to think of America first, to exalt America first, to live for and revere America first. Let the internationalist dream and the Bolshevist destroy.

In this example, the critic would examine the cluster of words and phrases around the key term "Old world stabilization" in order to find certain patterns. Terms like idealize, miracle, dream, and attempt depict reconstruction through aid as an unproven strategy; internationalist and Bolshevist characterize supporters of aid as foreign and Communist; and the ending word 'destroy' implies a disastrous consequence for the proposal. In all, a critic can assume that these clusters work together to present aid for European reconstruction as an irresponsible and un-American plan.

In stark contrast, the terms in the cluster around "stabilize America" construct a rejection of the proposal as the only responsible and American choice. Terms like make sure, think, practical, order, safeguard, live, and prosper construct a refusal of European reconstruction as safe and sensible. The words inspiration, exalt, and revere function with the phrases "patriotic devotion" and "selfishness of nationality" to characterize a refusal of aid as a positive, patriotic act. Finally, the repeated phrase "America first" dichotomizes the issue into a choice between placing America or Europe first, with no middle ground.

The conclusion of this cluster criticism would therefore be that Harding advances his argument by constructing European aid as an irresponsible and un-American policy and a rejection of aid as a responsible, pro-American policy as well as framing the issue as an irreconcilable choice between the interests of America and Europe.
