= Metaphoric criticism =

English figure of speech

Metaphoric criticism is one school of rhetorical analysis used in English and speech communication studies. Scholars employing metaphoric criticism analyze texts by locating metaphors within texts and evaluating those metaphors in an effort to better understand ways in which authors appeal to their audiences.

== Origins ==
The term "metaphor" can be traced to the trope described by Aristotle in both his Rhetoric and Poetics as a comparison of two dissimilar objects or concepts in an effort to relate one to the other. James DeMille, in The Elements of Rhetoric, defines metaphor as "an implied comparison between two things of unlike nature, for example, 'The colorful display was a magnet for anybody in the room.'" Using DeMille's example, a critic studying metaphor would explore how normally "display" and "magnet" are not considered synonyms. However, in using "magnet" as a metaphor, the above sentence implies that the "display" possess properties of a magnet and draws objects—or, in this case, people—in the room toward it.

In a broader sense, metaphoric criticism can illuminate the world in which we live by analyzing the language—and, in particular, the metaphors—that surround us. The notion that metaphors demonstrate worldviews originates in the work of Kenneth Burke and has been taken up further in the cognitive sciences, particularly by George Lakoff.

== Application ==
Metaphoric criticism focuses on analysis of texts that use metaphors effectively or ineffectively as part of their argument structure. For example, in an article entitled "Five Years After 9/11: Drop the War Metaphor," George Lakoff and Evan Frisch analyze how President Bush's adoption of a "war" metaphor in order to discuss his approach to dealing with terrorism as opposed to a "crime" metaphor provides a barrier from critics for him to move forward with the War in Iraq. Lakoff illustrates the power of the "war" metaphor: "The war metaphor defined war as the only way to defend the nation. From within the war metaphor, being against war as a response was to be unpatriotic, to be against defending the nation. The war metaphor put progressives on the defensive."" Rhetorical critics would not only make these observations in their own criticism, but would also relate to the effect on the audience, and how the metaphor either enhances or challenges the audience’s worldview.

Critics examining metaphor have in recent years also started to examine metaphor in visual and electronic media. For example, metaphors can be found in rhetorical presidential television ads. In 1984, President Ronald Reagan’s campaign sponsored a commercial showing a grizzly bear as posing a potentially large threat to the United States. The USSR is never named in that ad, however the assumption of the campaign was that Americans would clearly recognize the "enemy" that the bear represents.

== Conduction ==
In Rhetorical Criticism, Sonja K. Foss outlines a four-step procedure for applying metaphoric criticism to texts:

1. First, the critic reads or views the entire artifact with specific attention to its context.
2. Second, to the critic isolates the metaphor(s) within the text, both obvious and more subtle substitutions of meaning. Here Foss invokes Max Black's interaction theory of "tenor" (the principal subject or focus) and "vehicle" (secondary subject or frame for the metaphor), a method to analyze ways in which the related dissimilar objects actually share similar characteristics.
3. Third, the critic sorts the metaphors and looks for patterns of use within the text. The more comprehensive the text, the longer this step will take.
4. The critic analyzes the metaphor(s) or groups of metaphors in the artifact to reveal how their structure may affect the intended audience. Foss writes, "Here, the critic suggests what effects the use of the various metaphors may have on the audience and how the metaphors function to argue for a particular attitude toward the ideas presented."
