= Richard H. Weisberg =

Richard H. Weisberg is a professor emeritus of constitutional law at the Cardozo School of Law at Yeshiva University in New York City, and a leading scholar on law and literature. He was a Distinguished Visiting Professor of Law at the University of Pittsburgh School of Law for four years and currently teaches at Carnegie Mellon University as a Distinguished Visiting Professor of Law and Literature.

== Biography ==
Weisberg received his B.A. degree from Brandeis University in 1965, Ph.D. degree from Cornell University in 1970, and J.D. degree from Columbia University in 1974.

He has written many articles and books on law and literature, including The Failure of the Word: The Protagonist as Lawyer in Modern Fiction, When Lawyers Write, and Poethics: and Other Strategies of Law and Literature. His other books are Vichy Law and the Holocaust in France and In Praise of Intransigence: The Perils of Flexibility. He was a Guggenheim Fellow and a recipient of the France's Legion of Honor in 2008.

On October 23, 2014, Weisberg was named by President Barack Obama to the Commission for the Preservation of America’s Heritage Abroad.
