= Ideological criticism =

Ideological criticism is a method in rhetorical criticism that seeks to reveal the dominant ideologies expressed by a text and the opposing or contrary ideologies silenced by the text. It was started by a group of scholars roughly in the late-1970s through the mid-1980s at universities in the United States. Leading scholars of ideological criticism were Michael Calvin McGee at the University of Iowa and Phillip Wander at San Jose State University. Wander's 1983 article, "The Ideological Turn in Modern Criticism," and his 1984 article, "The Third Persona: An Ideological Turn in Rhetorical Theory," remain two of the most important articles in the field. According to Sonja Foss, “the primary goal of the ideological critic is to discover and make visible the dominant ideology or ideologies embedded in an artifact and the ideologies that are being muted in it.” Foss has also mentioned the contribution to ideological criticism of several theoretical schools, including Marxism, structuralism, cultural studies, and postmodernism.

== Ideograph ==
The ideograph is a unit of analysis in ideological criticism. It is a symbol representing an ideological concept that may be ordinary on its own, but is understood to have a particular meaning to certain groups of people. Sonja Foss, a rhetorical scholar, has defined the ideograph as "traces of ideology in an artifact". Michael Calvin McGee, an ideological critic, postulated that an “ideograph is an ordinary term found in political discourse” that “is a high-order abstraction representing collective commitment to a particular but equivocal and ill-defined normative goal”. Thus, McGee restricted ideographs to words that “constitute a vocabulary of public motives, which authorize and warrant public actions”. McGee encourages the study of ideographs (such as “liberty” and “freedom”) to help identify the ideological position of a society. He argues such terms are used in discourse as a means of justifying problematic issues within a society.

The meaning of an ideograph is defined by a society and its culture and can change over time. For example, In the United States, the ideograph of freedom has changed. At the time of the American revolution (1775–1783), freedom was understood as liberation, specifically from Great Britain's rule. This is known as “negative liberty”. In the modern day, freedom is frequently understood as the ability to do something without restriction, otherwise known as “positive liberty”. Depending on one's ideological orientation, the ideograph of freedom represents many things.

Ideographs can be both positive and negative in nature, and can “guide behavior and belief negatively by branding unacceptable behavior." McGee notes that to fully understand ideographs, they must be examined both “diachronically” as well as “synchronically.” That is, ideographs need to be examined across time to determine how their meanings may have changed and all ideographs that are used in a given situation must be considered.

Ideographs can be both verbal and be visual. In 1997, Janis Edwards and Carol Winkler expanded the idea of the ideograph to include visual images as well as written words. They argue images can act as “a Visual reference point that forms the basis of arguments about a variety of themes and subjects” that are used by both “elites and non-elites” alike. Like McGee's textual ideographs, visual ideographs depict common values and goals in a given culture, reoccur in different contexts over time, and are used to validate arguments and social practices. Edwards and Winkler have stated that images of people can act as ideographs too. “In their construct, a person (character) is abstracted and elevated to the status of a cultural figure, and becomes a surface for the articulation of the political character, employing cultural ideals”.

Foss identifies the following steps in a piece of ideological criticism: (1) “formulate a research question and select an artifact”; (2) “select a unit of analysis” (which she calls “traces of ideology in an artifact”); (3) “analyze the artifact” (which, according to Foss, involves identifying the ideology in the artifact, analyzing the interests the ideology serves, and uncovering the strategies used in the artifact to promote the ideology); and (4) “write the critical essay”.
