= Aimee Bahng =

American academic

- Occupation: Academic

Academic background
- Education: Princeton University; Middlebury College; University of California, San Diego

Aimee Bahng is an American academic. She is a professor of gender and women's studies at Pomona College in Claremont, California. Her previous denial of tenure at Dartmouth College sparked widespread protests about discrimination against racial minorities in academia.

== Early life and education ==
Bahng received her bachelor's degree at Princeton University, then completed a master's degree at Middlebury College and a doctorate at the University of California, San Diego.

== Career ==
Bahng taught at Dartmouth College. Her denial of tenure there sparked widespread protests about discrimination against racial minorities in academia.

In 2017, she was hired at Pomona College as an assistant professor in the gender and women's studies department.

== Research ==
Bahng's research interests include Asian-American speculative fiction and the writer Octavia Butler.

== Books ==
- Migrant Futures: Decolonizing Speculation in Financial Times. Durham, North Carolina: Duke University Press. 2018. ISBN 978-0-8223-7301-8.
