= Karma Chávez =

American academic

Karma R. Chávez is a rhetorical critic who utilizes textual and field-based methods and studies the rhetorical practices of people marginalized within existing power structures. She has published numerous scholarly articles and books, including Queer Migration Politics: Activist Rhetoric and Coalitional Possibilities, as well as co-founding the Queer Migration Research Network. She works with social justice organizations and her scholarship is informed by queer of color theory, women of color feminism, poststructuralism, and cultural studies.

Chávez is currently Bobby and Sherri Patton Professor and Chair of the Department of Mexican American and Latino Studies at the University of Texas at Austin. She previously worked at the University of Wisconsin–Madison in the Department of Communication Arts. For four years in Madison, she hosted a radio show on 89.9 FM WORT called "A Public Affair." She is also a member of the radical queer collective Against Equality, with Yasmin Nair and Ryan Conrad.

== Scholarly work ==
Chávez's work focuses primarily on social movement building, activist rhetoric, and coalitional politics.

=== Books ===
- Chávez, Karma R. Queer Migration Politics: Activist Rhetoric and Coalitional Possibilities. Urbana: University of Illinois Press, 2013.
- Chávez, Karma R. Palestine on the Air. Urbana: University of Illinois Press, 2019.
- Chávez, Karma R. The Borders of AIDS: Race, Quarantine, and Resistance. Seattle: University of Washington Press, 2021.

==== Edited volumes and special issues ====
- Feminist Keywords Collective (Tompkins, Kyla, Aren Aizura, Aimee Bahng, Karma R. Chávez, Mishuana Goeman, and Amber Musser), eds. Keywords for Gender and Sexuality Studies. New York: New York University Press, 2021.
- Luibhéid, Eithne and Karma R. Chávez, eds. Queer and Trans Migrations: Dynamics of Detention, Deportation, and Illegalization. Urbana: University of Illinois Press, 2020.
- Chávez, Karma R., ed. Forum: “Sanctuary,” Departures in Critical Qualitative Research, 2020.
- Hill, Annie and Karma R. Chávez, eds. Forum: “Queer Migration Studies and Critical Trafficking Studies,” Women’s Studies in Communication 41.4 (2018): 299–338.
- McKinnon, Sara L., Robert Asen, Karma R. Chávez and Robert Glenn Howard, eds. Text + Field: Innovations in Rhetorical Method. State College: Penn State University Press, 2016.
- Chávez, Karma R., ed. Special Issue: “Out of Bounds? Queer Intercultural Studies.” Journal of International and Intercultural Communication 6.2 (2013): 83–162.
- Chávez, Karma R. and Cindy L. Griffin, eds. Standing in the Intersection: Feminist Voices, Feminist Practices in Communication Studies. Albany: State University of New York Press, 2012.
- McKinnon, Sara L. and Karma R. Chávez, eds. Special Issue: “On Hospitality.” Liminalities: A Journal of Performance Studies 5.5 (2009): <http://liminalities.net> [2 audio essays and 9 essays totaling 130 pages]
- Griffin, Cindy L. and Karma R. Chávez, eds. Special Issue: “Power Feminism: Exploring Agency, Oppression and Victimage.” Women's Studies in Communication 32.1 (2009): 2–125.

== Contributions and recognition ==
Chávez is the co-founder of the Queer Migration Research Network, which is an interdisciplinary initiative that examines how migration processes fuel the production, contestation, and remaking of sexual and gender norms, cultures, communities, and politics. She is also a former organizer for LGBT Books to Prisoners.

Chávez has received multiple awards and honors, including Book of the Year in 2014 from the GLBT Studies Division of the National Communication Association (NCA) and NCA's 2022 Diamond Anniversary Book Award. Additionally, NCA's Latino Studies Division named her the 2015 Puchot-Córdova Scholar of the Year, and she won the 2015 Lambda Award for LGBTQ Advocacy from NCA's Caucus on LGBTQ Concerns. Her co-edited volume, Standing in the Intersection: Feminist Voices, Feminist Practices in Communication Studies, was selected as Best Edited Book by the Organization for the Study of Communication, Language, and Gender in 2013. Chávez also won NCA's Karl R. Wallace Memorial Award in 2013 and its Douglas W. Ehninger Distinguished Rhetorical Scholar Award in 2023.

== See also ==
- Queer Migration
- Rhetoric
- Social movement
- Coalition
- Field Methods
