= Condensation symbol =

Phrase which conjures a specific image

A condensation symbol is "a name, word, phrase, or maxim which stirs vivid impressions involving the listener's most basic values and readies the listener for action," as defined by political scientist Doris Graber. Short words or phrases such as "my country," "Old Glory" "American Dream," "family values," are all condensation symbols because they conjure a specific image within the listener and carry "intense emotional and effective power." Often used to further the meaning of a symbol or phrase, the condensation symbol has a semantic meaning, but through long-term use, it has acquired other connotations that further its symbolic meaning.

== Characteristics ==
Doris Graber identified three main characteristics of condensation symbols, as they:

1. Have the tendency to evoke rich and vivid images in an audience.
2. Possess the capacity to arouse emotions.
3. Supply instant categorizations and evaluations.

Considering the phrase "American Dream," the image that tends to come to mind is a successful, self-made American individual who has worked hard in order to obtain a life of financial security, with occasional luxury and minimal privilege, even if the sociological reality varies widely by region, class, place, and time. A closely related concept is the rhetorical concept of the ideograph.

== Emergence of the term ==
With origins in psychology, sociology, and semiotic research, a condensation symbol is "a single symbol that represents multiple emotions, ideas, feelings, memories, or impulses”. Sigmund Freud first defined condensation in dreams as "fusing several different elements into one." When a listener hears a phrase that is meant to conjure a specific image, their mind should immediately turn to the image that is associated with the phrase, and feel the intended emotion the speaker wishes to present.

Edward Sapir later applied the term to linguistics along with his principle of linguistic relativity, which holds that "the structure of language affects the ways in which its speakers conceptualize the world". Sapir, a linguistic anthropologist, gave specificity to the term when stating that "condensation symbols designate no clear referent but serve to 'condense' into one symbol a host of different meanings and connotations which might diverge if more specific referents were attempted." He also posited the condensation symbol as an unconscious release of emotional tension.

Within the field of rhetorical criticism, David Kaufer and Kathleen Carley discuss condensation symbols and their function within political discourse. They describe each condensation symbol as a term "well-connected in its context of meaning". Their paper attempts to prescribe a mathematical relationship between condensation symbols and their rhetorical influence. The authors devise six categories (buzzwords, pregnant place-holders, emblems, standard symbols, allusions, and stereotypes) to determine which held the highest rhetorical taxonomy. They concluded by assuming that "connectivity" by various means allows the arguer to conjure emotional symbols in associational patterns through these six devices. The authors also state that condensation symbols “allow group members to compress their image of the problem at the heart of the issue and solutions to it—-often so thoroughly that their decisions about how to decide an issue frequently collapse about how to name it.”

== Sources ==
- Graber, Doris (1976). Verbal Behavior and Politics. Urbana: University of Illinois Press. ISBN 978-0252002625.
- Jasinski, James (2001). "Condensation Symbol". Sourcebook on Rhetoric. Thousand Oaks: SAGE. pp. 97–100. doi:10.4135/9781452233222.n23. ISBN 978-0-7619-0504-2. Accessed May 2025.
- Kaufer, David S.; Carley, Kathleen M. (1993). "Condensation Symbols: Their Variety and Rhetorical Function in Political Discourse". Philosophy & Rhetoric. 26 (3). Penn State University Press: 201–226. JSTOR 40237768.
- Palczewski, Catherine Helen; Ice, Richard; Fritch, John (2012). Rhetoric in Civic Life (1st ed.). State College: Strata Publishing. ISBN 978-1891136283.
- Sapir, Edward (1934). "Symbolism". Encyclopedia of the social sciences. Vol. XIII. New York: Macmillan. pp. 492–495.
- Sigmund Freud. Encyclopædia Britannica Online Academic Edition. 2013.
