= Law and literature =

The law and literature movement focuses on connections between law and literature. This field has roots in two developments in the intellectual history of law—first, the growing doubt about whether law in isolation is a source of value and meaning, or whether it must be plugged into a large cultural or philosophical or social-science context to give it value and meaning; and, second, the growing focus on the mutability of meaning in all texts, whether literary or legal. Work in the field comprises two complementary perspectives: Law in literature (understanding issues as they are explored in literary texts, thus studying law portrayed in literature) and law as literature (understanding legal texts with literary interpretation, analysis, and critique, therefore examining law as literature to be understood).

== History of the movement ==
James Boyd White's The Legal Imagination (1973) is often credited with initiating the law and literature movement. It is a fusion of anthology and critique, drawing on a range of sources, with headnotes and questions on the relationship of legal texts to literary analysis, and literary texts to the legal issues that they explore. Proponents of the "law-in-literature" theory, such as Richard Weisberg and Robert Weisberg, believe that literary works, especially narratives centered on a legal conflict, offer lawyers and judges insight into the "nature of law". This perspective examines and interprets legal texts using the techniques of literary critics. Scholars such as White and Ronald Dworkin apply law as literature, because they maintain that the meaning of legal texts, such as written law, like any other genre of literature, can be discovered only through interpretation. These matters are contentious, with ties to judicial interpretation of the law in its different methods.

Founded in 1988, the Law and Literature Journal, originally published as Cardozo Studies in Law and Literature, claims to be the premier journal of the movement.

Beginning in 2019, Oxford University Press began publishing a book series called Law and Literature.

== Critics ==
Richard Posner, of the law and economics movement, wrote Law and Literature: A Misunderstood Relationship, a highly critical attack against the law and literature movement and especially against the writings of Robin West. He described West's analysis of literature in legal debate as "particularly eccentric".

Richard Delgado and Jean Stefancic, legal academics who are contributors to critical race theory, have argued against White, and his theory of some celebrated legal cases in U.S. history. They agree with Posner on several issues. According to Delgado and Stefancic, the moral position of judges is determined by normative social and political forces rather than by literature.
