= Lionel Cantú =

Sociology scholar (1965–2002)

- His photoshoot
- Born: October 7, 1965; San Antonio, Texas
- Died: May 26, 2002 (aged 36)
- Education: UT San Antonio (BA); UC Irvine (MA, PhD)
- Occupation: Teacher

Lionel Cantú Jr. (October 7, 1965 – May 26, 2002), was an assistant professor of sociology at the University of California, Santa Cruz, who focused on queer theory, queer issues, and Latin American immigration. His groundbreaking dissertation, The Sexuality of Migration: Border Crossings and Mexican Immigrant Men, which was edited, compiled, and published posthumously, focuses on the experiences of Mexican-queer migrants.

== Early years ==
Lionel Cantú Jr. was born in San Antonio, Texas, to parents Lionel and Rosario Cantú. He was one four siblings: two sisters, Rose Louise and Rachel Diane; and one brother, Charles. As a San Antonio native, Cantú attended the University of Texas at San Antonio and graduated with a Bachelor's in Psychology and Spanish in 1991. He continued his education at the University of California, Irvine, where he held the title of co-chair of the university's Lesbian and Gay Faculty/Staff network for nearly six years, while also founding a speaker series on sexuality-related topics called, the Lilac Collective. In 1998, Cantú was named University of California, Irvine's Lauds and Laurels Outstanding Graduate Student, and earned his Master's and Doctoral degrees in social science with a focus on social relations and feminist studies in 1999. Later that year, he became an assistant professor in sociology at the University of California, Santa Cruz, and also received a UC President's Doctoral Fellowship to become a University of California, Davis postdoctoral researcher studying “how American gay culture was becoming globalized and commodified.”

== Research ==
Much of Dr. Lionel Cantú's literary work focused on queer issues, migrant issues, race and ethnicity, and U. S. Latinos. His high regard among sociologists, however, is a result of his extensive research on how and when issues of sexuality and migration intersect. Cantú's dissertation, Border Crossings: Mexican Men and the Sexuality of Migration, is an example of how he explored the relatively new area of research, which concerns Mexican men who have sex with men and how their sexual identity alters in multiple cultural settings. His book of a similar title, The Sexuality of Migration: Border Crossings and Mexican Immigrant Men, was published posthumously in 2009 by New York University Press, and was compiled and edited by Nancy A. Naples and Salvador Vidal-Ortiz. Cantu et al. take up the issue of the relationship of homosexuals to immigration policies and nationalist discourse in his essay, “Well Founded Fear, Political Asylum and the Boundaries of Sexual Identity in the US-Mexico Borderlands.” In particular, Cantu discussed the complex performance of sexuality, gender and race expected from gay asylum seekers, thus reinforcing the conventional notions of gender and sexuality in a transnational crossroad that facilitates movement of commodities, cultures and people. He discussed how the US asylum system and nationalist discourse problematize the transnational intersections of race, gender and sexuality because,“The asylum system was generating new, essentializing constructions of sexuality that functioned within strictly nationalist logics, thereby re-inscribing borders that globalization had blurred” (301).

=== "De Ambiente: Queer Tourism and Shifting Boundaries of Mexican Male Sexualities" ===
In the article “De Ambiente: Queer Tourism and Shifting Boundaries of Mexican Male Sexualities,” published in 2002, Cantú uses oral histories from individuals involved in the queer travel industry to discusses the themes of otherness, boundaries, and political economies in relation to sexual identities among Mexican men. He utilizes the example of a new national project based on Gay and Lesbian tourism in Mexico to argue that, modernization, industrialization, and urbanization have created queer spaces of legitimacy and a commodified gay presence. While providing an overview of the economic ties between the U.S. and Mexico, which he argues to be largely influenced by NAFTA and the actions of the PRI political party, Cantú discusses other major themes such as western queer imaginaries, sexual norms, and neocolonialism. The article later goes on to analyze the relationship Queer Tourism has with economic links of power. Through his discussion of Queer tourism, Cantú interrogates gender norms using ethnographic methodologies. Cantu Jr.’s ethnographic evidence examines sexual colonization and transmigration between Mexico and the U.S. The article focuses on researching the dynamic status of Queer attitudes and identities reflected by national projects of modernity in Mexico. Cantu uses different reflections on perceived sexual imaginaries occupying Mexico, creating an analysis of shifting transnational attitudes.

=== Queer Migrations: Sexuality, U.S. Citizenship, and Border Crossings ===
Lionel Cantú Jr. is the co-editor of the 2005 book Queer Migrations: Sexuality, U.S. Citizenship, and Border Crossings. In Queer Migrations, Cantú Jr., Luibheid, and their scholarly contributors deal with queer immigration studies and questions of legitimacy. The book aims to provide documentation of the influence sexuality and queer identities have on transmigration. Cantu Jr., Luibheid, and some of their contributors use ethnographic methodologies to discuss the experiences of queer immigrants of color. The book includes an analysis of citizenship and the documentation process in relation to queer immigrants of color. Queer Migrations uses anthropological approaches to discuss queer sexual identities and transmigration. Cantu, Luibheid, and some contributors also use oral histories of gay and lesbian trans migrants to document marginalization within the migration process. The testimonies collected by the authors document the marginalization apparent at border locations within the U.S. Queer Migrations documents multiple examples of exploitation, marginalization, and sexualization revolving around U.S. border structural institutions.

== Death ==
Following hospitalization and surgery to attend to a ruptured lower intestine, Dr. Lionel Cantú died unexpectedly of cardiac arrest on May 26, 2002. Cantú is survived by his life partner, Hernando Molinares of Santa Cruz, California and his parents, two sisters, and one brother. Two days after his death, family, friends, and colleagues crowded into a “standing room only” memorial service to remember Cantú at the Vintage Faith Church in Santa Cruz, California, the largest church in the city. On June 3, 2004, the UC Santa Cruz Gay Lesbian Bisexual Transgender Intersex Resource Center was renamed in his honor to The Lionel Cantú Gay Lesbian Bisexual Transgender Intersex Resource Center. After Cantú's death, students and faculty from various areas of study formed the Lionel Cantú working group, in efforts to finish the projects that were in progress during the final moments of the scholar's life. With the help of Nancy Naples and other members of the group such as Salvador Vidal-Ortiz, Patricia Zavella, Craig Reinarman, Olga Nájara-Ramírez, and Sarita Gaytan, Cantú's most profound work became published, including his book, The Sexuality of Migration: Border Crossings and Mexican Immigrant Men.
