= Lisa A. Flores =

American rhetorical critic

Lisa Angela Flores (born 1965) is a rhetorical critic specializing in border rhetorics, Chicana feminist rhetoric, and racial rhetorical criticism. Flores is currently Josephine Berry Weiss Chair of the Humanities and professor of Communication Arts and Sciences and Women’s, Gender, and Sexuality Studies at Pennsylvania State University. Flores named and developed the approach to rhetorical criticism known as racial rhetorical criticism. Racial rhetorical criticism has become an influential framework in rhetorical and communication studies and was the subject of a forum dedicated to the issue published in the journal of Communication and Critical/Cultural Studies.

In 2021, Flores received the Rhetoric Society of America's Book Award for Deportable and Disposable: Public Rhetoric and the Making of the ‘Illegal’ Immigrant. This book award recognizes "exemplary work in rhetorical studies." Deportable and Disposable also won both the Diamond Anniversary Book Award and the James A. Winans-Herbert A. Wichelns Memorial Award for Distinguished Scholarship in Rhetoric and Public Address from the National Communication Association.

== Scholarly work ==
=== Books ===
- Deportable and Disposable: Public Rhetoric and the Making of the ‘Illegal’ Immigrant. Penn State Press, 2020.

=== Journal articles ===
- “Between Abundance and Marginalization: The Imperative of Racial Rhetorical Criticism.” Rhetoric Review, vol. 16, no. 1, 2016, pp. 4-24. https://doi.org/10.1080/15358593.2016.1183871.
- “Creating Discursive Space through a Rhetoric of Difference: Chicana Feminists Craft a Homeland.” Quarterly Journal of Speech, vol. 82, no. 2, 1996, pp. 142–56. https://doi.org/10.1080/00335639609384147.
- “Stoppage and the Racialized Rhetorics of Mobility.” Western Journal of Communication, vol. 84, no. 3, 2019, pp. 247–63. https://doi.org/10.1080/10570314.2019.1676914.
