= Robert L. Scott =

American scholar and professor

Robert Lee Scott (April 19, 1928 – July 26, 2018) was an American scholar influential in the study of rhetorical theory, criticism of public address, debate, and communication research and practice. He was professor emeritus in the Communication Studies Department at the University of Minnesota. He is the author of five books, numerous articles in speech, communications, philosophy, and rhetoric journals, and contributed many book chapters. His article "On Viewing Rhetoric As Epistemic", is considered one of the most important academic articles written in rhetorical studies in the past century.

== Personal life ==
Scott was born in Fairbury, Nebraska. He was the youngest of four children born to Walter and Anna Scott. His father was an educator, superintendent of schools and founder of Fairbury Community College, now Southeast Community College. He married Betty Rose Foust on September 13, 1947. They had three children, Mark Allen, Janet Lee, and Paul Matthew.

Scott served in the United States Marine Corps from June 1945 to August 1946. He received an Honorable discharge.

== Education ==
Scott graduated from Fairbury High School and earned his undergraduate degree at Colorado State College of Education now University of Northern Colorado where he majored in English. He earned his master's degree (1951) in speech at the University of Nebraska and Ph.D. (1955) in speech at the University of Illinois. Scott was the debate coach at the University of Houston, 1953–1957, and University of Minnesota, 1957–1964.

== Academic administration ==
Scott was an assistant professor at the University of Houston from 1953 until 1957, when he took an assistant professor position at the University of Minnesota in speech communication, where he taught until 1998. During his time in the department he was department chair from 1971 to 1989, director of graduate study 1961–1971 and 1990–1996. He also served as department chair for Spanish and Portuguese 1992-1994, and director, School of Journalism and Mass Communication 1995-1997. Scott also served on numerous all-university, College of Liberal Arts and graduate school committees.

== Professional memberships ==
- National Communication Association
- International Communication Association
- International Society for the History of Rhetoric
- Rhetoric Society of America
- Central States Communication Association
- Western Communication Association
- American Association of University Professors
- Kenneth Burke Society

== Editorial work ==
- Quarterly Journal of Speech, editor, 1972–74; editorial board, 1969–71, 1986–89
- Philosophy and Rhetoric, editorial board, 1974–97.
- Pre-Text: an Interdisciplinary Journal of Rhetoric, editorial board, 1981–89.
- Central States Speech Journal, editorial board, 1967–69.
- Argumentation and Advocacy, editorial board, 1989–92.

== Research ==
Scott published highly influential work on rhetorical theory and criticism. His most famous article, “On Viewing Rhetoric As Epistemic,” became one of the most important academic articles written in rhetorical studies in the past century.

Drawing inspiration from the ancient Sophists and Stephen Toulmin, and others, Scott argued that the traditional understanding of rhetoric as an art merely for making the Truth effective was inadequate. If we acknowledge that truth is probable and contingent, then it follows that rhetoric is a central art for finding our way. Scott argued that we should “consider truth not as something fixed and final but as something to be created moment by moment” in the circumstances in which we find ourselves and with which we must cope. Humans may plot our course by fixed stars but we do not possess those stars; we proceed, more or less effectively, on our course. Furthermore, humanity has learned that the stars are fixed only in a relative sense. In human affairs, then, “rhetoric is a way of knowing; it is epistemic.” In 1978, Michael Leff noted that “rhetoric is epistemic” marked the dominant trend in contemporary rhetorical theorizing.

In his 2004 essay "What do you mean, Rhetoric is Epistemic?" William D. Harpine revisited Scott's theory and questioned whether there can be a clear line between what Scott refers to as subjectively certain and objectively certain; he also indicated that Scott's most important contributions were probably related to ethics rather than epistemology. He stated that because of Scott's emphasis on uncertainty, we are encouraged to tolerate other people's opinions, and to recognize our own human limitations. Harpine contended that regardless of whether or not we determine that rhetoric is capable of producing knowledge, the ethical implications of Scott's work remain relevant.

== Recognition ==
- James A. Winans Awards for Outstanding Scholarship in Rhetoric and Public Address, Speech Communication Association national convention, 1970.
- Distinguished Teaching from the Alumni Association of the College of Liberal Arts and the University College of the University of Minnesota, 1981.
- Charles H. Woolbert Award for Research of Exceptional Originality and Influence from the Speech Communication Association, national convention, 1981. (The first Woolbert Award made.)
- Recognized by the Speech Association of Minnesota for Outstanding Contributions to Minnesota Education, Speech Communication and Theater Arts, 1984.
- Douglas Ehninger Distinguished Rhetorical Scholar Award from the Speech Communication Association, national convention, 1989.
- One of ten persons recognized by the Speech Communication Association in 1992 as charter members of "Distinguished Scholars" for "a distinguished career in the study of communication."
- The Wallace Bacon award for a Career of Outstanding Teaching, 2005, National Communication Association.
- Distinguished Scholar Award, National Communication Association

== Books ==
- With Otis M. Walter, Thinking and Speaking, A Guide to Intelligent Oral Communication (New York: Macmillan, lst edn., 1962; 5th edn., 1985).
- Editor, The Speaker's Reader: Concepts in Speech-Communication (Glenview, Illinois: Scott, Foresman, 1969).
- With Wayne Brockriede, The Rhetoric of Black Power (New York: Harper and Row, 1969).
- With Wayne Brockriede, Moments in the Rhetoric of the Cold War (New York: Random House, 1970).
- With Bernard L. Brock edited, Methods of Rhetorical Criticism First Edition (New York: Harper and Row, 1972. Second Edition, Detroit, Michigan: Wayne State University Press, 1980).

== Periodicals and book chapters ==
- "A Philosophy of Discussion: 1954." Southern Speech Journal, 19 (March 1954), 241–9.
- "On the Meaning of the Term 'Prima-Facie' in Argumentation.
- Central States Speech Journal, 12 (Autumn 1960), 33-7.
- With Donald K. Smith. "Motivation Theory in Teaching Persuasion." Quarterly Journal of Speech, 47 (Dec. 1961), 378–83.
- "The Problem of the Prima-Facie Case." Speaker and Gavel, 1 (March 1964), 81–4.
- "Some Implications of Existentialism for Rhetoric." Central States Speech Journal, 15 (Nov. 1964), 267–78.
- "On Viewing Rhetoric as Epistemic." Central States Speech Journal, 18 (Feb. 1967), 9–17.
- "A Fresh Attitude toward Rationalism." Speech Teacher, 17 (Mar. 1968), 134–39.
- "A Rhetoric of Facts: Arthur Larson's Stance as a Persuader." Speech Monographs, 35 (June 1968), 109–21.
- With Wayne Brockriede. "Stokely Carmichael: Two Speeches on Black Power." Central States Speech Journal, 19 (Spring 1968), 3–13.
- "Justifying Violence--The Rhetoric of Militant Black Power." Central States Speech Journal, 19 (Summer 1968), 96–104.
- With Donald K. Smith. "The Rhetoric of Confrontation." Quarterly Journal of Speech, 55 (Feb. 1969), 1–8.
- "Rhetoric that Postures: An Intrinsic Reading of Richard Nixon's Inaugural Address." Western Speech, 34 (Winter 1970), 21–34.
- "James Baldwin's Another Country: Some Roots of Black Power." Journal of Black Studies, 1 (Sept. 1970), 21–34.
- "Rhetoric and Silence." Western Speech, 36 (Summer 1972), 146–5.
- "On Not Defining 'Rhetoric'." Philosophy and Rhetoric, 6 (Spring 1973), 81–96.
- "The Conservative Voice in Radical Rhetoric: A Common Response to Division." Speech Monographs, 40 (June 1973), 123–35.
- "A Synoptic View of Systems of Western Rhetoric." Quarterly Journal of Speech, 61 (Dec. 1975), 239–47.
- "Dialogue and Rhetoric." In Rhetoric and Communication, ed. Jane Blankenship and Herman Stelzner. Univ. of Illinois Press, 1976, pp. 99–109.
- "Rhetoric as Epistemic: Ten Years Later." Central States Speech Journal, 27 (Dec. 1976), 258–66.
- "Diego Rivera at Rockefeller Center: Fresco Painting and Rhetoric." Western Speech Communication Journal. 41 (Spring 1977), 70–82.
- "Communication as an Intentional, Social System." Human Communication Research, 3 (Spring 1977), 258–68.
- "Evidence in Communication Research: We Are Such Stuff." Western Speech Communication Journal, 42 (Winter 1978), 29–36.
- "Response to Higgins." In Perspectives on Literacy: Proceedings of the 1977 Conference. Ed. Richard Beach and P. D. Pearson. Univ. of Minnesota College of Education, 1978, pp. 153–9.
- "Maintaining a Human Scale in Communication." The Speech Association of Minnesota Journal, 5 (Spring 1978), 10–19. (Speech delivered at the St. Olaf College, Northfield, MN, as a part of the dedication of a new Speech/Theatre Building.)
- "Personal and Institutional Problems Encountered in Being Interdisciplinary," in Interdisciplinarity and Higher Education, ed. Joseph J. Kockelmans, University Park, PA: Pennsylvania State University Press, 1979, pp. 306–327.
- "Intentionality in the Process of Rhetoric." Rhetoric in Transition, ed. Eugene E. White. University Park, PA: Pennsylvania State University Press, 1980, pp. 39–60.
- "You Cannot Not Debate: The Debate over the 1980 Presidential Debates." Speaker and Gavel. 18 (Winter 1981), 28–33.
- "The Tacit Dimension and Rhetoric: What It Means to Persuade and to Be Persuaded." Pre/Text, An Inter-Disciplinary Journal of Rhetoric. 2 (1981), 115–26.
- "Can a New Rhetoric Be Epistemic?" in The Jensen Lectures: Contemporary Communication Studies, ed. John I Sisco. Tampa, Florida: Dept. of Communication, Univ. of South Florida, 1983, pp. 1–22.
- "Reading the History of Rhetoric." The Pennsylvania Speech Communication Annual, 39 (1983), 33–38.
- "Narrative Theory and Communication Research." Quarterly Journal of Speech. 70, no. 1 (May 1983), 197–204.
- With James F. Klumpp. "A Dear Searcher into Comparison: The Rhetoric of Ellen Goodman." Quarterly Journal of Speech. 70 (Feb. 1984), 69–79.
- "Focusing Rhetorical Criticism." Communication Education. 33 (April 1984), 89–96.
- "Chaim Perelman: Persona and Accommodation in the New Rhetoric." Pre/Text, An Interdisciplinary Journal of Rhetoric. 5 (Summer 1984), 89–96.
- "Argument as a Critical Act: Re-Forming Understanding." Argumentation. 1 (1987), 57–71.
- "Non-Discipline as a Remedy for Rhetoric?" Rhetoric Review. 6 (Spring 1988), 233–37.
- "Against Rhetorical Theory: Tripping to Serendip." in Texts in Context: Critical Dialogues in American Political Rhetoric. Ed. Michael C. Leff and Fred J. Kauffeld, Davis, California: Hermagoras Press, 1989, 1-10.
- "Rhetoric and Spirituality: Three Issues." Communication Studies. 40, no. 3 (1989), 172-66.
- "Eisenhower's Farewell: The Epistemic Function of Rhetoric." in Perspectives on Argumentation. Ed. Robert Trapp and Janice Schuetz. Prospect Heights, IL: Waveland Press, 1990, pp. 151-161.
- "Cold War Rhetoric: Conceptually and Critically." in Cold War Rhetoric: Strategy, Metaphor, and Ideology. Ed. Martin J. Medhurst and Robert L. Ivie. New York: Greenwood Press, 1990, pp. 1-18.
- "Epistemic Rhetoric and Criticism: Where Barry Brummett Goes Wrong." Quarterly Journal of Speech. 76, no. 3 (August 1990), 300–303.
- "The Necessary Pluralism of any Future History of Rhetoric." PRE/TEXT. 12, nos. 3-4 (Fall/Winter 1991), 195–211.
- "Can 'Controversy' Be Analyzed to Yield Useful Insights for Argument?" in Argument in Controversy. Proceedings of the Seventh Conference on Argumentation. Ed. Donn W. Parson. Annandale, VA: SCA, 1991, pp. 20–23.
- "Rhetoric is Epistemic: What Difference Does that Make?" in Defining the New Rhetorics. Ed. Theresa Enos and Stuart C. Brown. Newbury Park, NJ: Sage, 1993, pp. 120–36.
- "Dialectical Tensions of Speaking and Silence." Quarterly Journal of Speech. 79, no. 1 (Feb. 1993), 1–18.
- "Responses to the Gettysburg Address: Franklin D. Roosevelt." Iowa Journal of Communication. 25, no. 3 (1993), 115–18.
- "Argument Is, Therefore Arguers Are." In Argument and the Postmodern Challenge. Ed. Raymie E. McKerrow. Annandale, VA: SCA, 1993, 91–96.
- “Dialectical Tensions of Speaking and Silence.” Quarterly Journal of Speech. 79, no. 1 (Febr. 1993), 1–18.
- “Eisenhower’s Farewell Address” A Response to Medhurst.” Quarterly Journal of Speech. 81, 4 (1995), 496-501.
- “Epistemic Rhetoric” in Encyclopedia of Rhetoric. Theresa Enos. New York: Garland Publishing, 1996, pp. 232–34.
- With Robert Brookey. “Audiences Argue.” Proceedings of the Ninth SCA/AFA Conference on Argumentation. Annandale, VA: Speech Communication Association, 1996, pp. 16–20.
- “From Bacon to Bacon: Man in a Blue Box, An Aesthetic Turn in Rhetoric.” In Hollihan, Thomas A., ed. Argumentation at Century’s End. (Annandale, VA: NCA, 2000) pp. 278–85.
- “Between Silence and Certainty: A Codicil to ‘Dialectical Tensions of Speaking and Silence.” Quarterly Journal of Speech, 86.1 (Feb. 2000), 108–110.
