= Edwin Black (rhetorician) =

American academic

Edwin Benjamin Black
- Born: October 26, 1929; Houston, Texas
- Died: January 13, 2007 (aged 77); League City, Texas
- Education: University of Houston; Cornell University
- Occupations: Rhetorician, university professor
- Employer(s): Washington University in St. Louis; University of Pittsburgh; University of Wisconsin–Madison
- Known for: Rhetorical criticism

Edwin Benjamin Black (October 26, 1929 – January 13, 2007) was one of the leading scholars of rhetorical criticism. He criticized "Neo-Aristotelianism" for its lacking a larger historical, social, political, and cultural understanding of the text and for its concentrating only on certain limited methods and aspects, such as the Aristotelian modes of rhetoric: ethos, pathos, and logos. He urged critics to analyze both the motives and goals within situated cultural norms and ideologies.

== Biography ==
Born in Houston, Texas on October 26, 1929, Edwin Benjamin Black attended the University of Houston and graduated with a Degree of Philosophy in 1951. He earned his Master of Arts in Rhetoric and Public Address in Cornell University in 1953, and then he continued his Ph.D. study in Cornell University with a minor in philosophy and social psychology. He had a long teaching career started from the Arts and Sciences at Washington University in St. Louis (1956–1961). He then moved to the Dietrich School of Arts and Sciences as assistant professor in English Department (1961–1967) and finally to the University of Wisconsin–Madison College of Letters and Science (1967–1994). He earned the Cornell doctorate in 1962.

Black's major intervention can be summarized into three parts:

- Criticism is a practical action started from understanding the text rather than method or theory.
- Style and form are meaningful, ideological, and strategic components of the rhetorical art.
- Critics need to “attend not only to the means of rhetoric but also to its ends.”

Black's main publications include: Rhetorical Criticism: A Study in Method (1965) and The Second Persona (1970).

Black died on January 13, 2007.

== Rhetorical Criticism: A Study in Method ==
This book was developed as a continuous project for Black's Doctoral dissertation in 1962 from Cornell University. The book focused on the examination of fifteen essays from A History and Criticism of American Public Address and discussed the limitation of Neo-Aristotelianism's theories on rhetorical criticism. Black concluded that Neo-Aristotelian criticism is “founded upon a restricted view of human behavior, that there are discourses, which function in ways not dreamed of in Aristotle's Rhetoric, and that there are discourses not designed for rational judges, but for men as they are.”

Black argued that Neo-Aristotelianism placed disproportionate emphasis on the rationality of audience and limited the room for the development of “psychological criticism” and the study of social movements. The book also accused Neo-Aristotelians of seeing historical facts in an artificial mode, which eliminated the possibility of recreative criticism. This approach “paid no attention to the techniques of argument independent of their content; and circumscribed the assessment of effects to a discourse's impact on its immediate audience.”

In addition to critique on traditional rhetorical criticism approach, this book also constructed an alternative approach, which he called the “rhetorical transaction.” This alternative approach portrayed speeches under a continuum from “calm deliberation” to “extreme demagoguery,” using genre to classify and criticize based on situation. This book opened the field of rhetorical criticism and freed scholars from constraints of single critical paradigm.

== The Second Persona ==
Black also wrote The Second Persona, which concentrated on a “constitutive" perspective, (Constitutive rhetoric) emphasizing the evaluation of the worldview contained in a text rather than the text's spatio-temporally located effects. The book opened the field to defining concepts of agency and identity. This shift also encouraged critics to bring the study of ideology into rhetorical analysis, as critics could analyze the intended audience (as they were and as the speaker wanted them to be) as the “Second Persona” beyond the speaker's persona. These ideas were later extended into the analysis of “Third Persona” by Philip Wander and “Fourth Persona” by Charles Morris.

== Other publications ==
- Ideological Justifications, Quarterly Journal of Speech 70 (1984): 144–50.
- On Objectivity and Politics in Criticism, American Communication Journal 4, no. 1(2000)
- Considerations of the Rhetorical Causes of Breakdown in Discussion, Speech Monographs 22 (1955): 15–19.
- Plato's View of Rhetoric, Quarterly Journal of Speech 44 (1958): 361–74
- "Ideological Justifications", Quarterly Journal of Speech 70 (1984): 144–50.
- "Secrecy and Disclosure as Rhetorical Forms”, Quarterly Journal of Speech 74(1988): 133–50.
- Rhetorical Questions: Studies of Public Discourse. Chicago: University of Chicago Press, 1992.
- "Gettysburg and Silence”, Quarterly Journal of Speech 80 (1994): 21–36.
- "The Invention of Nixon.", in Beyond the Rhetorical Presidency. Ed. Martin J. Medhurst, College Station: Texas A&M University Press, 1996.
- "The Aesthetics of Rhetoric, American Style”, in Rhetoric and Political Culture in Nineteenth-Century America, Ed. Thomas W. Benson, East Lansing: Michigan State University Press, 1997, 1–14.
- "Richard Nixon and the Privacy of Public Discourse", Rhetoric & Public Affairs2 (1999): 1-29.
- "On Objectivity and Politics in Criticism”, American Communication Journal 4, no. 1 (2000)
