= James Boyd White =

American legal scholar

James Boyd White (born 1938) is an American law professor, literary critic, scholar and philosopher who is generally credited with founding the "law and Literature" movement. He is a proponent of the analysis of constitutive rhetoric in the analysis of legal texts.

== Biography ==
White attended Amherst College, from which he graduated in 1960 with a B.A. in classics, and went on to earn an M.A. in English literature from Harvard University in 1961, and an LL.B. from the Harvard Law School in 1964.

He practiced with the firm of Foley Hoag in Boston before moving into teaching. He taught at the University of Colorado School of Law from 1967 to 1974, at the University of Chicago Law School from 1974 to 1983, and has been at the University of Michigan Law School from 1983 until the present. At Michigan, White is the L. Hart Wright Professor of Law, Professor of English and Adjunct Professor of Classics. He is also a member of the American Academy of Arts & Sciences.

== Works ==
White's best-known book, The Legal Imagination: Studies in the Nature of Legal Thought and Expression, was published in 1973. It was designed essentially as a textbook for students studying legal language. In The Legal Imagination, literary and other texts are compared to legal texts in the way they "constitute" the identities of characters and the meanings of concepts. The book is thought to have "kicked off" the law and literature movement and is still widely influential.

White's subsequent books include:

- When Words Lose Their Meaning: Constitutions and Reconstitutions of Language, Character, and Community (1984)
- Heracles' Bow: Essays on the Rhetoric and Poetics of the Law (1985)
- Justice As Translation: An Essay in Cultural and Legal Criticism (1990)
- Acts of Hope: Creating Authority in Literature, Law, and Politics (1994)
- "This Book of Starres": Learning to Read George Herbert (1994)
- From Expectation to Experience: Essays on Law and Legal Education (2000)
- The Edge of Meaning (2003)
- Living Speech: Resisting the Empire of Force (2006)
- Keep Law Alive (2019)
