= Echoing (social science) =

Phenomenon in news coverage

In political communication, echoing refers to media outlets using the language, frames, or arguments that were used by political leaders in their news coverage. The term is most commonly used in research that examines the relationship between government officials and the press. The use of echoing by the media reinforces the politicians' preferred framing of political issues. Research suggests that the use of echoing can reinforce the way political leaders want issues to be understood by the public.

For example, if politicians consistently uses a particular phrase to describe a policy or national issue, news outlets may repeat that same phrase in their reporting. When echoing occurs, media outlets often use the same terminology or rhetorical framing in their coverage of an issue that was used in official speeches, press briefings, or policy communications.

== Theoretical background ==
The concept of echoing is connected to broader theories in political communications. The idea of the influence that politicians have on the media also includes agenda-setting and framing in addition to echoing and other theories. Some scholars have argued that politicians often intentionally attempt to shape public opinion through strategic communication, especially during major policy debates or national crises. This often involves an array of influencing strategies, and as a result it is uncommon to see echoing by itself. These theories explain how political actors and media organizations influence the issues and perspectives that reach the public.

Research on political communication suggests that when political leaders repeatedly promote consistent messages, those messages often become common in news reporting, through echoing, framing, agenda-setting, or other concepts. This phenomenon increases the influence of politicians over the communication system and reflects the close interaction between political leaders and journalists in the modern media environment.

== Empirical research ==
Echoing has been documented in several studies on political communication in the United States. Studies analyzed presidential speeches, compared them to news coverage and results concluded that media outlets sometimes reproduce or reuse the key themes and language in those presidential speeches. This shows uses of echoing and other theories in political communication.

For example, before the passage of the Patriot Act in 2001, communications from the U.S. presidential administration, combined with news coverage that utilized echoing of rhetoric from the administration, helped create an environment in the United States that encouraged rapid congressional approval of the legislation. Scholars argue that this complicated relationship between politicians and the media reflects the broader influence elites have on narratives and public understanding of political issues through media.

Longitudinal analyses of presidential addresses and media coverage suggest that echoing occurs consistently across decades, though the size of the effect varies depending on the political context and the level of journalistic scrutiny by society.

== Criticism and debate ==
Scholars continually debate whether echoing reflects media bias, structural constraints in journalism, or normal information flow between politicians and journalists. Some researchers argue that echoing may reduce the diversity of viewpoints in news coverage if journalists rely heavily on official sources. They state that when journalists repeat the language of politicians, it may limit critical scrutiny or alternative perspectives in media coverage. Other scholars offer the idea that the effect of echoing is limited and that journalists still include competing perspectives in many cases despite the use of echoing. Other scholars argue that echoing can occur simply because journalists rely on official sources and widely recognized political terminology when explaining complex policy issues to the public; echoing is simply a result of journalism and reporting on issues in a way that is understandable to the audience.

== Impact of social media ==
A new debate in the realm of echoing is being introduced by the use of social media as a political and news platform. The new discussions surrounding echoing and the rise of digital networks and social media focus on the fact that political messages can spread rapidly across multiple platforms and audiences and the impacts of that.

The introduction of social media into politics allows politicians to distribute their views, messages, and policy with increasing speed. This increases the likelihood that journalists will see these messages and quote or reference them in the news. The fragmentation of the digital media landscape allows for increased repetition and amplification of partisan frames, thus making it possible for political content to spread quickly online. As a result of this, journalists rely more on the current circulating political language to help increase viewership when reporting on current issues.

Another factor to consider is that politicians are now using social media specifically to influence constituents and voters. Campaigns specifically and strategically use social media to promote specific keywords and narratives, which then get reported through the echoing in the media. Some politicians have their own social media accounts so that they can spread their own opinions and views.

Journalists often monitor these channels for news-worthy content. This means that messaging from politicians is sometimes entering the news cycle faster from social media than from the traditional media channels. The overall landscape of social media encourages speed, posting as fast as possible, and breaking the news first, leading to rapid repetition and amplification through echoing.

As a whole, news organizations respond to trending political narratives, especially on digital platforms. Most of this originates from the politicians themselves, since they have social media presences. As a result of digital and social platforms being so popular, when political leaders use them to push particular frames, rhetoric, or agendas on social media, they shape the language and frame that journalists use when covering that issue. Social media acts as a bridge between political messaging and news reporting, increasing the chances that the news uses the same rhetoric and words of the politicians.

Overall, social media accelerates the circulation of the language used by politicians, which makes it more likely that administration framing and terminology appear in news reporting.
