= Language as Symbolic Action =

1966 book by Kenneth Burke

- Author: Kenneth Burke
- Language: English
- Publisher: University of California Press
- Publication date: 1966
- Publication place: United States

Language as Symbolic Action: Essays on Life, Literature and Method is a book by Kenneth Burke, published in 1966 by the University of California Press. As indicated by the title, the book, Burke's 16th published work, consists of “many of Burke's essays which have appeared in widely diverse periodicals” and has thus been regarded as one of the most significant resources for studying and comprehending Burke’s ideas.

== Overview of Book ==
Language as Symbolic Action is divided into three parts: (1) Five Summarizing Essays (2) Particular Works and Authors and (3) Further Essays on Symbolism in General.

=== Five Summarizing Essays ===
The first of Burke’s five essays is the “Definition of man” which defines man as

. . .the symbol-using (symbol-making, symbol-misusing) animal, inventor of the negative (or moralized by the negative), separated from his natural condition by instruments of his own making, goaded by the spirit of hierarchy (or moved by the sense of order), and rotten with perfection.

The next chapter “Poetics in Particular, Language in General” returns to a discussion of perfection continued from the previous chapter. Burke summarizes this chapter by stating:

The poetic motive does indeed come to a head in the principle of perfection . . . But the principle of perfection should not be viewed in too simple a sense. We should also use the expression ironically . . . the motive of perfection may extend to areas far beyond the confines of poetry and poetics.

Osborn explains this concept further: “. . . a truly rigorous attempt to account for a single work on the grounds of poetics alone should force recognition that it is necessary to go beyond poetics-in-particular to language-in-general. . .” Perfection, according to Burke and similar scholars, is a motive that exists both in literature and beyond, as an underlying human desire that drives much symbolic action.

The third and often-referenced chapter “Terministic Screens” makes use of many key terms of Burke's “dramatistic” approach to literary and rhetorical criticism. Burke begins the chapter by explaining the “scientistic” and the “dramatistic.” “‘A scientistic approach begins with questions of naming, or definition’(44). A ‘dramatistic’ approach stresses ‘language as an aspect of ‘action,’ that is, symbolic action’(44).” Burke explains that, through the concept of terministic screens,

“any nomenclature necessarily directs the attention into some channels rather than others.” This can be obvious, such as how different academic subjects direct the attention, or more subtle. Burke illustrates the latter point with an example of how photos of the same objects using different color filters reflected and deflected his attention in different ways, depending on the filter (45).

Terministic screens is significant to the process of rhetorical criticism, as well as understanding rhetoric, because terministic screens are a conduit to understanding reality.

=== Particular Works and Authors ===
The 11 chapters comprising Part II engage in rhetorical criticism of, among others, Shakespeare’s Antony and Cleopatra, the Oresteia, Faust, and William Carlos Williams.

=== Further Essays on Symbolism in General ===
Part III consists of eight chapters. One of the more significant of these is chapter six, entitled “Medium as Message.” Burke takes one of his peers, Marshall McLuhan, to task for focusing too much on the media rather than the symbolic resources of language.

Burke’s main criticism of McLuhan stems from his most memorable slogan and the undue emphasis put on medium. “If the medium is the message, obviously the important thing is not what somebody says in a given medium, but what medium he uses, regardless of what he says. . . The medium is the message. Hence, down with content analysis” (413).

Burke continues the discussion on the relative importance of medium to message by acknowledging the relationship as significant and stating that certain content can be better delivered by or suited to a specific medium.

== Reception ==
Burke’s ideas, through these significant essays, have had widespread influence. Burke scholar Nelson J. Smith III offered this review: “Much of what our current generation of rhetoricians accomplishes will be drawn from the preliminary and pioneer investigations into the sociology of ideology by Kenneth Burke.” Frederick J. Hoffman also writes: “[Burke’s] range and scope are truly remarkable. If there are predecessors and contemporaries in this respect, they are probably Remy de Gourmont. . .and Eric Auerbach. . . His fate is that of a man some years ahead of his time.” The range of critical ideas and practices included in Language as Symbolic Action help scholars explore this breadth.
