= Identification in rhetoric =

Identification is a key theme in the works of Kenneth Burke as part of the New Rhetoric movement. Contemporary rhetoric focuses on cultural contexts and general structures of rhetoric structures. Burke was a notable contemporary U.S. rhetorician who made major contributions to the rhetoric of identification. James A. Herrick describes one of Burke's foundational ideas with identification is that "rhetoric makes human unity possible, that language use is symbolic action, and that rhetoric is symbolic inducement."

For Burke, words were Terministic screens through which people see the world and interact with each other. Herrick further explains that identification in rhetoric is crucial to persuasion, and thus to cooperation, consensus, compromise, and action. Burke believed that the most serious human problem was to be alienated or separated, and rhetoric was to be that problem's only solution. Much of his work was based on bringing people back together. However, Burke argues that "Identification is affirmed with earnestness precisely because there is division; Identification is compensatory to division." Rhetoric's goal, in regards to identification, is to bring people together of whom have been separated by estrangement or opposition. Those who feel isolated or separate from others may identify joint interests with others or become part of an institution -- "'Belonging' in this sense is rhetoric."

Burke suggests that whenever someone attempts to persuade, identification occurs: one party must "identify" with another. That is, the one who becomes persuaded sees that one party is like another in some way. His concept of identification works not only in relation to the self (e.g. that tree has arms and is like me, thus I identify with that tree), but also refers to exterior identification (e.g. that man eats beef patties like that group, thus he is identified with that beef-patty-eating group). One can perceive identification between objects that are not the self.

== Definition ==
Burke plays an important part in learning and understanding the core values of rhetorical theory in identification. He introduces the notion by taking the Aristotelian approach into a "world of particulars." Burke states that Aristotle treated rhetoric as purely verbal. However, there are also areas of overlap. The flexibility of identification that Burke has created expands into elements beyond language. He wrote that "identification ranges from the politician who, addressing an audience of farmers, says, 'I was a farm boy myself,' through the mysteries of social status, to the mystic's devout identification with the source of all being." This symbolic interaction is possible because it recognizes the hidden sources of identification among human beings as symbol users. From this, Burke understood symbols as constantly present, and believed that choosing to accept and learning to accurately read symbols was crucial.

Burke frequently referred to the philosophical meaning of "substance" when explaining identification and identifying acts. He defined substance as "an act; and a way of life is an acting-together." When people identified with one another, they shared substance, which made them consubstantial.

== Theoretical grounding ==
Burke's theory of identification responded to Sigmund Freud's theory of identification in psychology and Karl Marx's theory of alienation. Burke linked identification to Aristotle's theories of persuasion in Rhetoric. Identification does not reject or oppose persuasion; rather, persuasion involves identification. For example, audiences may be persuaded if they identify with logical appeals or if they identify with the rhetor.

== Types of identification ==
Burke classified three types of identification enactments:

1. One may emphasize common ground with others to establish a rapport ("identification by sympathy")
2. One may emphasize a common opposition to an idea or separate group; this identification by common foe may also enable people to avoid conflict within their own group. Rhetoric may frequently be framed as "us" and "them" to strengthen the identification bond ("identification by antithesis")
3. One may inaccurately identify oneself with the qualities of an associated object or group. For example, one driving a powerful car may mistakenly think they are the source of the car's power; an ordinary person may feel "deceptively aggrandized by thoughts of his citizenship in a powerful nation" ("identification by false assumption")

== Application ==
Burke's theory of identification has been applied and expanded upon in Krista Ratcliffe's Rhetorical Listening framework. Ratcliffe proposes the "blurring of Burke's and [Diana] Fuss's theories of identification," and what becomes visible is multiple places for rhetorical listening. When applying Burke and Fuss's theories, Ratcliffe proposes non-identification in cross-cultural communication and feminist pedagogy. Her critique of Western logic is that it is difficult to simultaneously pay attention to both commonalities and differences, but that is where non-identification exists and thus provides a place for rhetorical listening. Burke's theory is critiqued by Ratcliffe for only focusing on identification; she argues that rhetorical listeners need to be accountable and take into consideration different points of view, which can be done through simultaneous listening to commonalities and differences.

Ratcliffe draws upon Diana Fuss because Fuss expands Burke's theory of identification to gear toward examining the differences in identification. Fuss defines Identification as related to the issue of connection between opposite entities, such as the interrelation between self and other, subject and object, and insiders and outsiders. For Fuss, identification is difficult to pinpoint, as the distinction between opposite entities is porous, oftentimes "impossibly confused and finally untenable." Fuss further builds the connection between identification and disidentification. Fuss defines disidentification as contingent on previous identification with another group, no matter how stereotypical the identification is, while at the same time the identification has receded from the subconscious. Ratcliffe argues that previously identification has been configured as a metaphor, which is manifested in Burke's consubstantiality and Fuss's (dis)identification. Ratcliffe notes that metaphor has been used to function as the dominant trope for identification; however, metaphor foregrounds commonalities more than differences. Ratcliff suggests theorizing identification via the use of metonymy to counter the privilege of communality. Intrinsic to the trope of metonymy is an attention to both commonalities and differences.

Practical applications of Burke's "identification" can be seen in the scholarly effort to reframe identifications. Assembling essays from the fifth Biennial Rhetoric Society of America Conference, Michelle Ballif addresses Ratcliffe's call for rethinking Burke's notion of identification "as a place of perpetual reframing that affects who, how, and what can be thought, spoken, written, and imagined." While some of the essay contributors draw upon Burke's theory to reinterpret social identifications, others turn to specific social actions to reread Burke's "identification." For instance, following Ratcliffe's critique of Burke's theory for its lack of attention to difference, Dominic J. Ashby destabilizes Burke's relatively fixed and teleological construction of identification with "a fluid and contingent notion of self"—that is, "uchi/soto," or inside/outside in Japanese rhetoric—highlighting a simultaneous exclusion and inclusion of outsiders through an ongoing unfolding of group dynamics. By way of analyzing the Facebook news feed of "We are all Khaled Said," Katherine Bridgman expands Burkean identification to "embodiment," or the mutually coordinated experience between speakers and their audiences triggered by specific circumstances. Along a similar vein, critiquing Burke's consubstantiality for being sexually indifferent, Janice Odom draws from Irigaray's feminist theories to reframe identification as a playground of sexual dominance and surrender.

Arabella Lyon warns of "identification as magical thinking" as people might imagine they have more in common with a rhetor or audience. Further, she argues that Burke's concept of identification is an abstract ideal that may not recognize power imbalances or account for marginalized persons and communities.

Douglas Downs compares identification to a rhetor holding up a mirror image to the audience that reflects their core values and beliefs. Identification relies on the identities of both the speaker and listener, it causes the audience to develop a deeper trust for the author which makes it more likely for them to take the same position.

Identification theory has also been applied to the business communication and organizational rhetoric. Rhetoric within an organization becomes a part of its identifying culture. Employees tend to identify with their organization and its best interests, and reinforcing rhetoric within the organization strengthens an employee's sense of belonging to the organization.
