= Taxonomy of the burden of treatment =

Visualization

The taxonomy of the burden of treatment is a visualization created for health care professionals to better comprehend the obstacles that interfere with a patient's health care plan. It was created as a result of a worldwide, qualitative-based study that asked adults with chronic conditions to list the personal, environmental, and financial barriers that burden a patient. The purpose of this visualization is to help health care providers develop personalized management strategies that the patient can follow through a narrative paradigm. The goal is to target interventions, achieve an interpersonal doctor-patient relationship, and improve health outcomes.

== Patient advocacy ==
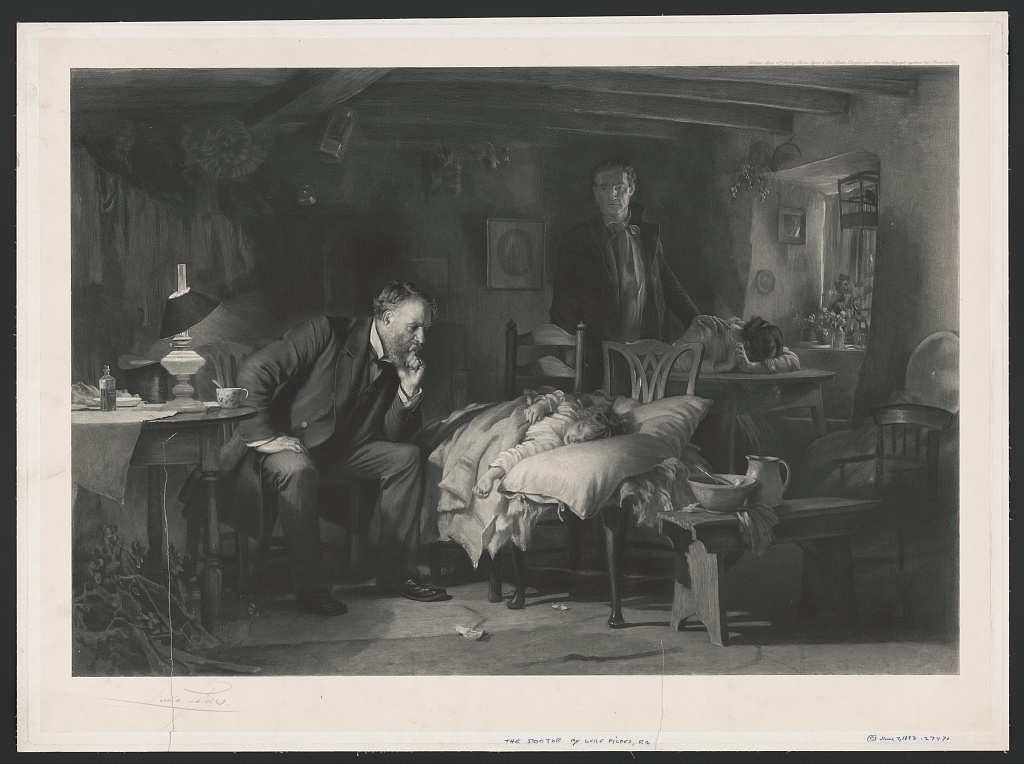
A doctor caring for a patient in 1893

The increasing autonomy in patients has encouraged them to demand a more patient-centered relationship with their healthcare providers. In the past, patient-doctor relationships have been widely paternalistic. Doctors were very respected for their knowledge and they often withheld information from patients without question. The development of the internet has now given patients the ability to research their health conditions, ask more questions, and want to be a part of the conversation. The shift towards patient advocacy and interpersonal collaboration allows shared trust, respect, and healthcare goals.

Noncommunicable diseases (NCDs) are now the leading cause of death worldwide over communicable diseases. The 5 leading causes of death in the US in 2017 were all non-communicable diseases: ischemic heart disease, Alzheimer's disease, lung cancer, stroke, and chronic obstructive pulmonary disorder. NCDs require prolonged management that usually lasts for the rest of a person's life. The risk factors of NCDs are strongly behavioral including poor diet, lack of exercise, and substance use. Because these risk factors are known and controllable, a significant percentage of NCDs are preventable. This classification of diseases require patients to change their lifestyle habits in accordance to their long-term disease. Because of this, patients are expected to play an active role in their healthcare alongside their provider to implement and enforce these lifestyle changes.

== The visualization ==
The taxonomy of burden is broken down into the three sections: healthcare tasks, factors that exacerbate the burden of treatment, and consequences of healthcare tasks imposed on patients. These include personal, structural, financial, and emotional aspects of a patient's life.

=== Healthcare tasks ===
1. Management of medications
  - Medication Intake
    - Prepare and take drugs
    - Plan and organize drug intake
    - Follow specific precautions
  - Organizing non-pharmacological treatment
    - Store medication at home
    - Refill medication stock
2. Access/use equipment
3. Plan/perform physical therapy
4. Lifestyle changes
  - Enact diet
    - Force myself to eat some foods
    - Eliminate some foods
    - Plan and prepare meals
    - Be careful of ingredients in meals
  - Perform physical exercise
    - Organize physical exercise
    - Perform some physical activities
    - Give up on some physical activities
  - Change/organize sleep schedule
  - Give up smoking
  - Perform other lifestyle changes
5. Follow-up
  - Plan and organize self-monitoring
  - Burden associated with tests
    - Plan and organize lab tests
    - Precautions before/when performing tests
  - Burden associated with doctor visits
    - Plan and organize doctor visits
    - Remember questions to ask the doctor
  - Organize transportation
6. Organize formal caregiver care
7. Paperwork tasks
  - Take care of administrative paperwork
    - Organize medical paperwork
8. Understanding of the illness and treatment
  - Learning about my condition or treatment
  - Learn to navigate the healthcare system

=== Factors that exacerbate the burden of treatment ===
1. Characteristics of treatment
  - Nature
  - Time required
  - Frequency
2. Structural Factors
  - Access to resources
    - Pharmacy does not have the medication in stock
    - Access to lab test results
    - Access to the right healthcare provider
    - Distance from healthcare facilities
    - Difficulty planning last-minute consultations
  - No coordination between health providers
  - Health center problems
    - Parking near healthcare facilities
    - Wait times
3. Personal Factors
  - Beliefs
    - My treatment conflicts with some of my religious beliefs
    - I feel dependent on my treatment
    - I believe my treatment is inefficient
    - I believe that some follow-up tasks are useless
    - I believe that some consultations are useless
    - I'm anxious about performing tests and their results
  - Relationships with others
    - Seeing other patients reminds me of what could happen to me
    - I have to regularly explain my condition to others
    - I hide my condition or treatment from others
    - My loved ones don't help me with my condition/treatment
    - My loved ones impose unnecessary precautions
    - I feel that I'm a burden for others
  - Relationships with healthcare providers
    - For health care providers, I am a condition and not a person
    - Healthcare providers neglect some problems for others
    - Healthcare providers don't take into account my psychological problems
    - I feel that healthcare providers don't trust what I tell them
    - Healthcare providers don't explain things to me
    - My physician doesn't take into account my context
    - My physicians don't know about my condition/treatment
4. Situational Factors
  - Travels
    - Access to structures or equipment when not at home
    - Take medications when not at home
    - Store medications when not at home
    - Plan and organize travel
  - Exceptional circumstances at home
    - Follow my diet in the presence of other people
    - Organize my diet to accommodate other people
  - Changing physicians
  - Pregnancy

=== Consequences of healthcare tasks imposed on patients ===
1. Lack of adherence
  - Non-intentional non-adherence
  - Intentional non-adherence because of costs
  - Intentional non-adherence because of complexity
    - Development of strategies not to forget to take medications
2. Impact on daily life
  - Professional life
    - Coping with judgement from others
    - My healthcare activities interfere with my career
    - Coping with absence from work
    - Opportunity cost in professional life
  - Social life
    - Treatment interferes with leisure activities
    - My healthcare activities interfere with my couple life
    - Treatment interferes with family/friend commitments
  - Emotional impact
    - Treatment reminds me that I have a chronic condition
    - Guilt associates with intentional non-adherence to treatment
    - Frustration because of not being able to do everything I want to
  - Financial impact
    - Indirect costs of treatment
    - Direct costs of treatment

== Personal and emotional factors ==
=== Medication, treatment, and appointment adherence ===
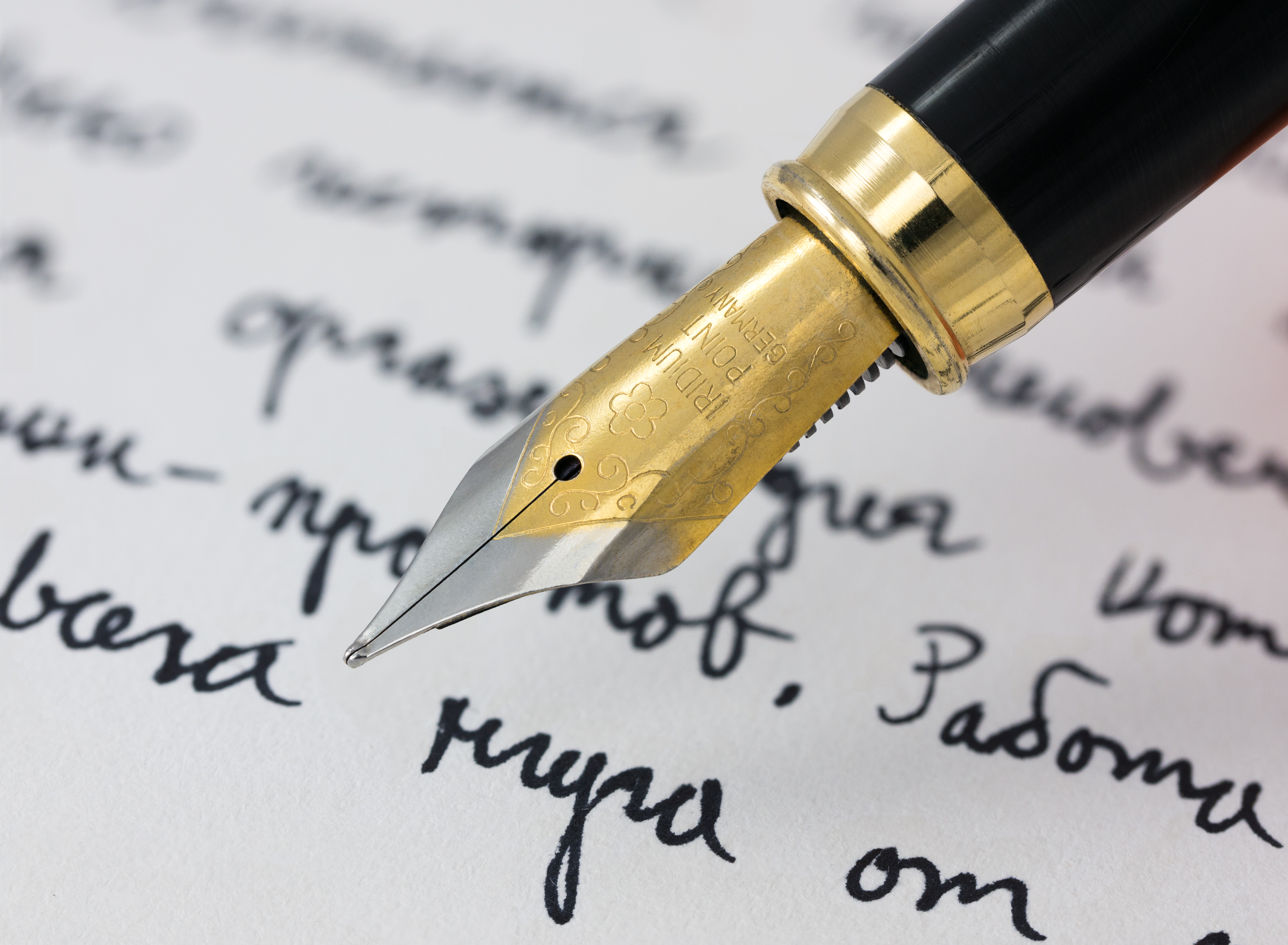
Reading and writing

Health literacy is a factor in adherence to medication and treatment as well as progress towards health goals. Language barriers, disabilities, and years of education play a role in health literacy. The competence a person has to assess, understand, and communicate health information frames a person's ability to process their disease and successfully self-manage it. Medication self-management is a health promotion activity involving filling, understanding, organizing, taking, monitoring, and sustaining medications. Anything that hinders a person's ability to perform those tasks negatively impacts their adherence to medical instructions. Having multiple or constantly switching medications can complicate keeping track of what each medication is for and how to administer each one. Approximately a quarter of prescriptions for medications are never filled due to cost or a lack of understanding the necessity of the mediation.

The adherence to treatment and follow-up appointments involve having an effective plan, coordinated decision making, personal knowledge of signs and symptoms, management of functionality, and access to support services. Personal responsibilities such as work and family interfere with treatment and appointment adherence. The already existing conflict between work and family contributes to tardiness and a lack of attendance. These effects are exacerbated with additional commitments such as medical appointments and treatment. With inflexible work schedules, people can be in poor occupational standing for missing work for appointments regarding their own health or the health of a family member. Creating effective disease management requires a focus on cultural, personal, and situational aspects. Patients should be given information in a way that they can understand in order to integrate these treatments to improve their quality of life.

=== Lifestyle disruption: diet, exercise, substance use, and sleep ===
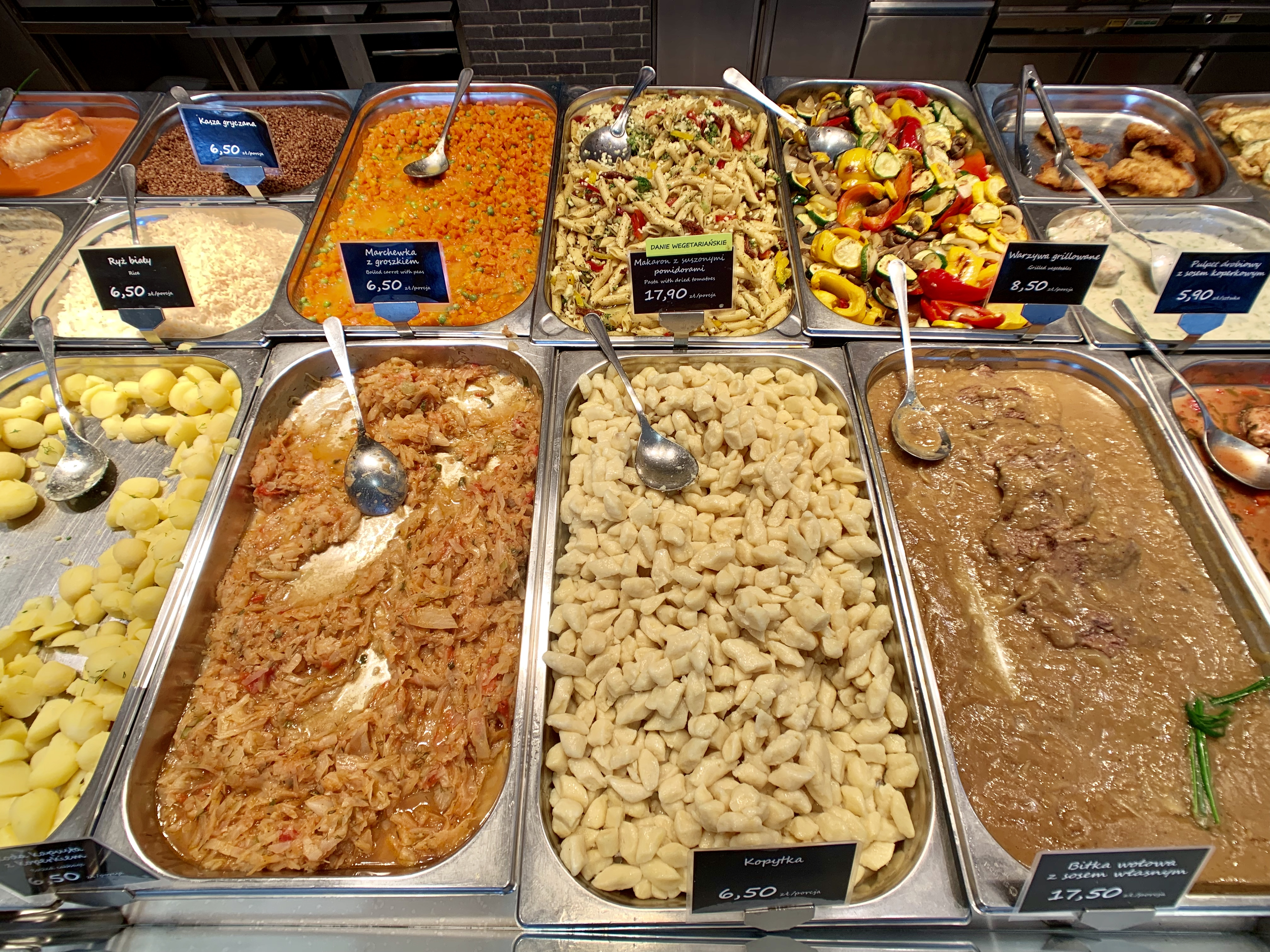
Fast food

Lifestyle medicine is prescribed to prevent and decrease the progression of chronic diseases. Unlike traditional medicine, lifestyle medicine focuses on behavior modification, making it an effective means of primary, secondary, and tertiary prevention. The interventions include nutrition, physical activity, sleep, and substance use.

Diet interventions are particularly difficult to implement into someone's life due to the interference with a biological drive: hunger. Nutrition improvements involve increasing low-energy dense foods and decreasing high-energy dense foods. Food deserts, the availability of cheap, high-energy foods, and time scarcity all contribute to poor eating habits. For some households, parents do not have the time to prepare healthy meals on top of child care, work, and other responsibilities. Additionally, people with children may have difficulty implementing these changes because buying nutrient-poor foods can please their children and avoid food waste.

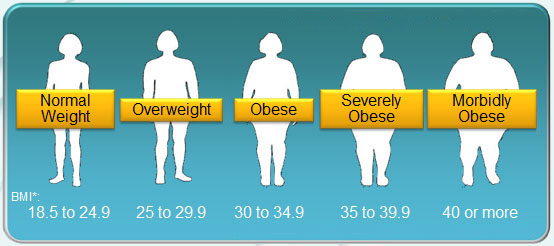
The BMI associated with different stages of weight

The prevalence of obesity in the United States continues to rise with a majority of American adults unable to meet the full set of physical activity guidelines. Prescriptions for exercise are given involving aerobic and/or resistance exercise. They usually involve performing 150 minutes a week of mild to moderate exercise or 75 minutes a week of vigorous exercise. Some reasons people do not exercise are because of negative emotions associated with exercise, lack of perceived control, and lack of purpose.

Substance use and substance use disorders reduce the life expectancy of those with NCDs, contributing to mental disorders, additional physical ailments (i.e. cirrhosis), injuries, and suicide. The process of quitting substance use involves uncomfortable withdrawal symptoms that can be hard to tolerate in especially stressful periods of time. Treatment strategies may require long-term treatment with multiple relapses.

Insufficient sleep and sleep disorders have been associated with chronic diseases and obesity. Some say sleep disorders may increase appetite, the desire for unhealthy foods, and hormone irregularities that affect satiation. Additionally, insufficient sleep leads to lethargy and in turn, decreased physical activity.

=== A new identity ===
When someone is diagnosed with an NCD, there can be significant changes and sacrifices an individual must adjust to, depending on the nature of the disease. People can begin to experience a lack of purpose, isolation, and a loss of identity or culture after the diagnosis. Depression and anxiety are common in people with chronic disease, which can negatively effect a person's self management and worsen their disease. These conditions can impact social and occupational responsibilities. A person may also be struggling with ownership of their condition and may feel out of control. Different cultures can interpret conditions in various ways in terms of treatment, physiology, and symptoms. An individual's beliefs on their NCD can be interpreted in different ways based on their culture. The lifestyle a person lives is strongly influenced by the culture they live in, and changing it can make an individual feel like they are giving up on their culture's meaningful practices. Addressing the mental health of patients with NCDs is helpful in accommodating their transition to living with an NCD.

== Structural and financial factors ==
=== Management and coordination of healthcare staff and units ===
Management and coordination of interprofessional collaborative practices is crucial in executing high quality and cost effective care. A challenge in managing healthcare is seamlessly coordinating care amongst different providers in order to coordinate across specialized units. Consultation meetings, responsibility designations, and protocols are essential of many ways to ensure communication and coordination. For patients, adequate management means shorter hospital stays, optimal care, resource availability, increased satisfaction, and lowered costs.

=== Physical accessibility ===
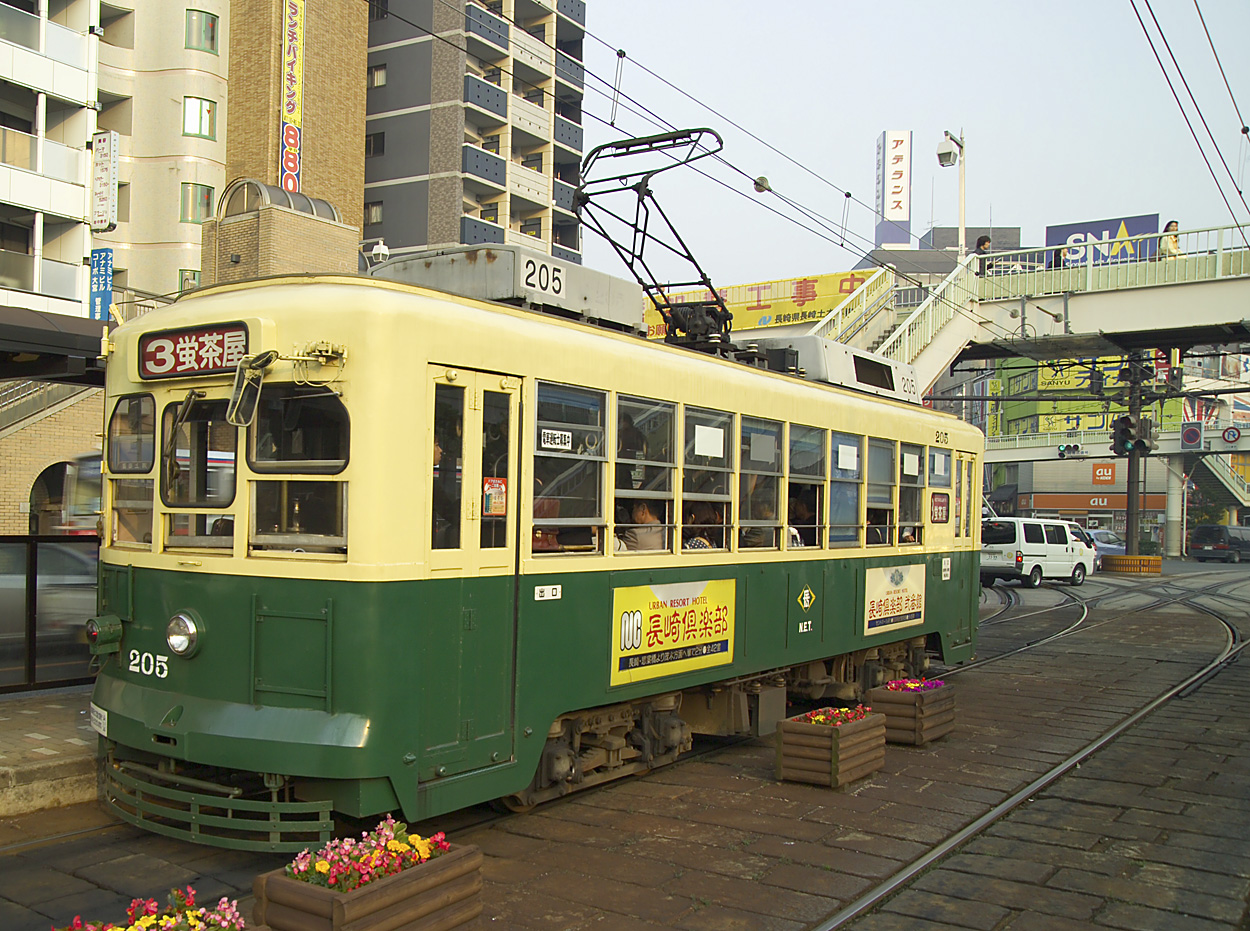
Public transportation

Accessibility in healthcare can prevent a patient from receiving prompt and effective care. Geographical barriers contribute to the unequal distribution of providers and resources. This involves both poor physician-to-population ratios or unreachable physical distances to get to providers. Transportation is particularly challenging for those without vehicles who have to rely on public transportation. This leads to missed appointments and delayed care especially when prolonged medical attention is needed. Mobile health is a newer intervention being explored to increase the engagement and accessibility of medical care.

=== Socioeconomic status ===
Those with lower socioeconomic status are vulnerable to engage in unhealthy behaviors, develop medical problems, and struggle accessing health care. Lower socioeconomic households are more likely to face overcrowding, lack of mobility, lack of basic amenities, and low health literacy. Those with lower socioeconomic status are more likely to witness violence in their neighborhood, have instability in their routines, and struggle with mental health due to emotional distress. Because of this, they are more likely to use substances and less likely to venture out of their home, engage in physical activity, eat healthily, and have a regular mealtime routine. Some of these households are non-white minorities, who can experience an additional linguistic barrier and lack of awareness of medical services. Non-white minorities can also experience deliberate or subconscious racism in healthcare on an institutional and personal level. These can lead to quicker diagnoses based on stereotypes as well as presumptions of lifestyle (i.e. drug abuse, intelligence level, etc.). These assumptions have been associated with less preventative healthcare offered to them, such as screenings or vaccinations. Historical events such as the Tuskegee and Guatemala experiments have contributed to a lack of trust in healthcare, discouraging minorities from seeking medical assistance. These disadvantages prevent families from implementing healthy lifestyle changes that NCD treatment calls for.

Healthcare has become increasingly expensive as technology has advanced, giving those with a greater income an advantage of affording more healthcare. In countries that do not have universal health care such as the US, individuals who are under or uninsured are less inclined to get tests, treatments, etc. Over half of US adults have not being able to pay medical bills, delayed care because of cost, went underinsured at some point in their life, or are currently uninsured. People with lower socioeconomic status have increased financial uncertainties and multiple stressors, exacerbating their burden to access health care.

== Future research ==
Providers should be comfortable creating individualized interventions for their patients when implementing lifestyle changes. Motivational tactics have been explored to aid a patient's adherence to NCD lifestyle changes, but more interventions and research are needed. There are currently no studies that analyze the effect of introducing to the taxonomy of burden in health practices. There is also no standard to measure the quality of interactions between doctors and patients, with limited research on grading healthcare interactions beyond being "good" or "bad". There is also limited research on the effectiveness of online healthcare communities.
