= Theory of narrative thought =

The theory of narrative thought (TNT) is designed to bridge the gap between the neurological functioning of the brain and the flow of everyday conscious experience.

== Background ==
TNT is a refinement of image theory, which was developed as an alternative to rational choice theory. The essence of image theory is that decisions are shaped by long-term attempts to manage the future rather than short-term results. The image theory model of the decision process, called the compatibility test, held up in both laboratory and field tests and has been retained in TNT. Image theory's weakness was its failure to adequately specify the concept of image. Attempts to specify it led to its replacement by narrative, the definition of which was based upon the work of Walter R. Fisher (1987) in communication theory. Exploration of the definition's implications led to TNT, in which narrative is proposed as the primary mode of human thought.

== Nature of narrative ==
The theory begins with the observation that the brain bundles sequences of sensations into events. In a causal world, sequentially implies causation and causation implies time. The result is that sensed events are organized by time and causation. The formal name for this form of organization is narrative; a chain of caused events leading from the past to the present. The theory posits that the evolutionary value of this organization lies in its use of the causal implications of the past and present to infer what may reasonably be expected to occur in the immediate future. This allows potential threats to be identified and evaluated and action to be taken to avoid or to reduce potential damage before the future actually arrives. This ongoing chronicle of one's experience is called one's prime narrative. It is the bedrock knowledge one has of one's world, the source of one’s intuitive reasoning, the basis of one’s private thought, and the source for one’s communications with others.

== Coherence ==
The more straightforward the causal chain from the past, through the present, and into the implied future, the more coherent the prime narrative is. The more coherent it is, the more plausible it is and hence the more certain one is that it represents reality. Absent this, one would have no reliable basis for anticipating the future and its attendant threats. The need for coherence and certainty is called the coherence principle: The reality offered by the prime narrative is believed to the degree to which the narrative is coherent and action is prompted by the necessity to maintain or increase that degree of belief. The principle manifests itself in resistance to experience (information) that would reduce coherence as well as in openness to and search for experience that increases coherence.

== Language ==
By the time one is able to speak in meaningful sentences, one has experienced a rich and varied world involving a large number of causally related events that can be used for predicting events in the future. This experience is absorbed into the prime narrative, enriching and expanding understanding about what is going on and what to expect in the immediate future. But, fundamental as it is, the richly detailed prime narrative is inconvenient for communication, which requires simpler, more adaptable stories that fit the context. Consequently, the prime narrative must be abridged for communicating with others in the form of simplified story lines, omission of detail, and contextualization. It is further abridged for communicating with ourselves (thinking) in the form of subvocalization and imagery. These abridged versions of the prime narrative are themselves narratives; they retain the temporal/causal structure of the original but they are pared down, the gist, the strongest causal links and events, relegating everything else to the background. These abridgments are called derived narratives.

Derived narratives are key to an expanded vision of the future. The prime narrative’s implied future is limited to the immediate consequences of what is happening now and what led up to it. This frequently allows insufficient time for identification and mitigation of threats before they occur. A longer lead time requires the implied future be expanded, which relies upon thinking and communicating with others about what may lie beyond it. Because the prime narrative is the bedrock knowledge for thinking and communication, and coherence is imperative, the expanded future is constrained to provide a coherent extension of it.

== Standards and threats ==
With the acquisition of language comes the ability to receive communications from significant others about the rules of one’s social group. These rules, called standards, are about how the world should work. Standards define security, enduring values and beliefs, and transient preferences. Security includes physical and mental well-being, acceptance, affiliation, affection, and so on. Values and beliefs include morals, ethics, and ideals—equity, justice, solidarity, stewardship, truth, beauty, and goodness—together with civic and religious ideologies and the responsibilities one should assume in the course of performing one’s daily duties and engaging in social interactions. Preferences include partialities and desires that may vary over time and circumstance.

At the same time that one is acquiring language and standards, one is learning what happens when those standards are violated. This allows one to anticipate consequences, threats, and work to avoid them or soften the blow. Threats are defined as discrepancies between expectations about how things will be and standards for how they should be. The greater the discrepancy between expectations and standards, the more intense the anticipated threatening consequences and their attendant emotions. Violations resulting from exceeding standards can be as intensely threatening as violations resulting from falling short of standards—too much of a good thing.

== Decisions ==
All decisions are about anticipated threats—about discrepancies between expectations and values or preferences, between what one anticipates will happen and what one wants to happen. When the threat is sufficiently large, a plan of action must be chosen to mitigate the anticipated negative consequences. The best action is the one that offers the future that is least threatening, least discrepant from one’s standards, although under time pressure, the first plan of action that offers significant reduction in the discrepancy may be chosen and implemented (i.e., satisficing; Simon, 1956 ).

== Plans ==
A plan is a derived narrative about how to go from the present to a more desirable future—how to influence the course of ongoing events to make the future, when it arrives, conform to one's standards. Like other narratives, plans must be causally coherent; the sequence of proposed actions must create a feasible causal chain from the present to the desired future.

== Theory of 'the mind' ==
Other than the information processing metaphor, cognitive science has produced no encompassing theory. It seems to be widely assumed that when such a theory appears, it will necessarily be in terms of the neurology underlying brain functioning, of which conscious experience is subsidiary and derivative. TNT challenges this assumption by recognizing that brain functioning and conscious experience are two qualitatively different things. Although subjective experience derives from brain activity, it is not reducible to it. Therefore, the theory recognizes the importance of the brain and how it works, but it also recognizes the importance of conscious experience and how it works. Putting the two together as equally legitimate and complementary provides the “something more” than neural activity in the brain that is implied by the word “mind.”
