= Militant =

Aggressive adherent to a cause

A militant is a person engaged in warfare or combat. The word is often used as a euphemism for someone who is an entrenched or aggressive adherent to a particular cause, often an ideological faction. The term is most commonly used by mass media to maintain a neutral tone and not appear biased to one side, which has led to criticism.

John Simpson writes in a BBC piece that "terrorist" is a loaded word used by people who morally disapprove of militant actions. However, the founding principles of the BBC preclude it from telling readers and listeners who to support and condemn. Even during World War II, Nazis were not referred to as "evil", but as "the enemy". And during The Troubles when attacks occurred at home, there was immense pressure to change usage, but the broadcaster remained firm. CBC News editor Esther Enkin wrote that CBC has avoided terms like "terrorist" for over thirty years, and most Western media do so. They prefer the viewer or listener to use their own judgement. The CBC language guide instructs journalists to be cautious with the words terrorist and terrorism, but the terms are controversial. Using them would cause a problem of distinguishing one incident as terrorism, and another as a "mere" bombing. Reuters also only uses "terrorist" in attributed quotes, but allows the use of terrorism and counter-terrorism in general, but not specific events. The policy intends to use dispassionate language without emotive terms, so people can make their own judgement.

== See also ==
- Freedom fighter
- Political narrative
- Activist
- Belligerent
- Church militant
- Combatant
- Crusader
- Demonstrator
- Extremist
- Fundamentalism
- Guerrilla
- Insurgent
- Jihadist
- Mujahideen
- Paramilitary
- Partisan
- Protester
- Rebel
- Resistance movement
- Rioter
- Soldier
- Vigilante
- Warrior
- Zealot
