= Definition of man =

Definition of Man, also known as the Definition of Human, originated from a summary essay of Kenneth Burke (1897–1993) which he included in his 1966 work, Language as Symbolic Action. Burke's work in communication has spanned many fields and focuses primarily on rhetoric. He is also known for his theory of Dramatism, wherein he characterizes life to not just reflect or be like a drama but rather that life is drama.

== Definition ==
Burke's definition of man states: "Man is the symbol-using (symbol-making, symbol-misusing) animal, inventor of the negative (or moralized by the negative), separated from his natural condition by instruments of his own making, goaded by the spirit of hierarchy (or moved by the sense of order), and rotten with perfection".

== Symbol-using Animal ==
Burke distinguishes man from other animals by drawing an analogy between man and birds. He argues that unlike birds, which cannot use symbols to communicate, man is able to use language towards pragmatic ends. To illustrate this point, Burke recalls seeing a bird trapped inside a college classroom. The windows were open, but the bird kept flying upwards to the ceiling, rather than through the window. If the bird could use symbols to communicate then one could simply inform the bird of the open windows and it could fly out to freedom. Its natural instinct to fly up coupled by its inability to use symbols, however, prevents its escape. Burke, also argues that not only does man use symbols, but concedes that man makes and misuses symbols as well.

== Condensation ==
One aspect of symbols that Burke points out in his discussion of Sigmund Freud's work is condensation. This explains man's ability to condense symbols into categories that can be understood by others to include a variety of other symbols. The example he gives is using the word furniture to refer to chairs, tables, etc.

Burke's defining of man in these terms leads to man's quest for identity and social belonging. Burke sees all human action as infused with symbols. These symbols are used to help create our sense of who we are and where we fit. In order to accomplish these, man seeks for differences and commonalities respectively.

== Inventor of the negative ==
While Burke struggles with using the word inventor for he feels that language has invented man, he points out that negatives do not exist in nature. He contends that negatives are purely a characteristic of symbol systems, which he has already determined belong uniquely to man. He further refers to morality as being particularly human and based largely on the idea of negatives; that is, there are things we should not do. Intrinsic to this portion of Burke's Definition is the idea of paradox. Burke explains that the idea of negation is, by its nature, paradoxical. He explains that conditioning a statement with a negative draws a positive image of that very statement. This, he argues, defeats the purpose of negation, yet is an inescapable situation.

== Separated from his natural condition by instruments of his own making ==
In this section of Burke's definition he describes man's natural state as being that of basic needs and appetites. However, because of his tools and language, he has taken on a nature completely different from his original state. He cites an example of a day when the electricity of New York City went out and how unnatural it seemed for the streets to be filled with darkness; darkness being a state of man's first nature. However, because of man's tools, a state of lighted streets has become natural. One major example of man's instruments is exemplified in technology. Technology has accomplished the task of separating man from nature.

== Goaded by the spirit of hierarchy ==
This portion of Burke's description seeks to define man as being drawn to order and status. He points to positions in society that imply this fact. One such example he draws upon is the division of labor that exists in society. Others are titles of nobility and peasantry.

== Rotten with perfection ==
This last portion of Burke's definition has particular importance to his other philosophical theories of man. Man being rotten with perfection speaks to the motives that are distinct in man; motives being an intrinsic part of Burke's Dramatism, distinguishing action from motion.

Burke refers to Aristotle's notion of entelechy, which states that we seek to reach the perfection of our kind. This, however, is not present in nature. Burke points out that a rock and a tree are perfectly acceptable as being what they are, but not so with man for he aims to be higher than he is.

While man's striving for perfection may afford him to reach admirable goals and progress, Burke also sees man's goal of perfection as one rife with danger. He points to our concepts of perfection in accordance with other terms. One particularly clear example he gives is the perfection for which was strived by the Nazis thus alluding to the consequences to which such ambitions may lead. Lastly, Burke explains that such dichotomies of perfection give credence to man's belief in God and Devil and Heaven and Hell.

== Modern-day applications ==
Feminist scholarship has shown a use of Burke's definition as a framework by which a definition for woman can be derived. Their definition is as follows: "Woman is the symbol-receiving animal, inventor of nothing, submerged in her natural conditions by instruments of man's making, goaded at the bottom of hierarchy, and rotten by perfection". This particular definition clearly conveys a perception that views man as the suppressor of woman and the cause for her restrained condition.

One notable scholar, Celeste Condit, has written in an effort to modernize Burke's works and his "definition of man" in particular by calling for a Post-Burkean philosophy that takes Burke's ideas and transports them into what she calls the new scene, or modern day. She calls particularly for a restructuring each part of Burke's definition into terms that are founded on but surpass radical feminist ideologies as seen above. Condit defines people as those who play with symbols, invent the negative and possible morality, changed from nature by tools that men and woman have collectively made, struggling for equality, and at times rotten and perfect. Condit seeks to transform Burke's emphases of race and class into gender and culture.

J. MacLennan has used Burkean ideas, particularly his dramatistic pentad, in analyzing criminal behavior and offering an understanding of criminal behavior that is often at odds with the ideas of many criminologists and psychologists. Of particular interest to MacLennan is Burke's first clause in his definition of man as a "symbol-using animal". MacLennan maintains that this clause, coupled with Burke's ideas of motive, help explain criminal behavior. Burke posits that man uses symbols to obtain his goals, thus his motives are often carried out as acts based on his intentions. Thus Burke maintains that man's actions (use or misuse of symbols) are based on choices and not a compulsion or sickness. This has great implications for modern psychology which often views abnormal and criminal behavior as an illness that is forced upon those who act out in unacceptable ways.
