= Political narrative =

Concept in sociology

Political narrative is a term used in the humanities and political sciences to describe the way in which storytelling can shape fact and affect understandings of reality. However, political narrative is not only a theoretical concept, it is also a tool employed by political figures in order to construct the perspectives of people within their environment and alter relationships between social groups and individuals. As a result, fiction has the potential to become fact and myths become intertwined into public discourse. Political narrative is consequential in its ability to elicit pathos, allowing the narrative to be influential through the value it provides rather than the truth that is told.

Meta-narratives are an important component to political narratives as it encompasses the artificiality of storytelling within a political context. They are central in shaping understandings of reality through the creation of history under the guise of grandeur and tales of development or expansion.

== Background ==
The notion of political narrative stems from concepts illustrated in narrative theory, which has become increasingly popular in the humanities and political science as a result of the popularisation of "fake news" following the inauguration of Donald Trump in 2017. The study of narrative began at the beginning of the 20th century and experienced a resurgence in the 1970s when feminist researchers began to highlight the way in which women's lives are framed in storytelling - and this research has subsequently pioneered research on gendered political narrative today.

Narrative theory grew from the ideas present within literary theory which experienced reform during the 1940s when novels began to gain validity as a medium for literary study. Poetry and drama had been valued for the aesthetic in its form and structure, however, novels became significant for their ability to influence the reader more broadly. Narrative theory emerged from the notion that stories are able to provide an illustration of human nature rather than just impersonal narrations. Ideas surrounding narrative and political science began as a result of work conducted by scholar Walter R. Fisher who conceptualised the term narrative paradigm in order to contend that narrative is the most persuasive form of communication and is thus central to politics.

== Various uses of political narrative ==
=== The 2016 US Election ===
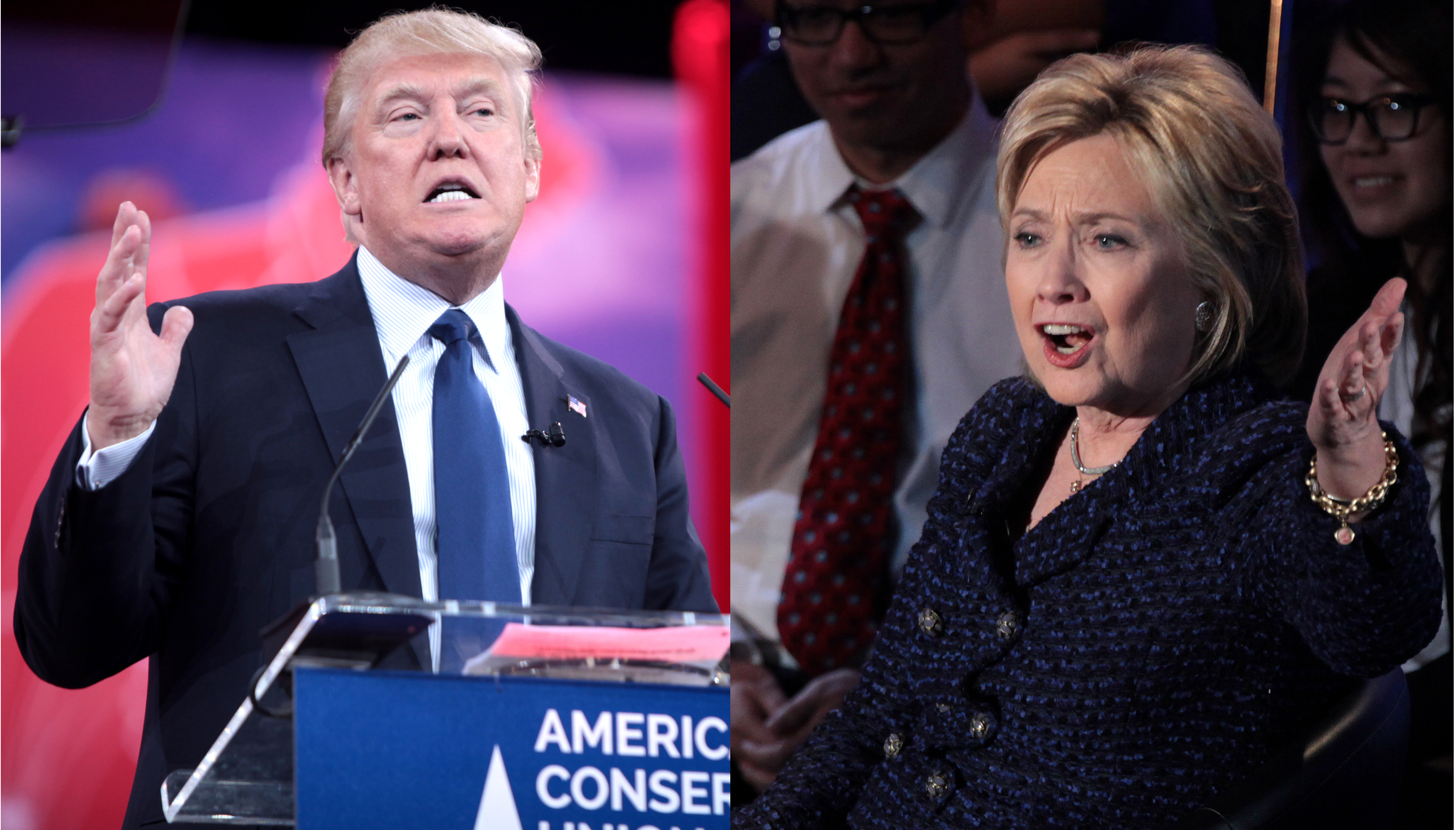
Donald Trump and Hillary Clinton during the 2016 U.S. Presidential Election.

The power of narrative and storytelling in politics has been highlighted by the 2016 United States presidential election which created an environment that allowed storytelling to become the basis for building shared senses of belonging between people. The collective nature of the identities and opinions that formed around these stories, and the sentiment of the narrative's message swayed the vote that people cast. The narrative of cultural loss that was perpetuated by Trump throughout his campaign built on the moral panic {{POV statement}} that had already existed within the country. Theories of political narrative suggest that the emergence of certain types of narrative occur out of the sentiments already within our culture, and that political actors are simply suggesting the way in which the situation ought to be restored.

The narratives that were used during 2016 US Election largely revolved around the Hillary Clinton email controversy, Russian interference during the election, immigration policy and economic policy. Sociologist Arlie Hochschild coins these narratives as deep stories to describe the way in which emotions often outweigh facts when political narratives are told.

=== Australia and the Children Overboard affair ===
The use of political narrative is often undertaken in order to counteract perceived threats in a society as acting against a common threat can mobilise political support and distract attention from underlying problems. Philip Ruddock, the Minister for Immigration at the time of the event, stated to the media on October 7, 2001 that the Australian Defence Force intervened when a suspected 'illegal entry vessel' entered Australian waters and allegedly threw their children overboard. This story was further perpetuated by various high-profile ministers of the Australian Government, such as the Minister for Defence, Peter Reith, and the Prime Minister, John Howard. However, this story was shut down by the Australian Senate Select Committee for an inquiry into a maritime incident which found that Philip Ruddock and the other government ministers had used this narrative as a political tool during the 2001 Federal Election campaign.

Narrative has been used throughout Australia's political history. Political speeches are one of the most notable tools to convey political narratives in Australia, and this is done annually through the Australian budget speech which sustains a narrative told by the Commonwealth on governance and expenditure. While political speeches are not unique to the Australian context, they have historically shaped many milestones for the nation, notably those surrounding Indigenous affairs, such as Prime Minister Kevin Rudd's Apology to Australia's Indigenous peoples in 2008.

=== Nazi Germany and Anti-semitism ===
Propaganda is a tool often employed by political figures in order to shape the opinions of particular people and expand and interweave their narratives into the realities of society. Nazi propaganda was an extremely suppressive tool used by Adolf Hitler's dictatorial regime to spread lies for his political gain. The consistency of the narrative told by the Nazi party has been argued by historians to be a factor which led to the large scale at which the systematic genocide against Jewish people during the Holocaust was able to be committed. The tools that were used to spread the narrative included speeches, essays, newspaper articles, films, books, the education system and posters. Joseph Goebbels was the Minister of Propaganda for the Nazi party who masterminded the regime's use of Jewish people to scapegoat for the social and economic frustrations of the interwar period as a result of the losses of World War One and the stipulations placed on Germany as a result of the Treaty of Versailles.

The narratives constructed by Nazi Germany are important to consider when discussing political narratives as they encompass the way in which falsehoods and the elimination of fact can have detrimental outcomes. Storytelling in this context is not only employed as a political tool, but is also a means through which ideologies are built through a skewed political reality.

== Gendered political narrative ==
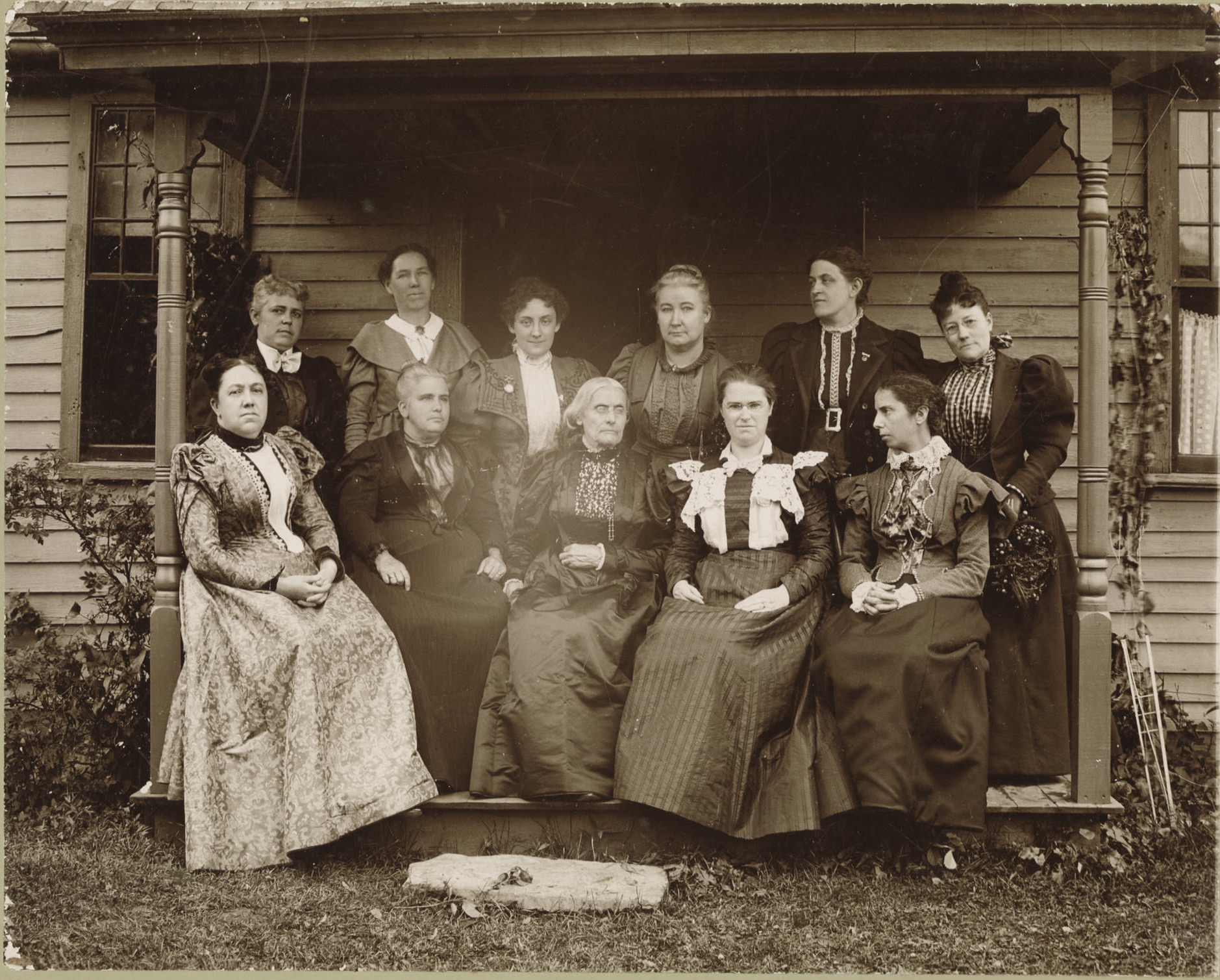
Susan B. Anthony with Woman's Rights Leaders, 1896

Narratives in politics often exclude marginalised groups, including women, due to the patriarchal history of the political system. The concepts behind gendered political narrative include the way in which women are framed in these narratives and the way that they have been omitted from creating them. This is largely to do with the lack of representation of women in politics and the gender inequality that still exists today which contribute to the lack of empowered female narratives in political arenas.

The importance of gender in political narratives is seen in its influential role in shaping the make-up of society, from the way we organise to the way we think. Thus, the male dominated way in which political decisions have been made and continue to be made today in the 21st century highlight the reason why political narratives started to become feminist with the Suffragette Movement and the increase of Women's Rights activists in the late 19th and early 20th century.

== Media and the facilitation of political narrative ==
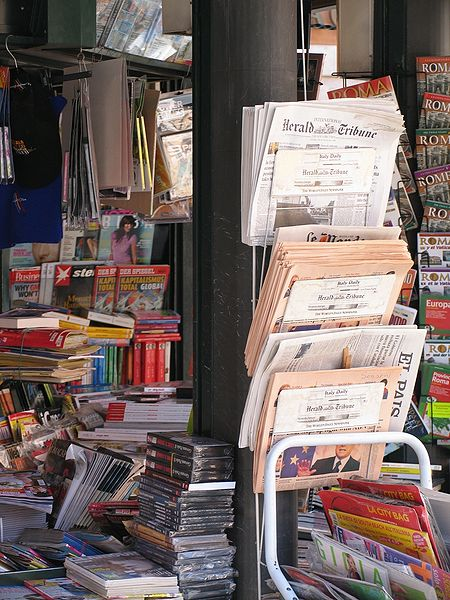
Newspaper stack

The media has had a key role in the facilitation and perpetuation of political narratives. In Australia, the media was used as a tool for spreading the narrative created for the Children Overboard affair to the public. More significantly, media played an extremely important role in the 2016 US presidential election not only within the United States, but also globally. However, the election campaign also highlighted the increasing significance of social media in facilitating political narratives as it has become the most used platform to access news sources.

The media is often linked to political violence and the ways in which terrorism prevails as a result of the distribution of messages through media outlets. However, the media is multifaceted and unique in its ability to portray multiple narratives while remaining impersonal. While media outlets run stories relevant to the people within their country, international news sources are essential in the perpetuation of political narratives outside of the storytellers target audience. The 2016 election is an exemplary example of the way in which narratives flow from place to place as the powerful nature of the United States media infrastructure allowed for content to be accessed limitlessly by international media. However, while the narratives during the election were not intended for audiences outside of the US, the international attention meant that they had an impact on global political actors.

== See also ==
- Narrative
- Narrative paradigm
- Storytelling
- Political discourse
- Media and politics
