= Walter Fisher (professor) =

American academic (1931-2018)

Walter Fisher (1931–2018) was an American academic credited with formalizing Kenneth Burke's Dramatism and introducing the narrative paradigm to communication theory. Fisher was Professor at the Annenberg School for Communication.

Fisher's body of work is based on the concept that people are essentially storytellers, referred to as narrative theory. Storytelling is one of the oldest and most universal forms of communication and so Fisher propounded that individuals approach their social world in a narrative mode and make decisions and act within this narrative framework

== History ==
Narrative theory was developed by Walter Fisher. Fisher obtained his Ph.D. from the University of Iowa in 1960 and went on to become a professor, among other things. Perhaps Fisher’s most notable contribution was his formulation of the narrative approach to rhetoric and communication theory. In 1979 he was awarded the Golden Anniversary Monograph Award from the Speech Communication Association for the article that introduced narrative theory to the field of communication. Narrative theory was not totally accepted by the discipline (Miller, 2005, p. 92): It clashed with several pre-existing beliefs as to the nature of human beings and how they communicate and act. Fisher describes this contrast by identifying the tenets of what he sees as two universal paradigms: the rational world paradigm, and the narrative paradigm (Fisher, 1987).

== Publications ==
=== Books ===
- Fisher, Walter R. (1987). Human Communication as Narration: Toward a Philosophy of Reason, Value, and Action. Columbia: University of South Carolina Press. ISBN 0-87249-500-0

=== Book chapters ===
- Fisher, Walter R. (1995). "Narration, Knowledge, and the Possibility of Wisdom" in Rethinking Knowledge: Reflections Across the Disciplines (SUNY Series in the Philosophy of the Social Sciences). (Fisher & Robert F. Goodman as editors). New York: State University of New York Press.

=== Papers ===
- Fisher, Walter R. (1984). "Narration as a Human Communication Paradigm: The Case of Public Moral Argument." in Communication Monographs 51. pp. 1–22.
- Fisher, Walter R. (1985). "The Narrative Paradigm: An Elaboration." in Communication Monographs 52. December. pp. 347–367.
- Fisher, Walter R. (1985). "The Narrative Paradigm: In the Beginning." in Journal of Communication 35.Autumn. pp. 74–89.
- Fisher, Walter R. (1988). "The Narrative Paradigm and the Assessment of Historical Texts." in Argumentation and Advocacy 25.Fall. pp. 49–53.
- Fisher, Walter R. (1989). "Clarifying the Narrative Paradigm." in Communication Monographs 56. pp. 55–58.
- Fisher, Walter R. (1994). "Narrative Rationality and the Logic of Scientific Discourse." in Argumentation 8. pp. 21–32.
