= The Rhetoric of Hitler's "Battle" =

The Rhetoric of Hitler's "Battle" is an influential essay written by Kenneth Burke in 1939 which offered a rhetorical analysis of Adolf Hitler's rise to power in Germany. Much of Burke's analysis focuses on Hitler's Mein Kampf ("my struggle"). Burke (1939; reprinted in 1941 and 1981) identified four tropes as specific to Hitler's rhetoric: inborn dignity, projection device, symbolic rebirth, and commercial use. Several other tropes are discussed in the essay, "Persuasion" (Burke: 1969).

== Tropes ==
=== Common enemy ===
One trope is the idea of the common enemy. Without an enemy with a mindless determination to destroy everything good and beautiful, all states struggle with the economic and social problems of unemployment and poverty. The idea of a common enemy is thus a symbol of the evil against which people must unite, and it distracts the people from politically inconvenient issues by relating all evils to the common rhetorical enemy. According to Burke, that creates an antithesis. We are born separate individuals and divided by class or other criteria and so identification is a compensation to division. (Burke, 1969, p. 22). He sees that human need to identify with or belong to a group as providing a rich resource for those interested in joining us or, more importantly, persuading us. To promote social cohesion, antithesis makes a simple balancing statement, "We do this" but "They do that". The symmetry creates an expression of conjoined opposites, which stigmatizes the latter and encourages the former to cohere by doing only "this". At first, the enemy may be local politicians or other voices that might criticize the protagonist's actions. Then, all opposing voices are seen as antithetical to unity: without a united voice, the outside enemies will gain the upper hand. If the nation goes to war, fascism requires everybody in society and every aspect of society to be involved in the war effort and machine and so the society fights as one organism under the leader.

=== Geographical materialization ===
All roads lead to Rome. In Ancient Rome, that was literally and metaphorically true. All roads radiate from the capital of the Roman Empire, and all tribute and authority were owed to the emperors. That is a form of cognitive mapping, which associates inspiring ideology and strong leadership with a particular location. Hence, Hitler promoted Munich as the place to which all roads must lead, with geography materializing the ideology of fascism.

=== Unifying voice ===
The unification rhetoric demands a unifying voice: the entire nation must speak as one person. That is the essence of the authoritarian ideal and produces a totalitarian one-party state.

=== Projection devices ===
Projection devices are scapegoating tactics which personalize the initially vague threats posed by the common enemy. At a social level, the internal problems of unemployment and poor trading performances are directly attributed to the activities of the "identified others". Simplification is a particularly effective rhetorical device to deal with an uncritical population by permitting rhetoricians to rise to power through their persuasive abilities and frequently outmaneuvering those with expert knowledge who do not communicate well. In this context, Burke (1941) identified Hitler's use of apodictic argumentation in which anecdotal experiences are asserted as proof of his social analysis.

=== Inborn dignity ===
It is usual to define a national ideal, archetype or class of citizen as a measuring stick by which all other types of people are to be judged. The archetype will be heroic, noble, and dignified to appeal to the vanity in the majority, and the others will be subhuman and easily distinguished by reference to their ethnicity, religion, or politics. For that rhetoric to be effective, it must always address existing prejudices. Hitler proposed the Manichean antithesis of superior: inferior through the superiority of das Volk, the Aryan race, over the inferior races ("in particular Jews and Negroes"). Through this "Hitler also, however, posits that this dignity is innate only to his own bloodline."

=== Symbolic rebirth ===
Wink and others identify symbolic rebirth rhetoric as allowing a people to aspire towards a new utopian society. When the scapegoat is eliminated, a rebirth will occur. The morally negative action of elimination is justified by a positive goal of symbolic rebirth in which all ideals are realized. It will occur only once in a lifetime.

=== Commercial use ===
Another trope is commercial use, which offers a non-economic interpretation of economic problems that appeals to the class that will benefit the most if the competition is removed. Thus, Burke (1941) identifies Hitler's attribution of Germany's economic difficulties to "Jewish" moneylenders by suggesting that if they were removed, "Aryan" finance would be in control.

== Journal citations ==
The following journal articles reference the essay:

- "Telling it like it is: Jim Pankiw and Politics of Racism", Rhetor. Journal of the Canadian Society for the Study of Rhetoric, 2007, p1-23, 23p; (AN 27747329)
- Blain, Michael (April 2005). "The politics of victimage:: Power and subjection in a US anti-gay campaign". Critical Discourse Studies. 2 (1): 31–50. doi:10.1080/17405900500052168.
- Engels, Jeremy (February 2005). "Reading the Riot Act: Rhetoric, Psychology, and Counter-Revolutionary Discourse in Shays's Rebellion, 1786–1787". Quarterly Journal of Speech. 91 (1): 63–88. doi:10.1080/00335630500157532.
- Katz, Steven B., "GUEST EDITORIAL: A RESPONSE TO PATRICK MOORE'S "QUESTIONING THE MOTIVES OF TECHNICAL COMMUNICATION AND RHETORIC: STEVEN KATZ'S 'ETHIC OF EXPEDIENCY'"." Journal of Technical Writing & Communication, 2006, Vol. 36 Issue 1, p. 1-8, 8p; (AN 20338972)
- Kiewe, Amos, "Theodore Herzl's The Jewish State: Prophetic Rhetoric in the Service of Political Objectives", Journal of Communication & Religion, September 2003, Vol. 26 Issue 2, p. 208-239, 32p; (AN 14350131)
- Lee, Michael J. (November 2006). "The Populist Chameleon: The People's Party, Huey Long, George Wallace, and the Populist Argumentative Frame". Quarterly Journal of Speech. 92 (4): 355–378. doi:10.1080/00335630601080385.
- Maddux, Kristy, "Finding Comedy in Theology: A Hopeful Supplement to Kenneth Burke's Logology", Philosophy & Rhetoric, 2006, Vol. 39 Issue 3, p, 208-232, 25p; (AN 22497430)
- Moore, Mark P. (December 2006). "To Execute Capital Punishment: The Mortification and Scapegoating of Illinois Governor George Ryan". Western Journal of Communication. 70 (4): 311–330. doi:10.1080/10570310600992129.
- Roberts-Miller, Patricia, "DEMOCRACY, DEMAGOGUERY, AND CRITICAL RHETORIC", Rhetoric & Public Affairs, Fall 2005, Vol. 8 Issue 3, p. 459-476, 18p; (AN 18536135)
- Spielvogel, Christian, "'YOU KNOW WHERE I STAND': MORAL FRAMING OF THE WAR ON TERRORISM AND THE IRAQ WAR IN THE 2004 PRESIDENTIAL CAMPAIGN", Rhetoric & Public Affairs, Winter 2005, Vol. 8 Issue 4, p. 549-569, 21p; (AN 19628709)
- "In Praise of Kenneth Burke: His "The Rhetoric of Hitler's 'Battle'" Revisited", Josef Schmidt, Rhetor, V.1, 2004
