= Terministic screen =

Term in the theory and criticism of rhetoric

Terministic screen is a term in the theory and criticism of rhetoric. It involves the acknowledgment of a language system that determines an individual's perception and symbolic action in the world.

== Overview ==
Kenneth Burke develops the terministic screen in his book of essays called Language as Symbolic Action in 1966. He defines the concept as "a screen composed of terms through which humans perceive the world, and that direct attention away from some interpretations and toward others". Burke offers the metaphor to explain why people interpret messages differently, based on the construction of symbols, meanings, and, therefore, reality. Words convey a particular meaning, conjuring images and ideas that induce support toward beliefs or opinions. Receivers interpret the intended message through a metaphorical screen of their own vocabulary and perspective to the world. Certain terms may grab attention and lead to a particular conclusion. "Language reflects, selects, and deflects as a way of shaping the symbol systems that allow us to cope with the world".

== Scientistic versus dramatistic ==
Burke describes two different types of terministic screens: scientistic and dramatistic. Scientistic begins with a definition of a term; it describes the term as what it is or what it is not, putting the term in black and white. When defining, the essential function is either attitudinal or hortatory. In other words, the focus is on expressions or commands. When terms are treated as hortatory, they are developed. Burke comments on why he uses developed rather than another word. "I say 'developed'; I do not say 'originating'. The ultimate origins of language seem to me as mysterious as the origins of the universe itself. One must view it, I feel, simply as the 'given' ". The dramatistic approach concerns action: thou shalt or thou shalt not. This screen directs the audience toward action based on interpretation of a term. Via terministic screens, the audience will be able to associate with the term or dissociate from it.

== Social constructionism ==
"Social constructionism is a metaphor that attempts to capture the way Burke viewed the nature of the world and the function of language therein." Symbols, terms, and language build our view of life. Social constructionism allows us to look at Burke's theory in terms we recognize and are comfortable with.

== Examples ==
When a person says gender, most people, based on their individual beliefs, normally think of male or female. However, some could think of intersex individuals. If someone says they think of male, female, and intersex, more would be reflected about the person based on their terminology. Still others would recognize gender as different from biological sex, and say they think of man, woman, and other genders. Another example occurs within the abortion controversy. A pro-choice advocate would most likely use the word "fetus" but opponents of legal abortion would use the word "baby", because the term stirs more realistic and relatable images and has a bearing on the legal status. Using the word "baby" versus "fetus" defines reality differently (scientistic) and guides people to act in a certain way (dramatistic) solely based on term selection that may be unconscious.

== Importance ==
Words are absolute for thought and action. In other words, language is needed to perform thought and action. One can not think without language, and therefore can not act without language and thought. In his "Definition of Man" Burke refers to man as the "symbol using animal" because of man's capacity to use a complex web of symbol systems (language) for meaning making. According to Burke, individuals create terministic screens consciously and unconsciously, as they perceive the world and share perspectives. Burke contends these screens set up a network of beliefs through which all ideas will be interpreted. Communication scholar Paul Stob contends that the language we use is thus not just a direct reflection of our intelligence, but also of perception and culture. David Blakesley posits that the terministic screen enables the further understanding of rhetorical perspectives. In each of these ways, the terministic screen allows for concepts to be interpreted in different ways by different people and contribute to the complexity of meaning.

== See also ==
- Framing – Effect of how information is presented on perception
- Frame analysis – Multi-disciplinary social science research method
- Linguistic relativity, also known as Sapir-Whorf hypothesis – Hypothesis of language influencing thought
