= Kenneth Burke =

American philosopher and literary critic (1897–1993)

- Born: Kenneth Duva Burke; May 5, 1897; Pittsburgh, Pennsylvania, U.S.
- Died: November 19, 1993 (aged 96); Andover, New Jersey, U.S.
- Occupations: Literary theorist, philosopher

Education
- Education: Ohio State University; Columbia University

Kenneth Duva Burke (May 5, 1897 – November 19, 1993) was an American literary theorist, poet, essayist, and novelist, who wrote on 20th-century philosophy, aesthetics, criticism, and rhetorical theory. As a literary theorist, Burke was best known for his analyses based on the nature of knowledge. He was one of the first theorists to stray from more traditional rhetoric and view literature as "symbolic action."

Burke was unorthodox, concerning himself not only with literary texts but also with the elements of the text that interacted with the audience: social, historical, political background, author biography, etc.

For his career, Burke has been praised by The Johns Hopkins Guide to Literary Theory and Criticism as "one of the most unorthodox, challenging, theoretically sophisticated American-born literary critics of the twentieth century." His work continues to be discussed by rhetoricians and philosophers.

== Personal history ==
Kenneth Duva Burke was born on May 5, 1897, in Pittsburgh, Pennsylvania, and graduated from Peabody High School, where he befriended classmates Malcolm Cowley and James Light. He attended Ohio State University to pursue courses in French, German, Greek, and Latin. He moved with his parents to Weehawken, New Jersey, and later enrolled at Columbia University. During his time there, he was a member of the Boar's Head Society. The constraining learning environment impelled Burke to leave Columbia, never receiving a college diploma. In Greenwich Village, he kept company with avant-garde writers such as Hart Crane, Malcolm Cowley, Gorham Munson, and later Allen Tate. Raised by a Christian Science mother, Burke later became an avowed agnostic.

In 1919, he married Lily Mary Batterham, with whom he had three daughters: the feminist, Marxist anthropologist Eleanor Leacock; musician (Jeanne) Elspeth Chapin Hart; and writer and poet France Burke. He later divorced Lily and, in 1933, married her sister Elizabeth Batterham, with whom he had two sons, Michael and Anthony. Burke served as the editor of the modernist literary magazine The Dial in 1923, and as its music critic from 1927 to 1929. He was an avid pianist. He received the Dial Award in 1928 for distinguished service to American literature. He was the music critic of The Nation from 1934 to 1936, and was awarded a Guggenheim Fellowship in 1935.

His work on criticism was a driving force in placing him back in the academic spotlight. As a result, he was able to teach and lecture at various colleges, including Bennington College, while continuing his literary work. Many of Burke's personal papers and correspondence are housed at Pennsylvania State University's Special Collections Library. But despite his stint lecturing at universities, Burke was an autodidact and a self-taught scholar.

In later life, his New Jersey farm was a popular summer retreat for his extended family, as reported by his grandson Harry Chapin, a popular singer-songwriter. Burke died of heart failure at his home in Andover, New Jersey, age 96.

== Persuasions and influences ==
Like many 20th-century theorists and critics, Burke was heavily influenced by Karl Marx, Sigmund Freud, and Friedrich Nietzsche. He was a lifelong interpreter of Shakespeare and also significantly influenced by Thorstein Veblen. He resisted being pigeonholed as a follower of any philosophical or political school of thought, and had a notable and very public break with the Marxists who dominated the literary criticism set in the 1930s.

Burke corresponded with a number of literary critics, thinkers, and writers over the years, including William Carlos Williams, Malcolm Cowley, Robert Penn Warren, Allen Tate, Ralph Ellison, Albert Murray, Katherine Anne Porter, Jean Toomer, Hart Crane, and Marianne Moore. Later thinkers who have acknowledged Burke's influence include Harold Bloom, Stanley Cavell, J. Hillis Miller, Susan Sontag (his student at the University of Chicago), Erving Goffman, Geoffrey Hartman, Edward Said, René Girard, Fredric Jameson, Michael Calvin McGee, Dell Hymes, and Clifford Geertz. Burke was one of the first prominent American critics to appreciate and articulate the importance of Thomas Mann and André Gide; he produced the first English translation of "Death in Venice", which first appeared in The Dial in 1924. It is now considered much more faithful and explicit than H. T. Lowe-Porter's more famous translation, published in the United Kingdom in 1928 and in the U.S. in 1930.

Burke's political engagement is evident—A Grammar of Motives takes as its epigraph ad bellum purificandum ("toward the purification of war").

American literary critic Harold Bloom singled out Burke's Counterstatement and A Rhetoric of Motives for inclusion in his book The Western Canon.

Beyond his contemporary influences, Burke took Aristotle's teachings into account while developing his theories on rhetoric. A significant source of his ideas is Aristotle's Rhetoric. Drawing from it, Burke oriented his writing about language specifically to its social context. Similarly, he studied language as involving more than logical discourse and grammatical structure because he believed the social context of language cannot be reduced to principles of pure reason.

Burke draws a line between a Platonic and a more contemporary view of rhetoric, described as "old rhetoric" and "new rhetoric" respectively. The former is defined by persuasion by any means, while the latter is concerned with "identification." Burke's use of the word refers to the process by which a speaker associates themself with certain groups, such as a target audience. His idea of identification is similar to ethos in classical rhetoric, but it also explains the use of logos and pathos in an effort to create a lasting impression on the auditors. It is characterized by "identifying" with a speaker's rhetoric insofar as their words represent a world that seems to be that in which we live. This theory differs from ethos most significantly in Burke's conception of artistic communication that he believes is defined by eloquence, which is "simply the end of art and therefore its essence." The use of rhetoric conveys aesthetic and social competence, which is why a text can rarely be reduced to purely scientific or political implications, according to Burke. Rhetoric forms our social identity by a series of events usually based on linguistics, but more generally by the use of any symbolic figures. He uses the metaphor of a drama to articulate this point, where interdependent characters speak and communicate with each other while allowing the others to do the same. Burke also describes identification as a function of persuasive appeal.

Burke defined rhetoric as the "use of words by human agents to form attitudes or to induce actions in other human agents." His definition builds on the preexisting ideas of how people understand the meaning of rhetoric. Burke describes rhetoric as using words to move people or encourage action. Furthermore, he described rhetoric as almost synonymous with persuasion (A Rhetoric of Motives, 1950). Burke argued that rhetoric works to bring about change in people. This change can be evident through attitude, motives, or intentions, but it can also be physical. Calling for help is an act of rhetoric. Rhetoric is symbolic action that calls people to physical action. Ultimately, rhetoric and persuasion are interchangeable, according to Burke. Other scholars have similar definitions. Aristotle argued that rhetoric was a tool for persuading people (but also for gaining information) if the speaker knew how. One way in which Aristotle formed his arguments was through syllogism. Another example of how rhetoric was used to persuade was deliberative discourse. Here, politicians and lawyers used speech to pass or reject policies. Sally Gearhart states that rhetoric uses persuasion to induce change. Although she argues that persuasion is violent and harmful, she uses it as a tool herself to bring about change.

== Philosophy ==
The political and social power of symbols was central to Burke's scholarship. He felt that through understanding "what is involved when we say what people are doing and why they are doing it", we gain insight into the cognitive basis for our perception of the world. For Burke, the way in which we decide to narrate gives importance to specific qualities over others. He believed this tells us a great deal about how we see the world.

=== Dramatism ===
Burke called the social and political rhetorical analysis "dramatism" and believed that such an approach to language analysis and language usage helps us understand the basis of conflict, the virtues and dangers of cooperation, and the opportunities of identification and consubstantiality.

Burke defined the rhetorical function of language as "a symbolic means of inducing cooperation in beings that by nature respond to symbols." His definition of humanity states that "man" is "the symbol using, making, and mis-using animal, inventor of the negative, separated from his natural condition by instruments of his own making, goaded by the spirit of hierarchy, and rotten with perfection." For Burke, some of the most significant problems in human behavior result from instances of symbols using human beings rather than human beings using symbols.

Burke proposed that when we attribute motives to others, we tend to rely on ratios between five elements: act, scene, agent, agency, and purpose. This has become known as the dramatistic pentad. The pentad is grounded in his dramatistic method, which considers human communication as a form of action. Dramatism "invites one to consider the matter of motives in a perspective that, being developed from the analysis of drama, treats language and thought primarily as modes of action" (Grammar of Motives, xxii). Burke pursued literary criticism not as a formalistic enterprise but rather as an enterprise with significant sociological impact; he saw literature as "equipment for living," offering folk wisdom and common sense to people and thus guiding the way they lived their lives.

=== Rebirth cycle ===
Through the use of dramatism, one can ultimately utilize Burke's Rebirth Cycle. This cycle encompasses three distinct phases, Guilt/Pollution, Purification, and Redemption. Burke introduced the phases and their functionality through the use of a poem: "Here are the steps / In the Iron Law of History / That welds Order and Sacrifice / Order leads to Guilt / (For who can keep commandments!) / Guilt needs Redemption (for who would not be cleaned!) / Redemption needs Redeemer (which is to say, a Victim!) / Order / Through Guilt / To Victimage (hence: Cult of the Kill)". The poem provides a basis of for the interactions of the three phases. Order's introduction into the life of human enables the creation of guilt. To alleviate the results produced by the creation of Guilt, redemption is necessary. Through the abstraction of redemption, Burke leads to the completion of the cycle.

Pollution initially constitutes actions that result in the creation of Guilt. The creation of Guilt occurs upon the rejection of a hierarchy. Challenges to relationships, changes in power, and appropriateness of behaviors to change are each contributing factors toward the formation of Guilt. It is appropriate to draw parallels between the creation of Guilt and original sin. Original sin constitutes "an offense that cannot be avoided or a condition in which all people share". Guilt represents the initial action that strips a situation of its perceived purity. The establishment of Guilt necessarily leads to the need to undergo purification to cleanse the individual affected by its recognition. Purification is thus accomplished through two forms of "ritual purification." Mortification and victimage represent the available avenues of purification.

Stratification within society created by hierarchies allows for marginalization within societies. Marginalization thus is a leading factor in the creation of Guilt, and leads to the need for mortification. Burke wrote, "In an emphatic way, mortification is the exercising of oneself in 'virtue'; it is a systematic way of saying no to Disorder, or obediently saying yes to Order". Mortification allows self-sacrifice, which enables one to rid oneself of impurities. Purification will only be reached if it is equal to one's degree of guilt. If mortification cannot be reached, one will ultimately be forced to project "his conflict upon a scapegoat, by 'passing the buck,' by seeking a sacrificial vessel upon which he can vent, as from without, a turmoil that is actually within". Sacrificial vessels allow for the extermination of one's Guilt while enabling one to remain virtuous. Victimage is the second form of ritual purification. Burke highlights society's need to rectify division within its ranks. He wrote, "People so dislike the idea of division, their dislike can easily be turned against the man or group who would so much as name it, let alone proposing to act upon it". Victimage allows the creation of a scapegoat that serves as a depository of impurities in order to protect against entities that are alien to a particular society. The scapegoat takes on the sins of the impure, thus allowing redemption for the Guilty party. Through the course of these actions the scapegoat is harnessed with the sins of the Guilty.

Redemption is reached through one of two options. Tragic redemption revolves around the idea that guilt combines with the principles of perfection and substitution in order that victimage can be utilized. This can be viewed as the "guilty is removed from the rhetorical community through either scapegoating or mortification". Comic enlightenment is the second form of redemption. This option allows the sins of the guilty to be adopted by Society as a whole, ultimately making Society guilty by association.

=== Terministic screen ===
Another key concept for Burke is the Terministic screen—a set of symbols that becomes a kind of screen or grid of intelligibility through which the world makes sense to us. Here Burke offers rhetorical theorists and critics a way of understanding the relationship between language and ideology. Language, Burke thought, doesn't simply "reflect" reality; it also helps select reality as well as deflect reality. In Language as Symbolic Action (1966), he writes, "Even if any given terminology is a reflection of reality, by its very nature as a terminology it must be a selection of reality; and to this extent must function also as a deflection of reality. Burke describes terministic screens as reflections of reality—we see these symbols as things that direct our attention to the topic at hand. For example, photos of the same object with different filters each direct the viewer's attention differently, much like how different subjects in academia grab the attention differently. Burke states, "We must use terministic screens, since we can't say anything without the use of terms; whatever terms we use, they necessarily constitute a corresponding kind of screen; and any such screen necessarily directs the attention to one field rather than another." Burke drew not only from the works of Shakespeare and Sophocles, but from films and radio that were important to pop culture, because they were teeming with "symbolic and rhetorical ingredients." We as a people can be cued to accept the screen put in front of us, and mass culture such as TV and websites can be to blame for this. Media today has altered terministic screens, or as Richard Toye wrote in his book Rhetoric: A Very Short Introduction, the "linguistic filters which cause us to see situations in particular fashions."

=== Identification ===
Burke viewed identification as a critical element of persuasion. According to Burke, as we listen to someone speak, we gauge how similar that person is to us. If our opinions match, then we identify (rhetorically) with the speaker. Based on how much we identify with the speaker, we may be moved to accept the conclusions that the speaker comes to in an argument, as well as all (or most) of its implications. In A Rhetoric of Motives, Burke not only explores self-identification within a rhetorical context, but also analyzes exterior identification, such as identifying with objects and concepts that are not the self. There are several other facets to identification that Burke discusses within his books, such as consubstantiality, property, autonomy, and cunning.

Burke's exploration of identification within rhetoric heavily influenced modern rhetorical theory. He revolutionized rhetoric in the West with his exploration of identification, arguing that rhetoric is not only about "rational argument plus emotion", but also that it involves people connecting to language and one another at the same time. Burke’s theory of identification was complicated by his critical interest in music, prompting a shift toward distinguishing between form and information in sonic identification.

== Principal works ==
In "Definition of Man", the first essay of his collection Language as Symbolic Action (1966), Burke defined humankind as a "symbol using animal" (p. 3). This definition of man, he argued, means that "reality" has actually "been built up for us through nothing but our symbol systems" (p. 5). Without our encyclopedias, atlases, and other assorted reference guides, we would know little about the world that lies beyond our immediate sensory experience. What we call "reality," Burke stated, is actually a "clutter of symbols about the past combined with whatever things we know mainly through maps, magazines, newspapers, and the like about the present ... a construct of our symbol systems" (p. 5). College students wandering from class to class, from English literature to sociology to biology to calculus, encounter a new reality each time they enter a classroom; the courses listed in a university's catalogue "are in effect but so many different terminologies" (p. 5). It stands to reason then that people who consider themselves to be Christian, and who internalize that religion's symbol system, inhabit a reality that is different from the one of practicing Buddhists, or Jews, or Muslims. The same would hold true for people who believe in the tenets of free market capitalism or socialism, Freudian psychoanalysis or Jungian depth psychology, as well as mysticism or materialism. Each belief system has its own vocabulary to describe how the world works and what things mean, thus presenting its adherents with a specific reality.

Burke's poetry (which has drawn little critical attention and seldom been anthologized) appears in three collections: Book of Moments (1955), Collected Poems 1915–1967 (1968), and the posthumously published Late Poems: 1968-1993 Attitudinizings Verse-wise, While Fending for One's Selph, and in a Style Somewhat Artificially Colloquial (2005). His fiction is collected in Here & Elsewhere: The Collected Fiction of Kenneth Burke (2005).

His other principal works are

- Counter-Statement (1931)
- "Towards a Better Life" (1932), Googlebooks preview, pp. 25–233 not shown.
- Permanence and Change (1935)
- Attitudes Toward History (1937)
- The Rhetoric of Hitler's "Battle" (1939)
- Philosophy of Literary Form (1941)
- A Grammar of Motives (1945)
- A Rhetoric of Motives (1950)
- Linguistic Approaches to Problems of Education (1955)
- The Rhetoric of Religion (1961)
- Language As Symbolic Action (1966)
- Dramatism and Development (1972): a description of the contents of the two part lecture devoted to biological, psychological and sociocultural phenomena
- Here and Elsewhere (2005)
- Essays Toward a Symbolic of Motives (2006)
- Kenneth Burke on Shakespeare (2007)
- Full list of his works from KB: The Journal of the Kenneth Burke Society

He also wrote the song "One Light in a Dark Valley," later recorded by his grandson Harry Chapin.

Burke's most notable correspondence is collected here:

- Jay, Paul, editor, The Selected Correspondence of Kenneth Burke and Malcolm Cowley, 1915-1981, New York: Viking, 1988, ISBN 0-670-81336-2
- East, James H., editor, The Humane Particulars: The Collected Letters of William Carlos Williams and Kenneth Burke, Columbia: U of South Carolina P, 2004.
- Rueckert, William H., editor, Letters from Kenneth Burke to William H. Rueckert, 1959–1987, Anderson, SC: Parlor Press, 2003. ISBN 0-9724772-0-9

== Honors ==
Burke was awarded the National Medal for Literature at the American Book Awards in 1981. According to The New York Times, April 20, 1981, "The $15,000 award, endowed in memory of the late Harold Guinzberg, founder of the Viking Press, honors a living American writer 'for a distinguished and continuing contribution to American letters.'" In 1987 the New Jersey State Senate issued a proclamation on his 90th birthday celebrating his contributions to literature and the arts.
