= Dramatism =

Interpretive communication studies theory

Dramatism, a rhetorical theory, was developed by Kenneth Burke as a tool for analyzing human relationships through the use of language. Burke viewed dramatism from the lens of logology, which studies how people's ways of speaking shape their attitudes towards the world. According to this theory, the world is a stage where all the people present are actors and their actions parallel a drama. Burke then correlates dramatism with motivation, saying that people are "motivated" to behave in response to certain situations, similar to how actors in a play are motivated to behave or function. Burke discusses two important ideas – that life is drama, and the ultimate motive of rhetoric is the purging of guilt. Burke recognized guilt as the base of human emotions and motivations for action. As cited in "A Note on Burke on "Motive"", the author recognized the importance of "motive" in Burke's work. In "Kenneth Burke's concept of motives in rhetorical theory", the authors mentioned that Burke believes that guilt, "combined with other constructs, describes the totality of the compelling force within an event which explains why the event took place."

Dramatism consists of three broad concepts —the pentad, identification, and the guilt-purification-redemption cycle. The entry then considers five major areas in which scholars in a variety of fields apply dramatism: the dramaturgical self, motivation and drama, social relationships as dramas, organizational dramas, and political dramas.

To understand people's movement and intentions, the theorist sets up the Dramatistic Pentad strategy for viewing life, not as life itself, by comparing each social unit involved in human activities as five elements of drama – act, scene, agent, agency, and purpose, to answer the empirical question of how persons explain their actions, and to find the ultimate motivations of human activities.

"Dramatism is treated as a technique for analyzing language as a mode of action in which specialized nomenclatures are recognized, each with particular ends and insights."

== Background and assumptions ==
=== Background ===
Kenneth Burke was an established literary critic who has contributed immensely to rhetoric theory. Originally influenced by Shakespeare and Aristotle's rhetoric, he developed his theory of Dramatism, separating himself from the two by adding the importance of motive. Dramatism went on to be immensely important to communication studies and in understanding how language shapes perception. Some argue that he was slightly ahead of his time when it came to his intense interdisciplinary approach to his theory. Using his classical education of literature and rhetoric as a foundation, Dramatism was largely influenced by the philosophies of Karl Marx, Friedrich Nietzsche, and Sigmund Freud. Burke was said to refer to the work of Parsons, as well as of social thinkers such as Max Weber, Georg Simmel, Alfred Schütz and G.H. Mead, all of whom wrote extensively regarding social action. The joining of these ideologies pushed Burke's work from literary to cultural criticism.

=== Influence of World War II ===
In the years that Burke was working on crafting Dramatism, the second World War waged on, providing great context to his Grammar of Motives by explaining the implications of motive on action and human communication. Burke called this war the "mightiest war the human race will ever experience". This war played a major role in "rhetorizing" Dramatism. He wrote extensively about the war and its social, political and literary aspects which led him to create this theory. Dramatism emerged as the antithesis to war - it encouraged a poetic dialectic and variations in perspectives in order to come to a joint conclusion to appease all. This came as an opposition to how wars functioned, with "monolithic certainty in the rule of the strongman" and with the need for complete obedience.

=== Drama as a metaphor ===
The use of drama as a metaphor in order to understand human behavior and motivation forms the basis for this theory. According to West, there are three basic reasons that drama is a useful metaphor to the idea of Dramatism.

1. Drama indicates a wide range of human experience.
2. There are typical genres that drama follows, which are similar to ways of communicating in human lives.
3. Drama is closely related to audiences, which shows the struggles of audiences and also provides suggestions.

It is possible because Burke believes that Drama has recognizable genres. Humans use language as action in patterned discourses, and texts move us with recurring patterns underlying those texts. And drama has certain audiences, which means rhetoric plays a crucial role when humans deal with experiences. Language strategies are central to Burke's dramatistic approach.

This does not necessarily imply that Dramatism is also entirely metaphorical. Critics as well as Burke have debated whether this theory is literal or metaphorical.

=== Assumptions ===
Because of the complexity and extension of Burke's thinking, it is difficult to label the ontology behind his theory.

However, some basic assumptions can still be extracted to support the understanding of dramatism.

1. Some of what we do is motivated by animality and some of it by symbolicity. A human's purpose for drinking water is to satisfy thirst, which is an animal need; while the action of reading papers is influenced by symbols. Burke's position is that both animal nature and symbols motivate us. For him, of all the symbols, language is the most important. Barry Brummett shares a similar idea in his book Landmark Essays on Kenneth Burke, that "teeters between the realizations that some of what we do is motivated by animality and some of it by symbolicity (p. xii)."
2. When we use language, we are used by it as well. Burke held a concept of linguistic relativity similar to the Sapir-Whorf hypothesis . Words set our concepts and opinions, which means people cannot see beyond what their words lead them to believe. This assumption suggests that language exerts a determining influence over people, which means meanwhile people's propositions are often restricted to be polarized by language, because some language cannot express much nuance of opinion.
3. We humans are choice makers. Agency is another key point of dramatism; "The essence of agency is choice." Social actors have the ability of acting out of choices.

== Key concepts ==
=== 1. Dramatistic Pentad ===
==== Pentad ====
The dramatistic pentad is an instrument used as a set of relational or functional principles that could help us understand what he calls the 'cycle cluster of terms' people use to attribute motive. This pentad is a dissolution to drama. It is parallel with Aristotle's four causes and has a similar correlation to journalists' catechism: who, what, when, where, why, and how. This is done through the five key elements of human drama – act, scene, agent, agency, and purpose. The Pentad is a simple tool for seeing and understanding the complexity of a situation. It reveals the nuances and complications of language as symbolic action, which in turn, opens up our perspective. These elements can be applied to various disciplines and be converted to their own methodology.

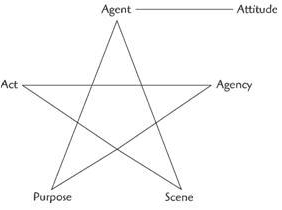
Dramatism Pentad

- Act: "What", what has done. According to Burke, "the act" of the Pentad is which "names what took place, in thought or deed."
- Scene: "When" and "Where". According to Burke, "the scene" is defined as "the background of an act, the situation in which it occurred."
- Agent: "by Whom", who did it. Burke defines the "agent" as "what person or kind of person performed the act."
- Agency: "How", which is associated with methods and technologies. Burke defines the "agency" as "what instrument or instruments he used."
- Purpose: "Why", why it happened. This is associate with the motive behind the behavior, which is the main focus of the analysis.
- Attitude: The preparation prior to performing an act

==== From the pentad to the hexad ====
Over time, Burke realized that his pentad needed a sixth element, thereby turning it into a hexad. In the 1969 edition of Grammar, Burke added a new element, 'Attitude Frame'. Attitude means "the preparation for an act, which would make it a kind of symbolic act, or incipient act." Burke created this in order to account for the complexity of a responses that may arise within an audience. He includes Attitude as an aspect of his writings about Frame.

It can be used in place of an act or be the precedent to an act. Mead's writings were interpreted by Burke as "delayed action", wherein people can arouse a change in attitude in themselves as well as others through verbal communication. Burke goes on to agree that attitude is impacted by social surroundings as well as verbal actions. Attitudes can influence how a person acts. It is the conscious, calculated step in the pause before an act.

===== Pentad in action =====
David Ling used the Pentad elements to evaluate Senator Edward (Ted) Kennedy's now-infamous speech in 1969 to persuade the audiences to see him as a victim of his family curse instead of the one who should be responsible for an accident which caused death of Mary Jo Kopechne. From Kennedy's statement, Ling recognized several elements from the Pentad:

Kennedy's response to the Chappaquiddick Incident:

- Act: The failure to immediately report a fatal accident and its causes
- Scene: The events surrounding Mary Jo Kopechne and the event's time in history
- Agent: Senator Ted Kennedy
- Agency: The method by which Kennedy eventually reported his involvement in the incident
- Purpose: To fulfill legal and moral responsibilities
- Attitude: The circumstances were out of Kennedy's control and his family history negatively contributed

Kennedy denied his relationship with the dead woman, described his survival as a fate, and described the difficulty of rescuing the woman at the scene. He pivoted the fact and described it as a circumstance that he couldn't control. Ultimately, Kennedy escaped the incident with very little damage to his social and political capital as demonstrated by the continuation of his 40-year career in the U.S. Senate. These events were eventually adapted into John Curran's film Chappaquiddick in 2018.

==== Dramatistic ratios ====
Dramatistic ratios are the "proportions of one element relative to another in the Dramatism Pentad", which can be used to find the dominant element in the interaction.

Any complete statement about motives will offer some kind of answers to the five questions above. While it is important to understand each element of the pentad on its own, it is more important to understand how the elements work together. This is called a ratio, and there are ten possible ratios within the Pentad. Burke maintained that analyzing the ratios of a speaker's presentation would expose the resources of ambiguity people might exploit to interpret complex problems. The most common ratios used by Burke are Scene-Act and Scene-Agent. When engaged in a dramatistic study, he notes, "the basic unit of action would be defined as 'the human body in conscious or purposive motion'", which is an agent acting in a situation. There is a correlation drawn between how act and agent determine the scene which therefore creates the purpose of the topic. Relating the pentadic elements together can show how ratios are utilized in identifying themes.

=== 2. Identification ===
Identification is the basic function of sociality, using both positive and negative associations. When there is overlap between two people in terms of their substance, they have identification. On the other hand, division is the lack of overlap between two people in matters of essence. According to Burke, identification is an inevitable, thus both beneficial and detrimental characteristic of language in human relations. Identification has the following features:

==== The chief notion of a "new rhetoric" ====
Examining Aristotle's principles of rhetoric, Burke points out that the definition of the "old rhetoric" is, in essence, persuasion. Correspondingly, Burke proposes a new rhetoric, which discusses several issues, but mainly focuses on the notion of identification. In comparison with "old" rhetoric, which stresses on deliberate design, "new" rhetoric may include partially "unconscious" factors in its appeal.

New rhetoric includes the intention of the actor and the interpretation of the audience. As an audience, it is impossible to know the intended message of an actor. The performance must therefore be interpreted by the audience to allow for identification of the actor. Rhetorical awareness is the ability to apply the concepts of audience and actor to real life scenarios.

Burke's concept of new rhetoric has also been expanded in various academic disciplines. For example, in 2015 philosophers Rutten & Soetaert used the new rhetoric concept to study changing attitudes in regards to education as a way to better understand if Burke's ideas can be applied to this arena.

Burke's new rhetoric has also been used to understand the women's equality movement, specifically in regards to the education of women and sharing of knowledge through print media. Academic Amlong deconstructed print medias of the 1800s addressing human rights as an aspect of educating women about the women's rights movement.

==== Generated when two people's substances overlap ====
Burke asserts that all things have substance, which he defines as the general nature of something. Identification is a recognized common ground between two people's substances, regarding physical characteristics, talents, occupation, experiences, personality, beliefs, and attitudes. The more substance two people share, the greater the identification. It is used to overcome human division.

==== Can be falsified to result in homophily ====
Sometimes the speaker tries to falsely identify with the audience, which results in homophily for the audience. Homophily is the perceived similarity between speaker and listener. The so-called "I" is merely a unique combination of potentially conflicting corporate "we's". For example, the use of the people rather than the worker would more clearly tap into the lower middle-class values of the audience the movement was trying to reach.

==== Reflects ambiguities of substance ====
Burke recognizes that identification rests on both unity and division, since no one's substance can completely overlap with others. Individuals are "both joined and separated". Humans can unite on certain aspects of substance but at the same time remain unique, which is labeled as "ambiguities". Identification can be increased by the process of consubstantiation, which refers to bridging divisions between two people. Rhetoric is needed in this process to build unity.

=== 3. Guilt and redemption ===
According to Burke, guilt redemption is considered the plot of all human drama, or the root of all rhetoric. He defined the "guilt" as "the theological doctrine of Original Sin". As cited in Littlejohn, Burke sees guilt as "all-purpose word for any feeling of tension within a person—anxiety, embarrassment, self-hatred, disgust and the like."

In this perspective, Burke concluded that the ultimate motivation of man is to purge oneself of one's sense of guilt through public speaking. The term guilt covers tension, anxiety, shame, disgust, embarrassment, and other similar feelings. Guilt serves as a motivating factor that drives the human drama.

Burke's cycle refers to the process of feeling guilt and attempting to reduce it, which follows a predictable pattern: order (or hierarchy), the negative, victimage (scapegoat or mortification), and redemption.

==== Order or hierarchy ====
Society is a dramatic process in which hierarchy forms structure through power relationships. The structure of social hierarchy considered in terms of the communication of superiority, inferiority and equality. The hierarchy is created through language use, which enables people to create categories. Individuals feel guilt as a result of their place in the hierarchy.

==== The negative ====
The negative comes into play when people see their place in the social order and seek to reject it. Saying no to the existing order is both a function of our language abilities and evidence of humans as choice makers. Burke coined the phrase "rotten with perfection", which means that because our symbols allow us to imagine perfection, we always feel guilty about the difference between the reality and the perfection.

==== Victimage ====
Victimage is the way that we try to redeem the guilt. There are two ways of victimage. The way of turning the guilt into ourselves is called mortification. It is engaged when we apologize or blame ourselves when facing the wrongdoing; the way of turning the guilt to external parties is called scapegoating. According to Burke, there are two different types of scapegoating, universal and fractional. In universal scapegoating, the speaker blames everyone for the problem, so the audience associates and even feels sorry for the victim, because it includes themselves. In fractional scapegoating, the speaker blames a specific group or a specific person for their problems. This creates a division within the audience. The victim, whoever it may be, is vilified, or made up to violate the ideals of social order, like normalcy or decency. As a result, people who take action against the villains become heroized because they are confronting evil.

==== Redemption ====
This is a confession of guilt by the speaker and a request for forgiveness. Normally, these people are sentenced to a certain punishment so they can reflect and realize their sins. This punishment is specifically a kind of "death", literally or figuratively.

Many speakers experience a combination of these two guilt-purging options. The ongoing cycle starts with order. The order is the status quo, where everything is right with the world. Then pollution disrupts the order. The pollution is the guilt or sin. Then casuistic stretching allows the guilt to be accepted into the world. Next, is the guilt, which is the effect of the pollution. After that, is victimage or mortification which purges the guilt. Finally comes transcendence which is new order, the now status quo.

== Emphasis on symbolic constitution ==
Burke defined the rhetorical function of language as "a symbolic means of inducing cooperation in beings that by nature respond to symbols." When talking about how the use of language can alter one's perceptions and beliefs entirely, Burke also wrote extensively about how symbolic action can even push man to war.

"Dramatism defines language as symbolic action." At the very core of this theory and throughout its subsequent applications and critiques, there is a common underlying emphasis on symbolic interactionism and its impact on how the theory is perceived. Burke's goal is to explain the whole of human experience with symbolic interaction. He addresses how symbolic understanding can help encourage motives. Burke emphasizes how the "reality" that we construct for ourselves is generated and altered through the use of symbols, which in turn affects language and ultimately motive.

A terministic screen is when the presenter is able to influence the audience's perception of information through strategic placement of elements. Swaying interpretation and distorting perceptions is central to Burke's dramatistic approach.

== Major areas of application ==
Dennis Brissett and Charles Edgley examine the utility of dramatism on different levels, which can be categorized as the following dimensions:

=== 1. The dramaturgical self ===
Dramaturgical perspective is vividly used to analyze human individuality. It views individuality as more a social rather than a psychological phenomenon. The concept of a dramaturgical self as formulated by sociologist Erving Goffman was inspired by the theatre, and also finds roots in relations to Burke's work. Specifically, the concept of dramaturgy ideates life as a metaphorical theater, differentiating from Burke's concept of life as a theater itself.

Some examples of classic research questions on the topic involve how people maximize or minimize the expressiveness, how one stage ideal self, the process of impression-management, etc. For example, Larson and Zemke described the roots of the ideation and patterning of temporal socialization which is drawn from biological rhythms, values and beliefs, work and social commitments, cultural beliefs and engagement in activity.

=== 2. Motivation and drama ===
Motives play a crucial role in social interaction between an acting person and his or her validating audience. Within the dramaturgical frame, people are rationalizing. Scholars try to provide a way of understanding how the various identities which comprise the self are constructed. For example, Anderson and Swainson tried to find the answer of whether rape is motivated by sex or by power.

=== 3. Social relationships as dramas ===
As with any drama, there is the need for an audience to perform for. Within social contexts, this addresses how people encourage or discourage behaviors of others in the social group. Dramatists also concern the ways in which people both facilitate and interfere with the ongoing behavior of others. The emphasis is on the expressive nature of the social bond. Some topics as role taking, role distance are discussed. For example, by analyzing public address, scholars examine why a speaker selects a certain strategy to identify with audience. For example, Orville Gilbert Brim, Jr. analyzed data to interpret how group structure and role learning influence children's understanding of gender.

=== 4. Organizational dramas ===
In addition to focusing on the negotiated nature of social organization, dramaturgy emphasizes the manner in which the social order is expressed through social interaction, how social organization is enacted, featured and dramatized. Typical research topics include corporate realm, business influence on federal policy agenda, even funerals and religious themes. For example, by examining the decision making criteria of Business Angels, Baron and Marksman identified four social skills which contribute to entrepreneurial success: social perception; persuasion and social influence; social adaptability and impression management. They employ dramatism to show how these skills are critical in raising finance.

=== 5. Political dramas ===
It is acknowledged that the political process has become more and more a theatrical, image-mongering, dramatic spectacle worthy of a show-business metaphor on a grand scale. Scholars study how dramaturgical materials create essential images by analyzing political advertising and campaigns, stagecraft-like diplomacy, etc. Dramatism provides reasoning for decisions and the persuasion of elections. For example, Philip.E.Tetlock tried to answer why presidents became more complex in their thinking after winning the campaign. He found the reason is not presidents' own cognitive adjustment, but a means of impression management.

== In popular culture ==
Dramatism provides us a new way to understand people. Though Dramatism has some clear hindrances, many argue that Kenneth Burke and his theories are "still worth reading." Oratory and how and what people say continue to drive daily life continuing the usefulness of dramatistic analysis in a variety of fields.

=== Advertising ===
- Through the use of identification, the goal of celebrity endorsement is to create a perceived similarity between the consumer and the actor. It is the actor's job, through the use of dramatism, to create this perceived similarity and influence the consumer to purchase the product.
- The pentad was utilized to discover the persuasive elements of Mary Kay's influence. Traits such as determination, imagination, passion, integrity, and courage were evaluated using each pentad element. The efficacy of these traits is what develops the speaker's ability to persuade an audience. This technique can be used to evaluate other influencers.
- When it comes to audience and advertisement, there may be different strategies involved. When promoting tourism, the Official Penang Tourism account utilized agent to promote their city as inviting and exciting. When influencers promoted tourism to Penang, they appealed to act instead. They used poses and editing to influence viewers. The appeal to a certain pentadic element can influence the audience's perception as well as the effectiveness of advertisement.
- There are three elements that can impact the ability of a influencer to effectively influence their audience: authenticity, confidence, and interactivity. These three attributes pertain the identification step in Burke's dramatism. The ability of an influencer to portray their honest self in a trustworthy manner as well as providing the audience with the chance to experience the benefits will determine their effectiveness.

=== Communication and public relations ===
- Rempel Denise applies Dramatism to explore the social networking site MySpace. She analyzed the architecture of MySpace, the identity presentation of users and the audience reception and finds out that legitimate communication is impossible, and consequently, cannot lead the users to act consubstantially.
- The fundamentals of public relations, much to Burke's dismay, are very closely related to the key concept of Identification within Dramatism theory. The ability to recognize common ground between a speaker and his audience is vital in achieving effective persuasion and the ability to shift a particular narrative or "drama."
- Dramatism can be applied to social movements and symbolism. Burke's ideas allow the audience to evaluate the persuasive and manipulation elements of public address.
- Mordini says social media has developed into a global stage where actors are able to use Burke's elements to create an ideal perception of themselves to an audience. The intentionality of this reality is sometimes realized. Everyone that utilizes social media is contributing either as the audience or an actor themselves.
- When utilizing "I" within a speech, it was discovered that it falls into the pentadic element of agent. This is because the use of "I" actualizes the audience to utilize their free will and take action. A sermon given to promote the black lives matter movement utilized this strategy.
- The pentad can be used to identify themes but also concerns. By compiling complains and requests, main problems and approaches can be identified to best serve the community.

=== Culture ===
- Gregory Clark addressed the Pentad to look into the sharing places in the United States. He concluded that tourism sites, which work as the scene in Pentad, have the tendency to differentiate American people from other culture and therefore established a sense of national identity in terms of a common culture.

=== COVID-19 ===
- During the COVID-19 pandemic, identification was essential to provide the community with a sense of understanding and credibility. The divide between countries was viewed most prominently by media coverage of national border communities. A study was performed to evaluate Norway's ability to create a sense of identification during the time of a crisis. Strategies such as shaping community and division were used to educate and unite the citizens of Norway. It was also found that the ability of the politician to validate the emotions of citizens ultimately impacted the effectiveness of their communication.
- When promoting vaccinations during the COVID-19 pandemic, the dramatistic pentad was applied to identify meaningful persuasion strategies. The campaigns that were able to identify with the concerns of the viewers as well as motivate the audience to take action were the most effective. The use of the terms "we" and "you" were found to create agent in these scenarios and motivate consumers to take action. This strategy allows for the companies to validate themselves as trustworthy before providing a plan of action.

=== English ===
- Burke's technical term for drama representative anecdote indicates that the compositionist's adage gives appropriate examples covers the case adequately. Winterowd suggests writers should present ideas dramatistically, not relying on argument and demonstration alone but grounding their abstractions in the concreteness of what being called as representative anecdotes. Representative anecdote means conceptual pivot and is equated with a family of terms: enthymeme, thesis, topic sentence, theme. The representative anecdote, can be either support or conceptual pivot, and in the case of drama is both support and conceptual pivot.

=== Healthcare, therapy, and social work ===
- In 2014, a methadone maintenance treatment center in Copenhagen applied Dramatism to staff member feedback in order to address their varying degrees of ethical concerns in regards to the center's practices and policies. This treatment center chose Dramatism as a guide because they understood that their staff are all driven by different motives and act and react differently based on their personal history and specific context within the treatment facility. The opportunity to discuss these differences helped staff members, who otherwise do not have any input, understand the driving forces behind the policies set by the center with hopes that understanding made them more effective and knowledgeable practitioners.
- Educational researcher at Ghent University, Kris Rutten chose to apply a dramatistic lens to Milos Forman's film One Flew Over the Cuckoo's Nest because of its relevance to mental health and "disability treatment" to teach his social work students how to approach varying levels of ambiguity in their future practice. This application focused heavily on the dramatistic ratios of the Pentad elements to highlight various hierarchies and power structures showcased in the film's fictional mental health facility and the actions and reactions of the facility staff and patients. In essence, Rutten uses this example to offer "a perspective about perspectives" that ultimately prepare his students of social work for their future in other clinical settings.

=== Politics ===
- David Ling uses the pentad to analyze Senator Edward Ted Kennedy's address to the people of Massachusetts after the Chappaquiddick Incident. He regards the events surrounding the death of Miss Kopechne as the scene, Kennedy himself as the agent, Kennedy's failure to report the accident in time as act, methods to report as agency, and finds out that the purpose for Kennedy is to fulfill his legal and moral duty.
- Another example of dramatism in politics is the use of Burke's rhetorical interpretations as a tool to understand presentations of terrorism in media. Researchers Gurrionero and Canel highlight the use of Burke's understanding of motives and identification within the context of the media's framing of terrorist attacks, saying that the words and symbols used are with specific motives to frame the pentad into the voice that benefits the media and viewers at the expense of the acclaimed terrorists.
- The dramatistic pentad can be utilized to identify narratives in policy. The pentad was used to analyze Canadian policy of climate change from 2015 to 2021. The ratio of the elements is what allows for this analysis to occur. There was the highest ratio of "scene" which related to the innovation and proposition of solutions from the government.

=== Popular art ===
- Dwight Macdonald and Ernest Van Den Haag views that popular (or "mass"-) culture functions not as Scene, as one might ordinarily expect, but as Agency. "Masscult" itself is the force involved in the Act of brainwashing the public into accepting lower standards of art. This Act is accomplished with the "Sub-Agency" of modern electronic technology, the mass media.

=== Scientific research ===
- As ethical concerns continue to move to the forefront of research concerns, Warren Bowen dedicated his doctoral thesis exploring the widely held acceptance that Burke's Pentad applies only to humans. Bowen raises the question, 'what happens when animals are the scene of a particular issue?'. Much of the research using animal testing fails to hold animal interests at the same level as their human counterparts, therefore ignoring some of the non-verbal cues or other symbolic feedback that would otherwise indicate distress. The scene:agent ratio here is clearly skewed. Ultimately Bowen shines a light on the extremely subjective nature of the Pentad and the power that humans hold over other beings that do not communicate in the same way.

=== Sociology ===
- Some researchers, such as Robert Wade Kenny, addressed the use of the Pentad and Dramatism to look into the field of sociology. As Kenny states, that the pentad can be used to examine sociology because, "sociology is predicated on the notion that human action is neither random nor mystical, and this sets up the initial condition necessary for an inquiry into the motivating principles that give rise to social order and disorder." He stated that sociology is a study of human action, human behavior and lifeworld "must be in play", and the behaviors are motivated, so the dramatism elements can be applied to sociology field.

== Critiques ==
Burke's dramatism has been a great contribution to the communication field, which is praised by many researchers in this area. Chesebro commented on Burke's work that "few critics have revealed the scope, imagination, insights, and dazzling concern for symbol using which Kenneth Burke possesses (Chesebro, 1993, p. xii)". The New York Times described Burke as a leading critic in the US, stating that Burke is recognized "as a major influence on critics like Harold Bloom and writers like Ralph Ellison". Burke's work is widely praised and has influenced a significant number of researchers as well as students in the communication field.

There have been, however, criticisms of his work. Some of the most obvious being in regard to Burke's overall negative approach to interpersonal relationships. Within the Modern Rhetorical Criticism text, authors Hart, Saughton, and Lavally argue that Burke " look[ed] to the inevitable divisions among people and between people and their personal goals" when in reality relationships operate in the gray.

=== Focus on criticism over composition ===
Charles Kneupper states that several concerns arise when applying dramatism to the process of composition. He presses on the need to consider the shortcomings of this theory. The theory can be examined by the criteria below:

- Scope The theory of Dramatism is criticized for being too broad in scope because it aims to explain how humans interact with each other using symbols, which has been described as a general explanation that almost has no meaning as some critics believe.
- Parsimony Relatedly, some critique Burke’s theory as lacking parsimony, meaning it is unclear and too large to be useful.
- Utility Other theorists argue that Dramatism lacks utility because it leaves out topics of gender and culture. Notably, Burke included women in his theory (unlike much of scholarship at the time), but feminist scholars, like Condit, found Burke's concepts inadequate to their critical concerns, by using the generic "man" to represent all people.

=== Feminist critiques ===
Feminist scholars also talked about our ability as a society to begin to think in new ways about sex and gender, to extent our language beyond duality to a broad "humanity" and to "human beings". Since "being" is a state in which women simply experience life as freely, consciously, and fully as possible, realizing that this is not only the purpose of life but a genuine place from which change can occur. Condit also went on to criticize Burke for assuming culture as a hegemony, specifically in relation to Burke's application of guilt purging within cultures as necessitating victims.

Later scholars, such as Anne Caroline Crenshaw, went on to note that Burke did identify gender relations in one instance in relation to his arguments on social hierarchies through his analysis of socio-sexual relations present in Shakespeare's Venus and Adonis. However, this author notes that Burke's work wasn't a critique and examination of this relationship through dramatism, but the theory of dramatism does give space to make such analyses. Furthermore, scholar Brenda Robinson Hancock used Burke's dramatism to study women's movements, specifically with identification as actors. Another scholar, Janet Brown, made use of Burke's pentad in relation to understanding and identifications of feminist literature. Despite these works and incorporation of dramatism in feminist work, there remains the evidence that Burke did not use or intend his theory to account for gender.

=== Ontological and literal or epistemological and metaphorical ===
Another critique of the theory is to ask whether the theory exists as a metaphorical or literal theory. In his work, Burke emphasizes that Dramatism is not epistemological but ontological and literal. However, Burkean scholars have argued time and time again that Dramatism is in fact, metaphorical and epistemological.

Burke staunchly argued that his theory of dramatism is a literal theory, understanding reality as a literal stage with actors and enactment. He bases his conclusion on two claims:

1) Dramatism is ontological because it indicates language as "action" and as a representation.

2) The aforementioned point can be identified as literal because the approach to this topic is whole.

The reasoning for Burke to emphasize his theory as literal relates to the reasons to why others claim it to be metaphorical: the issue lies in the understanding of language's power as a symbol itself. Burke emphasizes the power and impact of literal speech in addition to the recognition of the possibility of the theory as metaphorical. However, future theorists, specifically Bernard Brock and Herbert W. Simons, went on to argue dramatism as metaphorical theory claiming that Burke's idea that all the world's a stage is mere a tool of symbolic interaction that signals life as a drama.
