= Narrative paradigm =

Communication theory

Narrative paradigm is a communication theory conceptualized by 20th-century communication scholar Walter Fisher. The paradigm claims that all meaningful communication occurs via storytelling or reporting of events. Humans participate as storytellers and observers of narratives. This theory further claims that stories are more persuasive than arguments. Essentially the narrative paradigm helps us to explain how humans are able to understand complex information through narrative.

== Background ==
The Narrative Paradigm is a theory that suggests that human beings are natural storytellers and that a good story is more convincing than a good argument. Walter Fisher developed this theory as a solution making cohesive arguments. Fisher conceptualized the paradigm as a way to combat issues in the public sphere. The problem was that human beings were unable to make cohesive traditional arguments. At the time, the rational world paradigm was the theory used to satisfy public controversies. He believed that stories have the power to include a beginning, middle, and end of an argument and that the rational world paradigm fails to be effective in sensemaking.

Fisher uses the term paradigm rather than theory, meaning a paradigm is broader than a theory. Fisher stated, "There is no genre, including technical communication, that is not an episode in the story of life." For this reason, Fisher thought narration to be the ultimate metaphor to encompass the human experience.

Fisher believed that humans are not rational and proposed that the narrative is the basis of communication. Fisher notes that reasoning is achieved through "all sorts of symbolic action." According to this viewpoint, people communicate by telling/observing a compelling story rather than by producing evidence or constructing a logical argument. The narrative paradigm is purportedly all-encompassing, allowing all communication to be looked at as a narrative even though it may not conform to the traditional literary requirements of a narrative. He states:

- Humans see the world as a set of stories. Each accepts stories that match his or her values and beliefs, understood as common sense.
- Although people claim that their decisions are rational, incorporating history, culture, and perceptions about the other people involved, all of these are subjective and incompletely understood.
- Narrative rationality requires stories to be probable, coherent and to exhibit fidelity.

Storytelling is one of the first language skills that children develop. It is universal across cultures and time.

== Rational world paradigm ==
Walter Fisher conceptualized the Narrative Paradigm in direct contrast to the Rational World Paradigm. "Fisher's interest in narrative developed out of his conclusion that the dominant model for explaining human communication—the rational-world paradigm—was inadequate." Rational World Paradigm suggest that an argument is most persuasive when it is logical. This theory is based on the teachings of Plato and Aristotle.

Comparison
Narrative paradigm	Rational world paradigm
1. Humans are storytellers.	1. Humans are rational.
2. Decision making and communication are based on "good reasons".	2. Decision making is based on arguments.
3. Good reasons are determined by matters of history, biography, culture and character.	3. Arguments adhere to specific criteria for soundness and logic.
4. Rationality is based in people's awareness of internal consistency and resemblance to lived experience.	4. Rationality is based on the quality of evidence and formal reasoning processes.
5. We experience a world that is filled with stories, and we must choose among them.	5. The world can be understood as a series of logical relationships that are uncovered through reasoning.

According to Aristotle, some statements are superior to others by virtue of their relationship to true knowledge. This view claims that:

- People are essentially thinking beings, basing their knowledge on evidence-based reasoning.
- Rational argument reflects knowledge and understanding, and how the case is made. These qualities determine whether the argument is accepted, so long as the form matches the forum, which might be scientific, legal, philosophical, etc.
- The world is a set of logical puzzles that can be solved through reason.

== Narrative rationality ==
Narrative rationality requires coherence and fidelity, which contribute to judgments about reasons.

=== Coherence ===
Narrative coherence is the degree to which a story makes sense. Coherent stories are internally consistent, with sufficient detail, strong characters, and free of significant surprises. The ability to assess coherence is learned and improves with experience. Individuals assess a story's adherence by comparing it with similar stories. The ultimate test of narrative sense is whether the characters act reliably. If figures show continuity throughout their thoughts, motives, and actions, acceptance increases. However, characters behaving uncharacteristically destroy acceptance.

=== Fidelity ===
Narrative fidelity is the degree to which a story fits into the observer's experience with other accounts. How the experience of a story rings true with past stories they know to be true in their lives. Stories with fidelity may influence their beliefs and values.

Fisher set five criteria that affect a story's narrative fidelity. The first of the requirements are the values which are embedded in the story. The second of the elements is the connection between the story and the espoused value. The third of the criteria is the possible outcomes that would accrue to people adhering to the espoused values. The last two are firstly the consistency of the narrative's values with the observer's values and lastly the extent to which the story's values represent the highest values possible in human experience.

== Evaluation of reasoning systems ==
Fisher's narrative paradigm offers an alternative to Aristotelian analysis, which dominates the field of rhetorical thinking. Narratives do not require training or expertise to evaluate. Common sense assesses narrative coherence and fidelity. Busselle and Bilandzic distinguish narrative rationality from realism, writing "It is remarkable that the power of narrative is not diminished by readers' or viewers' knowledge that the story is invented. On the contrary, successful stories—those that engage us most—often are both fictional and unrealistic."

Alternatively, Foucault claimed that communications systems formed through the savoir and pouvoir (knowledge and power) of the hierarchies that control access to the discourses. Hence, criteria for assessing the reliability and completeness of evidence, and whether the pattern of reasoning is sound are not absolutes but defined over time by those in positions of authority. This is particularly significant when the process of thinking includes values and policy in addition to empirical data.

The narrative paradigm instead asserts that any individual can judge a story's merits as a basis for belief and action.

Narration affects every aspect of each individual's life in verbal and nonverbal bids for someone to believe or act in a certain way. Even when a message appears abstract—i.e., the language is literal and not figurative—it is narration. This is because it is embedded in the storyteller's ongoing story and it invites observers to assess its value for their own lives.

Narrative rationality and narrative emotion are complementary within a narrative theory. The former considers how effectively the story conveys its meaning, as well as its implications. The latter considers the emotional reactions of the story's observers. Narrative emotion is an emotion felt for the sake of someone, or something, else.

== Applications ==
Narrative theory is an assessment framework within various fields of communication. Those who use narrative theory within their research refer to it as a general way of viewing communication. The narrative paradigm is generally considered an interpretative theory of communication. It is an especially useful theory for teaching qualitative research methods.

Fisher's theory has been considered for domains ranging from organizational communication to family interaction, to racism, and to advertising. McNamara proposed that the narrative paradigm can be used with military storytelling to enhance the perception of the United States armed services. Stutts and Barker, of Virginia Commonwealth University, proposed that the Narrative Paradigm can be used to evaluate if a company's brand will be well received by consumers, by determining if the created narrative has coherence and fidelity. Other researchers proposed using the narrative paradigm to evaluate ethical standards in advertising. Roberts used the narrative paradigm as a way to better understand the use of narrative in folklore. Hobart proposed using narrative theory as a way to interpret urban legends and other kinds of hoaxes.

A study tested the effects of narrative suggestions on paranormal belief. Recall that Fisher's paradigm posits that a good story is more convincing than a good argument. This was put to the test by examining the combined effects of source credibility, narrative, and message modality based on Fisher's idea of narrative rationality. Participants were presented a fabricated news story about strange noises being heard in a nearby science lab. One set of the narratives included an explanation of natural causes for the noise. Another set were explained using a paranormal verbiage in the explanation. Additionally, the main character of the story was either presented as a child witness, a university student, or a scientist with the hypothesis that a possible disparagement in credibility could be a factor. This variation was subsequently utilized to determine if source credibility would affect the narrative suggestion. The study found that the belief in the paranormal narrative was positively correlated when narrative coherence and narrative fidelity (narrative rationality) were strong, regardless of message modality. It was also determined that source credibility had a statistically significant impact on the outcome of belief in the paranormal narrative.

Narrative paradigm is also applicable when assessing multinational working relationships. Global interactions between groups with different backgrounds have the tendency to hinder group progress and building relationships. Over the past two decades, scholars conceptualize diversity in the workplace using several different theories. As companies continue to diversify, businesses look for communication models to help manage the complex structure of human relationships. Narrative paradigm serves as a communication technique that shows companies how the application of a good story could provide benefits in the workforce. Storytelling is a cross-cultural solution that establishes credibility and trust in relationships between workers.

=== Narrative and politics ===
Smith in 1984 conducted one example of a study that used narrative theory more directly. Smith looked at the fidelity and coherence of narratives presented as Republican and Democratic Party platforms in the United States and found that despite apparent differences, each party was able to maintain integrity and fidelity by remaining consistent in both structure and overarching party values.

=== Narrative and health communication ===
A study claimed that narrative features could be strategically altered by health communicators to affect the reader's identification. It found that similarities between the reader and the narrative's protagonist, but not the narrator's point of view, has a direct impact on the narrative's persuasiveness.

=== Narrative and branding ===
Narrative processing can create or enhance connections between a brand and an audience. Companies and business use stories or brands that suggest a story to produce brand loyalty. Businesses invest heavily in creating a good story through advertising and public relations. In brand development, many marketers focus on defining a brand persona (typical user) before constructing a narrative for that brand. Character traits such as honesty, curiosity, flexibility and determination become embedded in the persona. Commitment to the associated behavioral implications can help the brand maintain consistency with its narrative.

=== Narrative and law ===
A growing number of legal scholars contend that narrative persuades in law. In one study, judges tended to prefer legal briefs taking a storytelling approach to those that do not. In response, legal scholars have applied narrative techniques to legal persuasion and even legal communication. Scholars in this area commonly refer to this application as "Applied Legal Storytelling." Legal storytelling in courtrooms requires a formalization of the narratives presented. This is achieved through the use of first- and third-party perspectives of a narrative to mitigate impartial reporting of the story.

== Criticism ==
Critics of the narrative paradigm mainly contend that it is not as universally applicable as Fisher suggests. For example, Rowland asserted that it should be applied strictly to communication that fits classic narrative patterns to avoid undermining its credibility.

Other critiques include issues of conservative bias. Kirkwood stated that Fisher's logic of good reasons focuses only on prevailing issues but does not see all the ways that stories can promote social change. In some ways, both Kirkwood and Fisher agree that this observation is more of an extension to the theory than a critique.

Stroud considered "multivalent" narratives that include seemingly contradictory values or positions that force a reader to reconstruct their meaning, thereby enabling positive judgments of narrative fidelity and the adoption of new values.

Some forms of communication are not narrative in the way that Fisher maintains. Many science fiction and fantasy novels/movies challenge rather than conform to common values.

The narrative approach does not provide a more democratic structure compared to the one imposed by the rational world paradigm. Nor does it offer a complete alternative to that paradigm. The narrative paradigm gained attention from poststructuralist education theorists for appealing to notions of truth.

== Related theories ==
=== Rhetoric theory ===
The narrative paradigm incorporates both the pathos and logos form of rhetoric theory. Rhetoric theory was formulated by Aristotle. He defines rhetoric as: the available means of persuasion. It includes two assumptions. Firstly that effective public speakers must consider their audience. Secondly that effective public speakers supply proofs.

Aristotle divided public speaking into three parts: the speaker, the subject and the audience. He considered the audience the most important, determining the speech's end and object. Therefore, audience analysis, which is the process of evaluating an audience and its background is essential.

In the second assumption, Aristotle's proof refers to the means of persuasion. And these three proof types are Ethos, Pathos, and Logos.

- Ethos: The perceived character, intelligence and goodwill of a speaker as they become revealed through his or her speech.
- Logos: The logic proof that speakers employ.
- Pathos: The emotions that are drawn out of listeners.

There are three modes of ethos

- Phronesis: practical wisdom
- Arete: moral character
- Eunoia: goodwill

=== Situation models ===
When people experience a story, the comprehension phase is where they form a mental representation of the text. Such a mental image is called a situation model. Situation models are representations of the state of affairs described in a document rather than of the text itself. Much of the research suggests that observers behave as though they are in the story rather than outside of it. This supports Fisher's model that narrative components backed by good reasons are related to elements in situation models.

==== Space ====
Situation models represent relevant aspects of the narrative's environment. Objects that are spatially close to observers are generally more relevant than more distant objects. The same holds for situation models. Observers are similarly slower to recognize words denoting objects distant from a protagonist than those close to the protagonist. When observers have extensive knowledge of the spatial layout of the story setting (e.g., a building), they update their representations according to the location and goals of the protagonist. They have the fastest mental access to the room that the protagonist is close to. For example, they can more readily say whether two objects are in the same room if the room mentioned is close to the protagonist. The interpretation of the meaning of a verb denoting the movement of people or objects in space, such as to approach, depends on their situation models. The interpretation of observers also depends on the size of the landmark and the speed of the figure. Observers behave as if they are actually present in the situation.

==== Goals and causation ====
In one study observers recognized goals yet to be accomplished by the protagonist more quickly than goals that had just been accomplished. When Keefe and McDaniel presented subjects with sentences such as "after standing through a 3-hour debate, the tired speaker walked over to his chair (and sat down)" and then with probe words (e.g., "sat"). Subjects took about the same amount of time to name sat when the clause about the speaker sitting down was omitted and when it was included. Moreover, naming times were significantly faster in both of these conditions than in a control condition, in which it was implied that the speaker remained standing.

== Sources ==
- Anderson, Rob & Ross, Veronica. (2001). Questions of Communication: A Practical Introduction to Theory (3rd ed.). New York: Bedford/St. Martin's Press. ISBN 0-312-25080-0
- Barker, R. T.; Gower, K. (2009). "Use of Uncertainty Reduction and Narrative Paradigm Theories in Management Consulting and Teaching: Lessons Learned". Business Communication Quarterly. 72 (3): 338–341. doi:10.1177/1080569909340627. S2CID 168122062.
- Berlanga, I.; García-García, F.; Victoria, J. S. (2013). "Ethos, pathos and logos in Facebook. User networking: New "rhetor" of the 21st century". Comunicar. 21 (41): 127–35. doi:10.3916/c41-2013-12. hdl:10272/7031.
- Cragan, John F., & Shields, Donald C. (1997). Understanding Communication Theory: The Communicative Forces for Human Action. Boston, MA: Allyn & Bacon. ISBN 0-205-19587-3
- Fisher, Walter R (1984). "Narration as Human Communication Paradigm: The Case of Public Moral Argument". Communication Monographs. 51: 1–22. doi:10.1080/03637758409390180.
- Fisher, Walter R (1985). "The Narrative Paradigm: In the Beginning". Journal of Communication. 35 (4): 74–89. doi:10.1111/j.1460-2466.1985.tb02974.x.
- Fisher, Walter R (1988). "The Narrative Paradigm and the Assessment of Historical Texts". Argumentation and Advocacy. 25 (2): 49–53. doi:10.1080/00028533.1988.11951383.
- Fisher, Walter R (1989). "Clarifying the Narrative Paradigm". Communication Monographs. 56: 55–58. doi:10.1080/03637758909390249.
- Fisher, Walter R (1994). "Narrative Rationality and the Logic of Scientific Discourse". Argumentation. 8: 21–32. doi:10.1007/bf00710701. S2CID 144080224.
- Fisher, Walter R. (1995). "Narration, Knowledge, and the Possibility of Wisdom" in Rethinking Knowledge: Reflections Across the Disciplines (Suny Series in the Philosophy of the Social Sciences). (Fisher & Robert F. Goodman as editors). New York: State University of New York Press.
- Francis, Kimberly (2015). "Her - Storiography: Pierre Bourdieu, Cultural Capital, and Changing the Narrative Paradigm". Women & Music. 19 (169–177): 210. doi:10.1353/wam.2015.0010. S2CID 143333501.
- Glenberg, Arthur M; Meyer, Marion; Lindem, Karen (February 1987). "Mental models contribute to foregrounding during text comprehension". Journal of Memory and Language. 26 (1): 69–83. doi:10.1016/0749-596X(87)90063-5.
- Griffin, Em (2009). A First Look at Communication Theory. McGraw-Hill Higher Education. ISBN 978-0-07-127053-3.
- Jameson, Daphne A. (2001-10-01). "Narrative Discourse and Management Action". Journal of Business Communication. 38 (4): 476–511. doi:10.1177/002194360103800404. S2CID 145215100.
- Kahneman, Daniel, Paul Slovic, and Amos Tversky, eds. Judgment under uncertainty: Heuristics and biases. New York: Cambridge University Press, 1982.
- Rowland, Robert C. (March 1989). "On limiting the narrative paradigm: Three case studies". Communication Monographs. 56 (1): 39–54. doi:10.1080/03637758909390248.
- Theye, Kirsten (24 April 2008). "Shoot, I'm Sorry: An Examination of Narrative Functions and Effectiveness within Dick Cheney's Hunting Accident Apologia". Southern Communication Journal. 73 (2): 160–177. doi:10.1080/10417940802009566. S2CID 144037258.
- Warnick, Barbara (May 1987). "The narrative paradigm: Another story". Quarterly Journal of Speech. 73 (2): 172–182. doi:10.1080/00335638709383801.
