= Andorno (surname) =

Andorno is a surname. Notable people with the surname include:

- Nikola Biller-Andorno, a German bioethicist
- Roberto Andorno, Associate Professor at the Faculty of Law, University of Zurich, Switzerland
- Jimmy Natale, a Marvel Comics supervillain known as the Vulture

== See also ==
- Andorno (disambiguation)
- Adorno (surname)
