= Andorno =

Andorno may refer to:

- Andorno Micca, a municipality in the Province of Biella in the Italian region Piedmont,
- Andorno Station, a historic stagecoach station and hotel site near Winnemucca, Nevada
- Andorno (surname), surname
