= David Kleinberg-Levin =

American philosopher

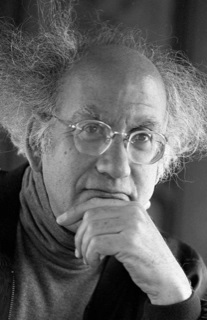
- Born: April 6, 1939 (age 87)

Education
- Education: Phillips Academy, Andover, Massachusetts (Honours, 1958); Harvard University (BA, Honours, 1961); Columbia University (Ph.D., 1967)

Philosophical work
- Era: 21st-century philosophy
- Region: Western philosophy
- Institutions: Northwestern University
- Main interests: hermeneutical phenomenology, critical social theory, philosophical essays on the arts

David Kleinberg-Levin (born 6 April 1939) is an American philosopher and Emeritus Professor of Philosophy at Northwestern University. He is known for his works on 19th and 20th century continental European philosophy. His primary focus, influenced in part by Friedrich Schiller, is the formation of an approach to morality and ethical life with an emphasis on perception and sensibility. In 2005, he retired as Professor Emeritus from Northwestern University.

== Philosophy ==
Kleinberg-Levin’s lifetime project in philosophy, which he has called “The Body of Ontological Understanding,” draws on a hermeneutical phenomenology (especially the work of Heidegger, Merleau-Ponty) in order to illuminate, in the light of critical social theory (especially the thought of Benjamin, Adorno, Habermas), the stages in a process of self-development embodying in the maturity of seeing, hearing, movement and gesturing, a sensibility and understanding (phronesis) conducive to participating in the flourishing of ethical life and contributing to its empathic openness to the Other. Recently, he has also made caring for the natural environment a theme for his research and thought, arguing that, in the acquisition of language, the infant is solicited and induced by the sounds of nature and the social environment to replicate these sounds in forming speech. And this indebtedness or beholdenness to nature in the learning of language, he argues, constitutes a reciprocating moral responsibility for the natural environment, as well as a strong reciprocal moral responsibility to serve the community and its culture.

== Books ==
- Reason And Evidence In Husserl's Phenomenology (NUP 1970)
- The Body's Recollection Of Being (Routledge 1985)
- The Opening Of Vision (Routledge 1988)
- The Listening Self (Routledge 1989)
- The Philosopher's Gaze: Modernity In The Shadows Of Enlightenment (The University of California Press 1999)
- Gestures of Ethical Life: Holderlin's Question of Measure After Heidegger (Stanford University Press, 2005)
- Before the Voice of Reason: Echoes of Responsibility in Merleau-Ponty's Ecology and Levinas's Ethics (SUNY Press, 2008)
- Redeeming Words and the Promise of Happiness: A Critical Theory Approach to Wallace Stevens and Vladimir Nabokov (Lexington Books, 2012)
- Redeeming Words: Language and the Promise of Happiness in the Stories of Döblin and Sebald (SUNY Press, 2013)
- Beckett's Words: The Promise of Happiness in a Time of Mourning (Bloomsbury Press, 2015)
- Heidegger’s Phenomenology of Perception: Introduction, vol. I (Rowman & Littlefield, Inc., 2019)
- Heidegger’s Phenomenology of Perception: Learning to See, Learning to Hear, vol. II (Rowman & Littlefield, Inc., 2020)
- Critical Studies on Heidegger: The Emerging Body of Understanding (State University of New York Press, 2023)

=== Edited ===
- Pathologies Of The Modern Self (NYU 1988)
- Modernity And The Hegemony Of Vision (University of California 1994)
- Sites Of Vision (MIT Press 1997)
- Language Beyond Postmodernism (NUP 1997)
