= Metanoia =

Metanoia, an Ancient Greek word (μετάνοια) meaning "changing one's mind", may refer to:

- Metanoia (psychology), a process of fundamental psychological transformation, often precipitated by crisis, breakdown, or existential conflict
- Metanoia (rhetoric), a device used to retract a statement just made, and then state it in a better way
- Metanoia (theology), often translated as "conversion" or "repentance"

== Music ==
- Metanoia (Australian band), a Christian death metal band
- Metanoia (Chilean band), a Christian hardcore band
- Metanoia (For All Eternity album), 2015
- Metanoia (IAMX album), 2015
- Metanoia (Porcupine Tree album), 1998
- Metanoia (Yōsei Teikoku album), 2007
- Metanoia (Persefone album), 2022
- Metanoia, an album by Fear of Domination, 2018
- Metanoia, Pt.1, an album by Druha Rika, 2012
- "Metanoia" (song), by MGMT, 2008
- "Metanoia", a song by Gerry Rafferty from Another World, 2000
- "Metanoia", a song by the Human Abstract from Midheaven, 2008
- "Metanoia", a song by King Missile from Happy Hour, 1992
- "Metanoia", a song by Nana Mizuki, 2019
- "Metanoia", a song by Varials from Where the Light Leaves, 2026

== Other uses ==
- Metanoia Films, a Mexican-American film production company
- Metanoia, a direct climbing route opened in 1991 by Jeff Lowe on the Eiger's north face
- Metanoia, a fictional video game in the film RPG Metanoia
- Metanoia: A Speculative Ontology of Language, Thinking, and the Brain, a 2014 book by Armen Avanessian and Anke Hennig
