= Rhetorical reason =

Faculty of discovering the crux of the matter

Rhetorical reason is the faculty of discovering the crux of the matter. It is a characteristic of rhetorical invention (inventio) and it precedes argumentation.

== Aristotle's definition ==
Aristotle's definition of rhetoric, "the faculty of observing, in any given case, the available means of persuasion", presupposes a distinction between an art (τέχνη, techne) of speech–making and a cognitively prior faculty of discovery. That is so because, before one argues a case, one must discover what is at issue. How, for example, does one discover available means of persuasion? One does not simply frolic through fertile fields of τόποι (topoi), randomly gathering materials with which to build lines of argument. There is a method endemic to rhetoric which guides the search for those lines of argument that speak most directly to the issue at stake.

George A. Kennedy explains the distinction when he writes that the work of rhetoric, in Aristotle's view, is

to discover [θεωρησαι (theoresai)] the available means of persuasion" (1.1.1355b25–6). It is thus a theoretical activity and discovers knowledge. This knowledge, which includes words, arguments, and topics, is then used by the orator as the material cause of a speech. There is thus a theoretical art of rhetoric standing behind or above the productive art of speech-making. (1980, p. 63)

Inventio (rhetorical invention) then, involves more than a techne; it is also a faculty of discovery (dunamis (δύναμις) to theoresai).

The Aristotelian approach to inventio further assumes that reasoning employed in decision-making is a kind of probable reasoning.

It assumes that, although the contingencies of nature and of individuals prevent our obtaining certainty about future political and social affairs, we still can use our reason to discover the best course to pursue. Such reasoning applied to human affairs to make decisions about what should be done is rhetorical reasoning issuing in praxis. (Moss 1986, pp. 2, 3)

== Moral inquiry ==
Judgments about what should be done in the future are generally matters of shared inquiry and are always contingent (based on probability). Shared inquiry, following Wayne C. Booth, can be understood as "the art of reasoning together about shared concerns" (1988, p. 108). It is shared because the judgment is discursively negotiated with reference to both the crux of the matter and in light of what is in the best interest of oneself or some other.

Accounting for both Moss and Booth, rhetorical reason may be conceptualized as a method of "shared moral inquiry", but with a special meaning of the word "moral". Moral inquiry, within the present context, means inquiry into practical matters (as opposed to mere speculation or scientific inquiry). Hans-Georg Gadamer uses "moral" in this sense in Truth and Method (p. 314). Albert R. Jonsen and Stephen Toulmin write that "moral knowledge is essentially particular" (1988, p. 330). Shared moral inquiry is moral, not because it involves questions of morality, but because it attempts to determine what is the right thing to do in contingent cases, where such judgments are not made deterministically. Moral inquiry is conducted in the contingent realm, and is concerned with the particular case.

Understood with precision then, rhetorical reason guides and φρόνησις (phronesis) drives moral inquiry. The aim of moral inquiry is sound moral judgment, but judgment in hard cases is frustrated because the crux of the matter is hedged in by a potentially limitless parade of particulars.

Rhetorical reason manages particulars by systematically determining the relevance of issues and identifying the στάσις (stasis, which is the most relevant of the relevant issues). Ascribing relevance is an act of phronesis (Tallmon, 2001 & 1995a, b). Hence, rhetorical reason is a modality of phronesis and also, as Aristotle famously notes, a counterpart of dialectic. That is, it depends upon practical wisdom for its proper work, and, in that work, it operates much like dialectical inference, only its proper domain is the particular case as opposed to the general question.

Hence, viewed as a guide to resolving tough cases, rhetorical reason is constituted by:

- topical logic (which guides inquiry by managing particulars)
- stasis (which guides inquiry toward the crux of the matter)
- sensitivity to maxims (which signal when the inquiry has taken a turn away from the instant case)
- dialectical inference (which helps clarify the issue at stake), and the entire enterprise is driven by
- phronesis

Individuals exercise rhetorical reason, but its excellence is realized in the public arena (i.e., in shared inquiry, by referencing pooled wisdom).

== See also ==
- Casuistry
- Chaïm Perelman – author of The New Rhetoric
- Inquiry
- Practical reason
- Problem finding
- Rogerian argument
- Socratic method
