= Philipp Kanske =

German psychologist and neuroscientist

Philipp Kanske (* 1980 in Dresden) is a German psychologist and neuroscientist. He is professor at Technische Universität Dresden. His research focuses on the neuronal foundations of emotion, emotion regulation and emotion understanding (empathy, perspective-taking), as well as their changes in mental disorders. Philipp Kanske is speaker of the Junge Akademie.

== Life and career ==
Kanske studied psychology at Technische Universität Dresden and at the University of Oregon with scholarships of Evangelisches Studienwerk Villigst and the Fulbright Commission. He received his doctorate with summa cum laude from Leipzig University in 2008. He then worked as a postdoctoral researcher at the Central Institute of Mental Health in Mannheim and at Heidelberg University, where he did his habilitation in 2014. From 2012 to 2017 he was a group leader at the Max Planck Institute for Human Cognitive and Brain Sciences in Leipzig. Since 2017 he heads the Chair of Clinical Psychology and Behavioral Neuroscience at Technische Universität Dresden. Kanske is a licensed psychotherapist.

== Honors and awards ==
- 2024 – 2028 ERC Consolidator Grant "INTERACT - The interplay of neural networks enabling social interaction" by the European Research Council
- 2017 – Heinz Maier-Leibnitz Award of the German Research Foundation
- 2015 – Member of the Junge Akademie at the German National Academy of Sciences Leopoldina and the Berlin-Brandenburg Academy of Sciences and Humanities
- 2013 – Lilly Young Investigator Fellowship in Bipolar Disorder at the International Conference on Bipolar Disorder
- 2013 – Young Investigator Award of the European Brain and Behaviour Society
- 2013 – „Rising Star” of the Association for Psychological Science
- 2012 – Young Investigator Award of the German Society for Psychophysiology and its Application
- 2008 – Otto Hahn Medal of the Max Planck Society

== Publications ==
For a complete list of publications, see Kanske's Google Scholar Profile.

- Kanske, P., Heissler, J., Schönfelder, S., Bongers, A., & Wessa, M. (2010). How to regulate emotion? Neural networks for reappraisal and distraction. Cerebral Cortex, 21(6), 1379–1388. doi:10.1093/cercor/bhq216
- Kanske, P., Heissler, J., Schönfelder, S., & Wessa, M. (2012). Neural correlates of emotion regulation deficits in remitted depression: the influence of regulation strategy, habitual regulation use, and emotional valence. Neuroimage, 61(3), 686–693. doi:10.1016/j.neuroimage.2012.03.089
- Kanske, P., Schönfelder, S., Forneck, J., & Wessa, M. (2015). Impaired regulation of emotion: neural correlates of reappraisal and distraction in bipolar disorder and unaffected relatives. Translational psychiatry, 5(1), e497. doi:10.1038/tp.2014.137
- Kanske, P., Böckler, A., Trautwein, F. M., & Singer, T. (2015). Dissecting the social brain: Introducing the EmpaToM to reveal distinct neural networks and brain–behavior relations for empathy and Theory of Mind. Neuroimage, 122, 6–19. doi:10.1016/j.neuroimage.2015.07.082
- Kanske, P., Böckler, A., Trautwein, F. M., Parianen Lesemann, F. H., & Singer, T. (2016). Are strong empathizers better mentalizers? Evidence for independence and interaction between the routes of social cognition. Social cognitive and affective neuroscience, 11(9), 1383–1392. doi:10.1093/scan/nsw052
- Kanske, P. (2018). The social mind: disentangling affective and cognitive routes to understanding others. Interdisciplinary Science Reviews, 43(2), 115–124. doi:10.1080/03080188.2018.1453243
