= Chaïm Perelman =

Belgian philosopher (1912–1984)

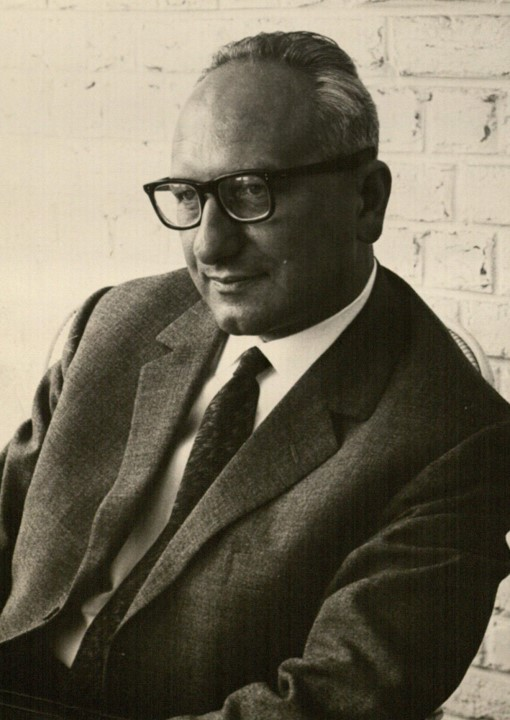
- Portrait of Polish-born philosopher Chaïm Perelman
- Born: Henio Perelman; 20 May 1912; Warsaw, Warsaw Governorate, Kingdom of Poland, Russian Empire
- Died: 22 January 1984 (aged 71); Brussels, Belgium
- Other name: (mistaken) Charles Perelman

Education
- Education: Free University of Brussels

Philosophical work
- Institutions: Université Libre de Bruxelles; Pennsylvania State University
- Notable works: Traité de l'argumentation – la nouvelle rhétorique (1958), with Lucie Olbrechts-Tyteca

Chaïm Perelman (born Henio (or Henri) Perelman; sometimes referred to mistakenly as Charles Perelman) (20 May 1912 – 22 January 1984) was a Belgian philosopher of Polish-Jewish origin. He was among the most important argumentation theorists of the 20th century. His chief work is the Traité de l'argumentation – la nouvelle rhétorique (1958), with Lucie Olbrechts-Tyteca, translated into English as The New Rhetoric: A Treatise on Argumentation, by John Wilkinson and Purcell Weaver (1969).

== Life and work ==
Perelman and his family emigrated from Warsaw to Antwerp, Belgium, in 1925. He began his undergraduate studies at the Université Libre de Bruxelles, where he would remain for the duration of his career. He earned a doctorate in law in 1934, and after completing a dissertation on the philosopher and mathematician Gottlob Frege, earned a second doctorate in 1938. In the same year, Perelman was appointed lecturer at Brussels in the Faculty of Philosophy and Letters. By the end of the war, he became the youngest full professor in the history of that university.

Perelman's friend Mieczysław Maneli wrote: "Perelman was a Belgian, a Jew, a Pole and an authentic cosmopolitan... If one prefers to call Perelman a Polish Jew, then only in the sense suggested by Czeslaw Milosz ... [he belonged to] a special category of Jewish-European intellectual, different from all the other Jewish and non-Jewish intellectuals.... Perelman was uniquely able to combine his nationality and his humanity in his writings. He was an ardent Belgian patriot and he preserved close ties with Polish scholars and Polish culture at the same time."

Perelman's initial research in law and philosophy was carried out under the aegis of logical positivism. In 1944, he completed an empiricist study of justice and concluded that since applications of the law always involve value judgments—and since values cannot be subjected to the rigors of logic—the foundations of justice must be arbitrary. Upon completing the study, Perelman considered its conclusion untenable since value judgments form an integral part of all practical reasoning and decision-making, and to claim that these judgments lack any logical basis was to deny the rational foundations of philosophy, law, politics, and ethics.

As a result of his empiricist study of justice, Perelman rejected positivism in favour of philosophies that provided a rationale for value judgments. In 1948, he met Lucie Olbrechts-Tyteca, who had also attended the Université Libre de Bruxelles, and began collaborating on a project that would eventually establish ancient rhetoric as the foundation for a logic of value judgments.

In 1958, Perelman and Olbrechts-Tyteca published their study of informal reasoning as Traité de l'argumentation: la nouvelle rhétorique. Undertaken in the spirit of Fregean observation and synthesis, the work analyzed a wide range of actual arguments from the realms of philosophy, law, politics, ethics, and journalism. The result was a theory of argumentation that was grounded in considerations of value and audience and that outlined points of departure and general techniques for argument.

In 1962, Perelman was invited by Henry W. Johnstone and Robert Oliver to take a position at Pennsylvania State University as a distinguished visiting professor. The collaboration between Johnstone and Perelman in particular, which had begun prior to the publication of la nouvelle rhétorique, proved fruitful. Johnstone created the influential journal Philosophy and Rhetoric, and Perelman became established in the United States as a leading argumentation theorist.

Throughout the next two decades, Perelman continued publishing works related to or derived from the new rhetoric. He also made significant contributions to studies in law as director of the National Center for Research in Logic at the Université Libre de Bruxelles, and through continued publications on legal philosophy and argument. In 1973 he was one of the signers of the Humanist Manifesto II. Perelman's friend, Mieczysław Maneli, wrote about his attitude towards Judaism: "He very consciously rejects any theology or earthly or heavenly salvation, any monism of values, any absolutistic interpretations of human needs and forms of freedoms. Any form of theology is unacceptable towards him."

In recognition of his academic and civic accomplishments, Perelman was appointed to the baronage by the Belgian legislature in December 1983. In 1962 Chaïm Perelman was awarded the Francqui Prize for Human Sciences. He died at his home in Brussels from a heart attack on 22 January 1984.

== Perelmanian philosophy ==
After completing De la justice (in French), 1944, Perelman rejected the usefulness of logical positivism beyond its applications to pure science. In Philosophies premières et philosophie regressive (in French) published five years later, he further outlined the limits of first philosophies or metaphysics. Because these approaches relied on a series of self-evident and mutually supporting axioms, any perceived error would disable the entire philosophy and its claims to reveal universal and absolute truths. Prevalent alternatives, especially the relativism of Jean-Paul Sartre, were also untenable for Perelman since the absolutes of metaphysics were merely replaced in these approaches by absolute skepticism.

During his research with Olbrechts-Tyteca, Perelman would develop a philosophy that avoided the absolutes of both positivism and radical relativism. After encountering an excerpt of Brunetto Latini in the appendix of Jean Paulhan's Les fleurs de Tarbes (in French), Perelman began researching ancient Greco-Latin approaches to argumentation. He found that while a specific logic of value judgments had never been established, an approach to the problem was apparent in the works of Aristotle. In the Posterior Analytics, Aristotle establishes the principles of demonstration or analytics, which rely on the accepted premises and necessary conclusions of the syllogism. In the Topics and elsewhere, Aristotle opposes the demonstrative approach to dialectics, or rhetorical reasoning, which relies on premises that are acceptable in a given situation and are thus contingent. With Aristotle's distinctions, Perelman was able to perceive the contradiction of first philosophies: while claiming to reveal universal and absolute truths according to demonstrative methods, philosophy was in reality more concerned with persuading specific audiences to accept its claims. For Perelman, then, a viable philosophy—capable of establishing aspects of being and inducing reasonable action—must be constructed according to probabilities and must be able to withstand impositions of value and other contingencies stemming from its reception by particular audiences. Perelman's approach, which he termed regressive philosophy, thus sought to incorporate socially constructed truths and to remain amenable to changes should those truths be modified.

While rhetoric and argumentation provided the core of Perelman's philosophy, his regressive approach also shaped his treatise on non-formal argumentation. In the conclusion of the new rhetoric, Perelman and Olbrechts-Tyteca state that in opposition to the absolutes common in philosophy, their project acknowledges that "men and groups of men adhere to opinions of all sorts with a variable intensity" and that "these beliefs are not always self-evident, and they rarely deal with clear and distinct ideas". To uncover the logic that governs these beliefs and ideas, Perelman and Olbrechts-Tyteca rely on a regressive philosophy that accounts for the variability of particular situations and particular values. Perelman would employ this same approach in future developments of the new rhetoric and in subsequent writings on law and justice.

== The new rhetoric ==
=== Overview ===
Perelman and Olbrechts-Tyteca began research on the logic of non-formal arguments in 1948. Following Frege's comprehensive approach to the study of mathematics, they collected a wide range of writing from academic, professional, religious, and popular realms to devise and apply their theory. After encountering Latini and "rediscovering" the Greco-Latin rhetorical tradition, both the project and its philosophical basis took a definitive shape. Perelman hypothesized that the rationale governing non-formal argument could be derived from the principles of rhetorical theory and from considerations of audience and values in particular. These considerations in turn affected the specific structure of arguments, including the bases of agreement and the availability of specific appeals. Perelman's analysis also produced an overview of the various techniques apparent across the diverse group of arguments collected in the course of research.

The following discussion of the new rhetoric is organized according to the three sections of the book, and covers the major concepts contained in each.

=== The framework of argumentation ===
The new rhetoric is founded on the idea that "since argumentation aims at securing the adherence of those to whom it is addressed, it is, in its entirety, relative to the audience to be influenced" (1969, p. 19). Perelman and Olbrechts-Tyteca rely in particular for their theory of argumentation on the twin concepts of universal and particular audiences: while every argument is directed to a specific individual or group, the orator decides what information and what approaches will achieve the greatest adherence according to an ideal audience. This ideal, Perelman explains, can be embodied, for example, "in God, in all reasonable and competent men, in the man deliberating or in an elite" (2001, p. 1393). Like particular audiences, then, the universal audience is never fixed or absolute but depends on the orator, the content and goals of the argument, and the particular audience to whom the argument is addressed. These considerations determine what information constitutes "facts" and "reasonableness" and thus help to determine the universal audience that, in turn, shapes the orator's approach.

The adherence of an audience is also determined by the orator's use of values, a further key concept of the new rhetoric. Perelman's treatment of value and his view of epideictic rhetoric sets his approach apart from that of the ancients and of Aristotle in particular. Aristotle's division of rhetoric into three genres—forensic, deliberative, and epideictic—is largely motivated by the judgments required for each: forensic or legal arguments require verdicts on past action, deliberative or political rhetoric seeks judgment on future action, and epideictic or ceremonial rhetoric concerns values associated with praise or blame and seeks no specific decisions. For Aristotle, the epideictic genre was of limited importance in the civic realm since it did not concern facts or policies. Perelman, in contrast, believes not only that epideictic rhetoric warrants more attention, but that the values normally limited to that genre are in fact central to all argumentation. "Epideictic oratory", Perelman argues, "has significance and importance for argumentation because it strengthens the disposition toward action by increasing adherence to the values it lauds" (1969, p. 50). These values, moreover, are central to the persuasiveness of arguments in all rhetorical genres since the orator always attempts to "establish a sense of communion centered around particular values recognized by the audience" (1969, p. 51).

=== The starting points of argumentation ===
All argumentation, according to Perelman and Olbrechts-Tyteca, must proceed from a point of agreement; contentious matters in particular cannot be introduced until sufficient agreement on prior or related issues has already been established. The bases of agreement are divided into two categories: the first deals with facts, truths, and presumptions; the second with values, hierarchies, and loci of the preferable.

Both facts and truths are normally established prior to argument; these are aspects of reality that would be agreed to, for instance, by the universal audience as conceived by the orator. Neither facts nor truths provide opportunity for dispute; as Perelman explains, "if we presuppose the coherence of reality and of our truths taken as a whole, there cannot be any conflict between facts and truths on which we would be called to make a decision" (2001, p. 1394). Presumptions, like facts and truths, need not be defended. Should the argument require opposing presumptions, however, the orator may overturn previous opinion by proving an opposite case.

Values, both concrete and abstract, may also constitute starting points, although none should be treated as universal. Establishing and reinforcing common values is necessary, according to Perelman, because they influence action and determine acceptable behaviour (2001, p. 1394). Values, moreover, are normally arranged in hierarchies that can also serve as starting points for argument. An audience will value both justice and utility, for example, but an argument may require a determination of preference between the two. Like values, hierarchies can be abstract or concrete; they may also be homogeneous, in the case of degrees, or heterogeneous, in the example of honesty and truthfulness. Both values and hierarchies can be justified by the final point of agreement, which Perelman and Olbrechts-Tyteca term loci of the preferable. These loci or commonplaces are derived from the third book of Aristotle's Topics, and allow agreement according to the determination of which, between two loci, is more preferred. Thus, an argument may begin from the determination that an intrinsic quality, such as health, is preferred over a contingent quality, such as beauty.

The final aspect of argument starting points discussed in the new rhetoric is the creation of "presence". From the body of ideas that are agreed upon by a given audience, the orator may choose to emphasize or lend presence to certain elements while deemphasizing others. As Perelman explains, "things present, things near to us in space and time, act directly on our sensibility", yet if things distant—from the past or future—are more relevant to the argument, they may be lent presence through specific rhetorical figures, such as hypotyposis or anaphora (2001, p. 1395). All points of agreement, moreover, may be distinguished as primary or secondary according to the purpose of the argument and the composition of the particular audience. This is accomplished, Perelman notes, by linguistic categories that allow the orator to mount arguments "under the guise of a descriptive narrative" (ibid).

=== Argument techniques ===
Because non-formal argument is concerned with the adherence of an audience—rather than the mere demonstration of propositions proper to formal logic—the orator must ensure that the audience adheres to each successive element of an argument. Perelman outlines two ways the orator may achieve this acceptance or adherence: the first involves associations according to quasi-logical arguments, appeals to reality, and arguments that establish the real; the second approach responds to incompatible opinions through the dissociation of concepts.

Quasi-logical arguments, Perelman explains, are "similar to the formal structures of logic and mathematics" (2001, p. 1396). Definition is a common quasi-logical approach that is used not only for establishing the meaning of a term but also for emphasizing certain features of an object for persuasive purposes. Other quasi-logical arguments include relations of division, arguments of reciprocity, and arguments of probability. While these techniques appear to share the qualities of formal demonstrations, Perelman notes that for all quasi-logical approaches, "complementary, nonformal hypotheses are necessary to render the argument compelling" (2001, p. 1398).

The remaining associative techniques involve appealing to reality and establishing the real. Arguments of the former category can be further divided into those conveying succession and those dealing with coexistence. Relations of succession include causes and effects, such as the consequences of a particular action, or means and ends, such as the projected outcome of an event or process. Relations of coexistence, on the other hand, associate a person or essence to a specific act, and include arguments from authority. Like appeals to the real, arguments that establish the structure of reality can be divided into two categories: arguments from example or model, and arguments by analogy. The former rely on generalizations derived from a single situation, in the case of example, or on the conformation of a single situation to an accepted practice or ethos, in the case of models. Appeals to the real that rely on analogy are common and, according to Perelman, are "typical to Plato, Plotinus, and all those who establish hierarchies within reality" (2001, p. 1399). These appeals establish the relation between two terms by noting their similarity to another, more familiar set of terms; for example, "truth is to Socrates what gold is to a miser". Metaphor, another common aspect of argumentation, is a form of condensed analogy.

When orators seek to reconcile incompatible opinions, they may gain adherence by a dissociation of concepts. The final technique discussed by Perelman and Olbrechts-Tyteca is a common approach in metaphysics that opposes appearances to reality. As Perelman explains, reality is normally perceived "through appearances that are taken as signs referring to it. When, however, appearances are incompatible – an oar in water looks broken but feels straight to the touch – we must admit...that some appearances are illusory and may lead us to error regarding the real" (2001, p. 1400). This recognition in turn fosters a conception of reality by which appearances may be judged; those aspects conforming to the real are considered valuable, while those not consistent with reality are dismissed as illusive. The dissociation of ideas can be extended to any realm where the tenets of an argument are incompatible with accepted opinion; "real democracy", for instance, can be opposed to "apparent democracy, or formal or nominal democracy, or quasi-democracy" (ibid.). In the process of this opposition, adherence to "real democracy" is achieved not on the basis of its merit as an idea, but rather through the devaluation of opposing terms.

== Responses to Perelman and the new rhetoric ==
The most common criticisms of the new rhetoric focus on Perelman's concept of a universal audience. Prominent criticisms by Jürgen Habermas, Henry Johnstone Jr., and John Ray challenge the practicality and applicability of Perelman's concept. In response, Perelman and Crosswhite both offer support for the concept of the universal audience. The work has been translated, in whole or in part, into nine languages and has been described variously as "groundbreaking", by J. Robert Cox, a "bombshell", by Michael Leff, and as "one of the most influential modern formulations of rhetorical theory", by Brian Vickers. The new rhetoric and its later developments have been foundational for argumentation theory in the last thirty years, and Perelman's work has influenced studies ranging from justice and reason to social psychology and political geography.

Crosswhite discusses Jürgen Habermas's theory of truth in relation to the concept of a universal audience. However, when he tries to distinguish between rational consensus and de facto consensus (or truth from agreement), there is limited relevance to the "ideal speech situation". Because the universal audience requires there to be equality for all speakers, ideas, and audience members, it is not a realistic representation of a situation that would ever occur and thus the idea of a universal audience is not practical.

Perelman's theory of a universal audience includes reasonable people of all time, thus removing the argument or speech out of the context of history. Perelman's theory requires the speaker to understand universal values and ideals throughout history. Henry Johnstone Jr., argues the philosophical and cultural changes over time are sometimes so great, that arguments cannot be universally effective and understood. Simply due to the differences in circumstance, it is impossible for a universal audience to exist. People of a certain time and place, the particular audience, are the limits of persuasive capacities.

John Ray critiques the concept of a universal audience as irrelevant because it lacks structure and content. Ray claims a universal audience is disorganized because it is different for each speaker based on his or her purpose. While the construction of a universal audience does require setting aside "all the particular, local features of the audience and consider only those features of the audience one considers universal", the concept of a universal audience will vary based on the motives, goals, and experiences of the speaker. When abiding by the universal audience, it is difficult to construct a persuasive argument, as the speaker must use general and vague language to be cognizant of all the audience-members' values and ideals. Ray is concerned that when forced to follow such constraints, the speaker will not only fail to be persuasive, but will also fail to remain valid in specific situations.

James Crosswhite addresses concerns about the validity of universal claims in formal argument. One way to construct this universal audience is to discover its universal character. The speaker must set aside any conflicting ideas or values, but because this process of creating a universal audience is specific to the circumstances, it can yield different and conflicting ideals as universal. Perelman makes the distinction that when creating a universal audience you should only eliminate conflicting concepts and values that are relevant. Additionally, because the idea of a universal audience itself is empirical, the speaker forms the imagined universal audience based on past experiences and pre-existing notions of how the universal audience should be defined.

While the concept of the universal audience has been criticized for trying to create complete agreement, Perelman claims its main purpose is to steer the speakers towards reasonableness. And in regards to the validity of arguments formed around the universal audience, the creation of a universal audience is a tool and constraint for the speaker. It is meant to be a moral standard when addressing any audience, but will still allow for persuasion and specificity.

== Influence ==
The German philosopher Hans-Georg Gadamer cites Perelman's work on rhetoric as an influence on the hermeneutical philosophy he presented in Truth and Method, his masterpiece.

== Personal life ==
Perelman married Fela Liver in 1935, and they had a daughter, Noémi, in 1936. The Perelmans were leaders of the Jewish resistance in Brussels as co-founders of the Comité de Défense des Juifs, and Noémi was a hidden child who later in life became a psychologist.

== See also ==
- New rhetoric movement

== Bibliography ==
Selected French bibliography

Articles

- (1948). Le problème du bon choix. Revue de l’Institut de Sociologie, 3, 383–98.
- (1949). Philosophies premières et philosophie régressive. Dialectica, 3, 175–91.

Books

- (1963). Justice et raison. Bruxelles: Presses Universitaires de Bruxelles.
- (1968). Droit, morale et philosophie. Paris: Librairie Générale de Droit et de Jurisprudence.
- (1969). Le Champ de l'argumentation. Bruxelles: Presses Universitaires de Bruxelles.
- (1976). Logique juridique. Paris: Dalloz.
- (1977). L'Empire rhétorique. Paris: Vrin.
- (1984). Le Raisonnable et le déraisonnable en droit. Paris: Librairie Générale de Droit et de Jurisprudence.

With Lucie Olbrechts-Tyteca

- (1950). Logique et rhétorique. Revue philosophique, 140, 1-35.
- (1952). Rhétorique et philosophie: Pour une théorie de l'argumentation en philosophie. Paris: Presses Universitaires de France
- (1958). Traité de l'argumentation: La nouvelle rhétorique. Paris: Presses Universitaires de France

Selected English bibliography

Articles

- (1955). How do we apply reason to values? Journal of Philosophy, 52, 797–802.
- (1968). Rhetoric and philosophy. Philosophy and Rhetoric, 1, 15–24.
- (1984). The new rhetoric and the rhetoricians: Remembrances and comments. The Quarterly Journal of Speech, 70(2), 188–96.
- (2003). First philosophies and regressive philosophy. Philosophy and Rhetoric, 36(3), 189–206.

Books

- (1963). The idea of justice and the problem of argument. (J. Petrie, Trans.). New York: Humanities Press.
- (1979). The new rhetoric and the humanities: Essays on rhetoric and its applications. Dordrecht: D. Reidel.
- (1982). The realm of rhetoric. (W. Kluback, Trans. ). Notre Dame: University of Notre Dame Press.

With Lucie Olbrechts-Tyteca

- (1969). The new rhetoric: A treatise on argumentation. (J. Wilkinson and P. Weaver, Trans. ). Notre Dame: University of Notre Dame Press.

== Sources and further reading ==
- Alan G. Gross, Ray D. Dearin: Chaim Perelman. SUNY Press, 2003, ISBN 0-7914-5559-9.
- Arnold, C. (1970). Perelman's new rhetoric. Quarterly Journal of Speech, 55, 87–92.
- Dearin, R. D. (1989). The new rhetoric of Chaim Perelman: Statement and response. Lanham: University Press of America.
- ____________(1969). The philosophical basis of Chaim Perleman's theory of rhetoric. Quarterly Journal of Speech, 55, 213–24.
- Golden, J. L. and Pilotta, J. J., Eds. (1986). Practical reasoning in human affairs: Studies in honor of Chaim Perelman. Boston: D. Reidel.
- Maneli, M. (1994). Perelman's new rhetoric as philosophy and methodology for the next century. Boston: Kluwer.
- Ray, J. W. (John W.) (1978). Perelman's universal audience. Quarterly Journal of Speech, 64, 361–75.
