= Nikola Biller-Andorno =

Nikola Biller-Andorno (born 1971) is a physician, philosopher, and bioethicist with German and Swiss nationality. She is Professor and Chair of Biomedical Ethics at the University of Zurich and Director of the Institute of Biomedical Ethics and History of Medicine, a WHO Collaborating Centre for Bioethics. Her research focuses on biomedical ethics and health policy, with particular attention to health-system governance, patient-centred care, digital health and artificial intelligence, and global public health ethics. She has worked in ethics at the World Health Organization, held a professorship in medical ethics at Charité Berlin, served as president of the International Association of Bioethics, and is a member of the European Group on Ethics in Science and New Technologies.

== Early life and education ==
Biller-Andorno studied medicine at the University of Erlangen-Nuremberg, where she passed the state medical examination in 1996 and received a Dr. med. in 1997. She also studied philosophy at the University of Hagen, receiving an M.A. in 1996 and a Dr. phil. in 2001. She completed her habilitation in ethics and theory of medicine at the University of Göttingen in 2002. In 2018, she obtained a Master of Health Business Administration from the University of Erlangen-Nuremberg.

== Academic career ==
From 1998 to 2002, Biller-Andorno was Assistant Professor at the Department of Medical Ethics and History of Medicine at the University of Göttingen. From 2002 to 2004, she worked as an ethicist at the World Health Organization in Geneva, contributing to WHO ethics work on topics including organ transplantation, biobanks and human-subjects research. She has also contributed to WHO expert work on ethical issues in social listening and infodemic management. In 2004, she was appointed Professor of Medical Ethics at Charité – Universitätsmedizin Berlin.

In 2005, Biller-Andorno was appointed Full Professor of Biomedical Ethics at the University of Zurich. Since 2007, she has served as founding director of the Institute of Biomedical Ethics, which became the Institute of Biomedical Ethics and History of Medicine in 2014. The institute was designated a WHO Collaborating Centre for Bioethics in 2009. Her institutional roles have included ethics work at the World Health Organization, a professorship in medical ethics at Charité Berlin, the founding directorship of the Zurich institute, and membership in European and Swiss science-policy advisory bodies.

From 2012 to 2013, Biller-Andorno was a Commonwealth Fund Harkness Fellow in Health Care Policy and Practice at the Harvard School of Public Health and the New England Journal of Medicine, and a visiting professor in the Division of Medical Ethics at Harvard Medical School. From 2013 to 2014, she was a Safra Network Fellow at Harvard University. From 2016 to 2020, she held a fellowship at the Swiss Institute of Advanced Study (Collegium Helveticum) focused on the digital transformation of medicine. From 2021 to 2025, she served as Vice Dean for Innovation and Digitalization at the Faculty of Medicine of the University of Zurich.

== Research ==
Biller-Andorno's research focuses on biomedical ethics and health policy. Her work has addressed the ethical governance of health systems, patient-centred care and patient experiences, digital health and artificial intelligence, and global public health ethics. Earlier work included ethical issues in transplantation medicine, biobanks, human-subjects research, and health-care financing. Her work on patient-centred care has included research on patient experiences, medical humanities, and the use of patient narratives in learning health systems.

A strand of her work concerns the role of artificial intelligence in clinical decision-making and patient preference prediction. In 2019, she and Armin Biller published “Algorithm-Aided Prediction of Patient Preferences — An Ethics Sneak Peek” in the New England Journal of Medicine. This work was followed by further research on the ethical and practical challenges of algorithmic prediction of patients’ goals of care. She has also co-authored work on the role of AI in health information dissemination.

== Policy and advisory roles ==
Biller-Andorno has held several roles at the interface of bioethics, science policy, and institutional governance. She served as president of the International Association of Bioethics from 2009 to 2011. She is a member of the European Group on Ethics in Science and New Technologies, an independent advisory body of the European Commission that provides advice on ethical, societal, and fundamental-rights issues arising from science and new technologies. She is also a member of the Global Future Council of the World Economic Forum (GFC Generative Biology, 2025-2026). Her policy-related work has addressed ethical issues in global health, public health governance, and emerging technologies in medicine.

In Switzerland, Biller-Andorno served on the National Research Council of the Swiss National Science Foundation, joining Division IV (Programmes) in 2020 and serving as Vice President of the division from 2022. She was subsequently elected to the SNSF Foundation Council. In 2025, she was appointed to the Conseil d’orientation stratégique of the University of Geneva for the 2025–2029 term. She is also a Senate member of the Swiss Academy of Medical Sciences.

== Awards and recognition ==
Biller-Andorno was elected to Die Junge Akademie at the Berlin-Brandenburg Academy of Sciences and Humanities and the German National Academy of Sciences Leopoldina in 2001 and was a member until 2006. She was a Commonwealth Fund Harkness Fellow in Health Care Policy and Practice in 2012–2013 and later became a Senior Fellow of the Commonwealth Fund. She was elected a Fellow of the Hastings Center. In 2024, she received the Dr. Margrit Egnér Foundation Prize for work related to patient autonomy and psychiatric advance directives. In 2025, she was a co-recipient, with Giovanni Spitale and Federico Germani, of the SNIS International Geneva Award for work on “The Dual Nature of AI in Information Dissemination: Ethical Considerations.”

== Selected publications ==
- Nikola Biller-Andorno, Julian W. März, Corine Mouton-Dorey and Stéphanie Dagron, eds., Proportionality: A Guiding Principle in Public Health Law, Ethics, and Policy. Oxford: Oxford University Press, 2026.
- Nikola Biller-Andorno, Manuel Trachsel, Jens Gaab, John Z. Sadler and Şerife Tekin, eds., The Oxford Handbook of Psychotherapy Ethics. Oxford: Oxford University Press, 2021.
- Nikola Biller-Andorno and Peter Jüni, “Abolishing Mammography Screening Programs? A View from the Swiss Medical Board,” New England Journal of Medicine 370, no. 21 (2014): 1965–1967.
- Nikola Biller-Andorno and Thomas Zeltner, “Individual Responsibility and Community Solidarity — The Swiss Health Care System,” New England Journal of Medicine 373, no. 23 (2015): 2193–2197.
- Nikola Biller-Andorno and Armin Biller, “Algorithm-Aided Prediction of Patient Preferences — An Ethics Sneak Peek,” New England Journal of Medicine 381, no. 15 (2019): 1480–1485.
- Susanne Joebges and Nikola Biller-Andorno, “Ethics guidelines on COVID-19 triage—an emerging international consensus,” Critical Care 24 (2020): 201.
- Jeffrey David Iqbal, Michael Krauthammer and Nikola Biller-Andorno, “The Use and Ethics of Digital Twins in Medicine,” Journal of Law, Medicine & Ethics 50, no. 3 (2022): 583–596.
- Andrea Ferrario, Sophie Gloeckler and Nikola Biller-Andorno, “Ethics of the algorithmic prediction of goal of care preferences: from theory to practice,” Journal of Medical Ethics 49, no. 3 (2023): 165–174.
- Giovanni Spitale, Nikola Biller-Andorno and Federico Germani, “AI model GPT-3 (dis)informs us better than humans,” Science Advances 9, no. 26 (2023): eadh1850.
