= Phronesis =

Ancient Greek word for a type of wisdom or intelligence

In ancient Greek philosophy, phronesis (Ancient Greek: φρόνησις, romanized: phrónēsis) refers to the type of wisdom or intelligence concerned with practical action. It implies good judgment and excellence of character and habits. In Aristotelian ethics, the concept is distinguished from other words for wisdom and intellectual virtues (such as episteme and sophia) because of its practical character.

== Ancient Greek philosophy ==
=== Socrates ===
In some of Socrates's dialogues, he proposes that phronēsis is a necessary condition for all virtue, and that to be good is to be an intelligent or reasonable person with intelligent and reasonable thoughts. In Plato's Meno, Socrates writes that phronēsis is the most important attribute to learn, although it cannot be taught and is instead gained through the understanding of one's own self.

=== Aristotle ===
In Aristotle's work, phronesis is the intellectual virtue that helps turn one's moral instincts into practical action. He writes that moral virtues help any person to achieve the end, and that phronesis is what it takes to discover the means to gain that end. Without moral virtues, phronesis degenerates into an inability to make practical actions in regards to genuine goods for man.

In the sixth book of Aristotle's Nicomachean Ethics, he distinguished the concepts of sophia (wisdom) and phronesis, and described the relationship between them and other intellectual virtues. He writes that Sophia is a combination of nous, the ability to discern reality, and epistēmē, things that "could not be otherwise". He then writes that Phronesis involves not only the ability to decide how to reach a certain end, but the ability to reflect upon and determine "good ends" as well.

Aristotle also writes that although sophia is higher and more serious than phronesis, the pursuit of wisdom and happiness requires both, as phronesis facilitates sophia. According to Aristotle's theory of rhetoric, phronesis is one of the three types of appeals to character (ethos).

Aristotle claims that gaining phronesis requires gaining experience, as he writes:

...although the young may be experts in geometry and mathematics and similar branches of knowledge [sophoi], we do not consider that a young man can have Prudence [phronimos]. The reason is that Prudence [phronesis] includes a knowledge of particular facts, and this is derived from experience, which a young man does not possess; for experience is the fruit of years.

== Modern philosophy ==
According to philosophers Kristjánsson, Fowers, Darnell and Pollard, phronesis means making decisions in regards to moral events or circumstances. This four-component philosophical account became known as the Aristotelian Phronesis Model, or APM. There is recent work to return the virtue of practical judgement to overcome disagreements and conflicts in the form of Aristotle's phronesis.

== In social sciences ==
In Alasdair MacIntyre's book After Virtue, he called for a phronetic social science. He writes that for every prediction made by social scientific theory there are usually counter-examples, meaning that the unpredictability of human beings and human life requires focus on practical experiences.

In psychologist Heiner Rindermann's book Cognitive Capitalism, he uses the term phronesis to describe a rational approach to thinking and acting, "a circumspect and thoughtful way of life in a rational manner".

Critiques of the APM's empirical limitations led to McLoughlin, Thoma, and Kristjánsson developing the neo-Aristotelian Phronesis Model (neo-APM), which refines the construct using contemporary psychometric techniques. This updated model empirically identified ten distinct components and employed network analysis to highlight the interconnectedness and centrality of key elements, such as aspired moral identity and moral deliberation. The neo-APM thus provides a more nuanced and empirically valid framework for understanding practical wisdom in psychological and educational contexts.

== See also ==
- Casuistry – Reasoning by extrapolation
- Common sense – Sound practical judgement in everyday matters
- Dianoia – Human cognitive faculty
- Doctrine of the Mean – Central doctrine of Confucianism
- Élan vital – Hypothetical explanation for evolution and development of organisms
- Judgement – Evaluation of circumstances to make a decision
- Rhetorical reason – Faculty of discovering the crux of the matter
- Nepsis – Eastern Orthodox concept of wakefulness
- Metanoia (disambiguation)

== Sources and further reading ==
- Andorno, Roberto (2012). "Do our moral judgements need to be guided by principles?". Cambridge Quarterly of Healthcare Ethics. 21 (4): 457–465. doi:10.1017/S0963180112000230. PMID 22828040. S2CID 29078995.
- Bernasconi, Robert (1989). "Heidegger's Destruction of Phronesis". Southern Journal of Philosophy. 28 supp.: 127–147.
- Geertz, Clifford (2001). "Empowering Aristotle". Science. 293 (5527): 53. doi:10.1126/science.1062054. S2CID 144219739. Archived from the original on 2011-05-31.
- Heidegger, Martin (1997). Plato's Sophist. Bloomington: Indiana University Press.
- Hughes, Gerard J. (2001). Routledge Philosophy Guidebook to Aristotle on Ethics. London: Psychology Press. ISBN 0-415-22187-0.
- Krajewski, Bruce (2011). "The dark side of phrónēsis: revisiting the political incompetence of philosophy". Classica. 24 (1/2): 7–21. doi:10.14195/2176-6436_24_1.
- MacIntyre, Alasdair C. (2000). After virtue: a study in moral theory. London: Duckworth. ISBN 0-7156-1663-3.
- McNeill, William (1999). The Glance of the Eye: Heidegger, Aristotle, and the Ends of Theory. Albany: State University of New York Press.
- Nonaka, Ikujiro; Toyama, Ryoko; Hirata, Toru (2008). Managing Flow: A Process Theory of the Knowledge-Based Firm. New York: Palgrave Macmillan.
- Rorty, Amélie, ed. (1980). Essays on Aristotle's Ethics. Univ. of California Press. ISBN 0-520-04041-4.
- Sorabji, Richard (1973–1974). "Aristotle on the Role of Intellect in Virtue". Proceedings of the Aristotelian Society. 74: 107–129. doi:10.1093/aristotelian/74.1.107. Reprinted in Rorty.
- Wiggins, David (1975–1976). "Deliberation and Practical Reason". Proceedings of the Aristotelian Society. 76: 29–51. doi:10.1093/aristotelian/76.1.29. Reprinted in Rorty.
