= Metanoia (theology) =

Spiritual conversion in theology

In Christian theology, the term metanoia (from the Greek μετάνοια, metanoia, changing one's mind) is often translated as "conversion" or "repentance", though most scholars agree that this second translation does a disservice to the original Greek meaning of metanoia.

In Christianity, especially in Orthodox Christianity, the Greek philosophical concept of metanoia has become linked with Christian prayer, in which a prostration is called a metanoia, with "the spiritual condition of one's soul being expressed through the physical movement of falling facedown before the Lord" as seen in the biblical passages of Matthew 2:11, Luke 5:12, and Luke 17:15–16. In this context, the term suggests repudiation, change of mind, repentance, and atonement. The most direct translation of the term "metanoia" from the Greek to English is "think again".

The theological concept of repentance is linked with metanoia, which is a prostration before God, both spiritually and physically.

== Christianity ==
=== New Testament ===
All three synoptic gospels refer to "metanoia", as does the Acts of the Apostles, and there are a number of occasions in the New Testament letters where the word is used. Modern English Bible translations use the word "repentance" for both the Greek words metanoia and metamelomai. The former term is so translated almost ten times as often as the latter. The noun metanoia/μετάνοια, is translated "repentance", and its cognate verb metanoeō/μετανοέω is translated "repent" in twenty two instances in the King James Version of the New Testament.

Abid Rogers Bhatti in his book A Textbook of Soteriology writes about the meaning of metanoia/μετάνοια. In the Bible translations into Hindi and Urdu, the word for "repentance" is toba. Toba means regret, grief, and sorrow over sinful deeds that lead to a change of mind and life. Abid agrees with Tertullian in preferring "conversion" rather than "repentance" to translate metanoia/μετάνοια in Mark 1:4. In summary, Abid believes that "conversion" (rather than "repentance") is the best English word to express the meaning of the Greek metanoia/μετάνοια.

The Greek Orthodox Church in America teaches the following:

The Greek term metanoia denotes a change of mind, a reorientation, a fundamental transformation of outlook, of man's vision of the world and of himself, and a new way of loving others and God. In the words of a second-century text, The Shepherd of Hermas, it implies "great understanding", or discernment.

=== Early Christianity ===
Metanoia "... was used consistently in the literature of that time to express a fundamental change in thinking that leads to a fundamental change in behavior and/or way of living". In 2006, an ecumenical group of scholars published a study of repentance in the Bible and the Church. After "a thorough examination of Hellenistic Jewish writings", the study found that for Jews living at the time of Jesus, "repentance" meant "a fundamental change in thinking and living". For the New Testament, this change is a necessary ingredient in accomplishing God's plan for salvation for community and for everyone.

The non-canonical Acts of Peter ties metanoia to the cross on which Peter was crucified. While Peter was being crucified, he explained parts of the cross from which he was hanging, including "the nail which holds the cross beam to the upright in the middle". This nail is "the conversion [epistrophē] and repentance [metanoia] of man".

According to Robert N. Wilkin, "The Latin Fathers translated metanoia as paenitentia, which came to mean 'penance' or 'acts of penance'." Tertullian protested the unsuitable translation of the Greek metanoeo into the Latin paenitentiam ago by arguing that "in Greek, metanoia is not a confession of sins but a change of mind." "Conversion" (from the Latin conversiōn-em turning round) with its "change in character" meaning is more nearly the equivalent of metanoia than repentance.

=== Theological concept ===
The Merriam-Webster Dictionary transliterates the Greek μετάνοια into metanoia and borrowing it as an English word with a definition that matches the Greek: "a transformative change of heart; especially: a spiritual conversion", augmented by an explanation of metanoia's Greek source: "from metanoiein to change one's mind, repent, from meta- + noein to think, from nous mind. Synonyms for "conversion" include "change of heart" and "metanoia".

In opposition to the Church's interpretation of metanoia as comprising contrition, confession, and penances, Martin Luther objected that it retained its classical sense of "a change of mind". For John Staupitz, "... metanoia can be derived, though not without violence, not only from post and mentem, but also from trans and mentem, so that metanoia signifies a changing of the mind and heart, because it seemed to indicate not only a change of the heart, but also a manner of changing it, i.e., the grace of God." Metanoia is a concept of fundamental character for Luther, as it marks the ground of the first of his 95 theses.

John Calvin pointed to the double derivation of the Hebrew and Greek words for "repentance": the Hebrew derives from conversion, or turning again, and the Greek means a change of mind and purpose. The meaning of the word, for Calvin, is appropriate to both derivations because repentance (a) involves "withdrawing from ourselves", (b) turning to God, (c) "laying aside the old", and (d) putting on "a new mind".

Gregory Martin, the translator of the Douay-Rheims Bible, argued in chapter 13 of his work A Discovery of the Manifold Corruptions of Scripture for the translation of "penance". He based his conclusions on the writings of the church fathers and the awkward sentences that other readings lead to.

In his 1881 The Great Meaning of the Word Metanoia, Treadwell Walden, Episcopal priest and sometime rector of St. Paul's Church, Boston, designated cathedral of the diocese in 1912, asserts that metanoia conveys the essence of the Christian gospel. Walden holds that the meaning of the Greek metanoia is very different from the meaning of the English "repentance". He describes the translation of metanoia as repentance as "an extraordinary mistranslation". Walden believed the meaning of metanoia as a "transmutation" of consciousness contrasted with classical Greek which he viewed as expressing a superficial change of mind. Walden sought to promote the proper meaning of metanoia as "change of Mind, a change in the trend and action of the whole inner nature, intellectual, affectional and moral" over against its translation as repentance.

In Repentance: A Cosmic Shift of Mind and Heart, Edward J.Anton observes that in most dictionaries and in the minds of most Christians the primary meaning of "repent" is to look back on past behavior with sorrow, self-reproach, or contrition, sometimes with an amendment of life. But neither Jesus nor John the Baptist says to look back in sorrow. For St Paul, "metanoia is a transfiguration for your brain" that opens a new future.

It was in its use in the New Testament and in writings grounded in the New Testament that the depth of metanoia increased until, in the words of Archbishop Richard C. Trench, it came "to express that mighty change in mind, heart, and life wrought by the Spirit of God".

Scholar J. Glentworth Butler says that, in the Greek, there is none of the sorrow or regret contained in the words repentance and repent. Repentance denotes "sorrow for what one has done or omitted to do; especially, contrition for sin." Repent primarily means "to review one's actions and feel contrition or regret for something one has done or omitted to do" Therefore, Butler asserts that translating metanoeō/μετανοέω and metanoia/μετάνοια as repent and repentance constitute "an utter mistranslation" that translators excuse by the fact that no English word can adequately convey the meaning of the Greek words.

A. T. Robertson concurs with Butler. Regarding the translation of metanoia as repentance, Robertson calls it "a linguistic and theological tragedy". Regarding John the baptizer's call to "repent" as a translation of the Greek metanoeite, Robertson quotes Broadus as saying that this is "the worst translation in the New Testament". Repent means "to be sorry", but John's call was not to be sorry, but to change mental attitudes [metanoeite] and conduct. Robertson lamented the fact that in his time there was no English word that signified the meaning of the Greek μετάνοια (metanoia).

Aloys H. Dirksen in his The New Testament Concept of Metanoia argues against metanoia as merely "repentance" and for metanoia as "conversion". Others have characterized the translation of metanoia/μετάνοια as "repentance" with similar negativity: Herbert George Marsh states that "repentance" is an "unsuitable" translation, and James Hastings and others consider it "totally inadequate" as a word to carry the meaning of metanoia.

Of the top ten versions of the Bible in the United States based on unit sales, seven read "baptism of repentance" in Mark 1:4 in which "repentance" translates metanoia. Three of the ten top-selling versions and another in the top-ten based on dollar sales attempt to capture the meaning of metanoia. None of them transliterate the Greek μετἀνοια as metanoia.

- New Living Translation: "baptized to show that they had repented of their sins and turned to God"
- Common English Bible: "baptized to show that they were changing their hearts and lives"
- New International Readers Version: "baptized and turn away from their sins"
- The Message: "a baptism of life-change"

In spite of these efforts, Robert N. Wilkin forecasts that "repentance" as a translation for metanoia will likely continue in most English translations. He, therefore, advises readers to substitute "change of mind" for the words repentance and repent.

In its Confirmation exegesis, the Minnehaha United Methodist Church of Minneapolis, Minnesota notes,

Metanoia is used to refer to the change of mind which is brought about in repentance. Repentance is necessary and valuable because it brings about change of mind or metanoia. This change of mind will make the changed person hate sin and love God. The two terms (repentance and metanoia) are often used interchangeably. "Meta-" is additionally used to imply "beyond" and "outside of". E.g., ... metaphysics as outside the limits of physics. The word metanoia has taken on an in-vogue usage among interfaith dialogues as simply meaning "a change of heart". Though this is close to its Christian theological meaning, perhaps one may conclude that metanoia is "taking one's mind/thoughts beyond and outside of one's habituations." Yes, English translators of the Christian Scriptures fail to find a proper corresponding word for metanoia, so they fall back upon the comfort and ease of the word repent. Yet repent carries with it a negative tone, almost an inhibition caused by guilt; metanoia forces a positive, proactive life-affirming response. When Jesus calls people to "repent", to "metanoia", could it be that he means: "Change your thought processes and go beyond your mind's present state of limitations"? Does this not mandate self-assessment and interpersonal acceptance?

Charles Taylor defines metanoia as "to change one's mind of attitude" and builds his pastoral counseling method on the "metanoia model". In doing so, Taylor recalls that the center of Jesus' ministry was a call to metanoia. For Milton Crum, metanoia means "a change of perception with its behavioral fruit." Thus, metanoia constitutes the central thing that needs to happen in preaching. Peter Senge observes that what happens in a "learning organization" that experiences the "deeper meaning of 'learning'" is "metanoia" which means "a shift of mind". Therefore, concludes Senge, "to grasp the meaning of 'metanoia' is to grasp the deeper meaning of 'learning'."

Ulrich Wilckens finds in Peter's sermon in Acts 2:38–40 as narrated by Luke the Evangelist, six steps that are required for a person's salvation. Metanoia is step number one and is essential because the other steps are contingent on a person's experiencing metanoia. Wilckens believes that this is the normative way to salvation in Luke's theology.

=== Christian prayer ===
The theological concept is linked with Christian prayer, in which a prostration is called a metanoia, with "the spiritual condition of one's soul being expressed through the physical movement of falling facedown before the Lord" as seen in the biblical passages of Matthew 2:11, Luke 5:12, and Luke 17:15–16.

In Oriental Orthodox Christianity and Western Orthodox Christianity, believers make metanoias (prostrations) during the seven fixed prayer times; prayer rugs are used by some adherents to provide a clean space for believers to offer their Christian prayers to God, e.g. the canonical hours. Oriental Orthodox Christians, such as Copts, incorporate metanoias in their prayers that are performed facing eastward in anticipation of the Second Coming of Jesus, making metanoias thrice in the name of the Trinity; at the conclusion of every Psalm (when saying 'Alleluia'); and forty-one times for the Kyrie eleisons (cf. Agpeya). Syriac Orthodox and Indian Orthodox Christians, as well as Christians belonging to the Mar Thoma Syrian Church (an Oriental Protestant denomination), make multiple metanoias at the seven fixed prayer times during which the canonical hours are prayed, thrice during the Qauma prayer, at the words "Crucified for us, Have mercy on us!", thrice during the recitation of the Nicene Creed at the words "And was incarnate of the Holy Spirit ...", "And was crucified for us ...", & "And on the third day rose again ...", as well as thrice during the Prayer of the Cherubim while praying the words "Blessed is the glory of the Lord, from His place forever!" (cf. Shehimo). Oriental Catholic and Oriental Protestant rites also use metanoias in a similar way as the Oriental Orthodox Churches.

Among Old Ritualists, a prayer rug known as the Podruchnik is used to keep one's face and hands clean during metanoias, as these parts of the body are used to make the sign of the cross.

== Other religions ==
=== Judaism ===
Joseph and Aseneth depicts Metanoia as "in heaven, a beautiful and especially good daughter of the Most High". There, "she entreats God Most High hourly" on behalf of people.

=== Paganism ===
In Classical Greek, metanoia meant changing one's mind about someone or something. When personified, Metanoia was a figure of unclear description who accompanied Kairos, the god of Opportunity, and ultimately inspired human individuals to deep changes in their normal consciousness modes; a feeling of personal regret would provide the emotional catalyst to approach life with a substantially different perspective.

This conventional portrayal continued through the Renaissance. "Regret, reflection, and transformation are always present in the concept of metanoia to some degree," writes scholar Kelly Myers.

== See also ==
- Genuflection
- Kneeling
- Metanoia (rhetoric)
