= Techne =

Philosophical term referring to "making" or "doing"

In Ancient Greek philosophy, techne (Greek: τέχνη, romanized: tékhnē, lit. 'art, skill, craft'; Ancient Greek: [tékʰnɛː], Modern Greek: [ˈtexni]) is a philosophical concept that refers to making or doing. Today, while the Ancient Greek definition of techne is similar to the modern definition and use of "practical knowledge", techne can include various fields such as mathematics, geometry, medicine, shoemaking, rhetoric, philosophy, music, and astronomy.

One of the definitions of techne led by Aristotle, for example, is "a state involving true reason concerned with production".

== History of the term ==
Many Ancient Greek philosophers, such as Socrates, Plato, and Aristotle, had difficulty coming up with a single definition for techne and there is differentiation between the ways that these philosophers used the term.

The word techne comes from the Greek word for art, skill, craft, and technique. The modern-day English word technology comes from the prefix techne and the suffix ology; both words are of Greek origin combined to mean "the practical application of knowledge". Techne in Ancient Greece was thought of as dangerous in its virtues by many philosophers, including Plato. Arts such as paintings and sculptures were particularly thought to be unvirtuous because of their "third-hand [representation] of "true" reality and absolute beauty". Other philosophers, such as Aristotle, believed that techne was virtuous because it uses natural materials "to create objects unknown in nature" and therefore it "completes nature".

== Ancient Greek Philosophers ==
=== Socrates ===
The Ancient Greek philosopher Xenophon wrote down conversations he had with Socrates in the Socratic works Memorabilia and Oeconomicus. In both of these works, Socrates uses episteme and techne interchangeably. Crafts that Socrates classifies as techne include harp playing, flute playing, dancing, wrestling, medicine, carpentry, ruling, generalship, housebuilding, running a household, farming, and mathematics.

=== Plato ===
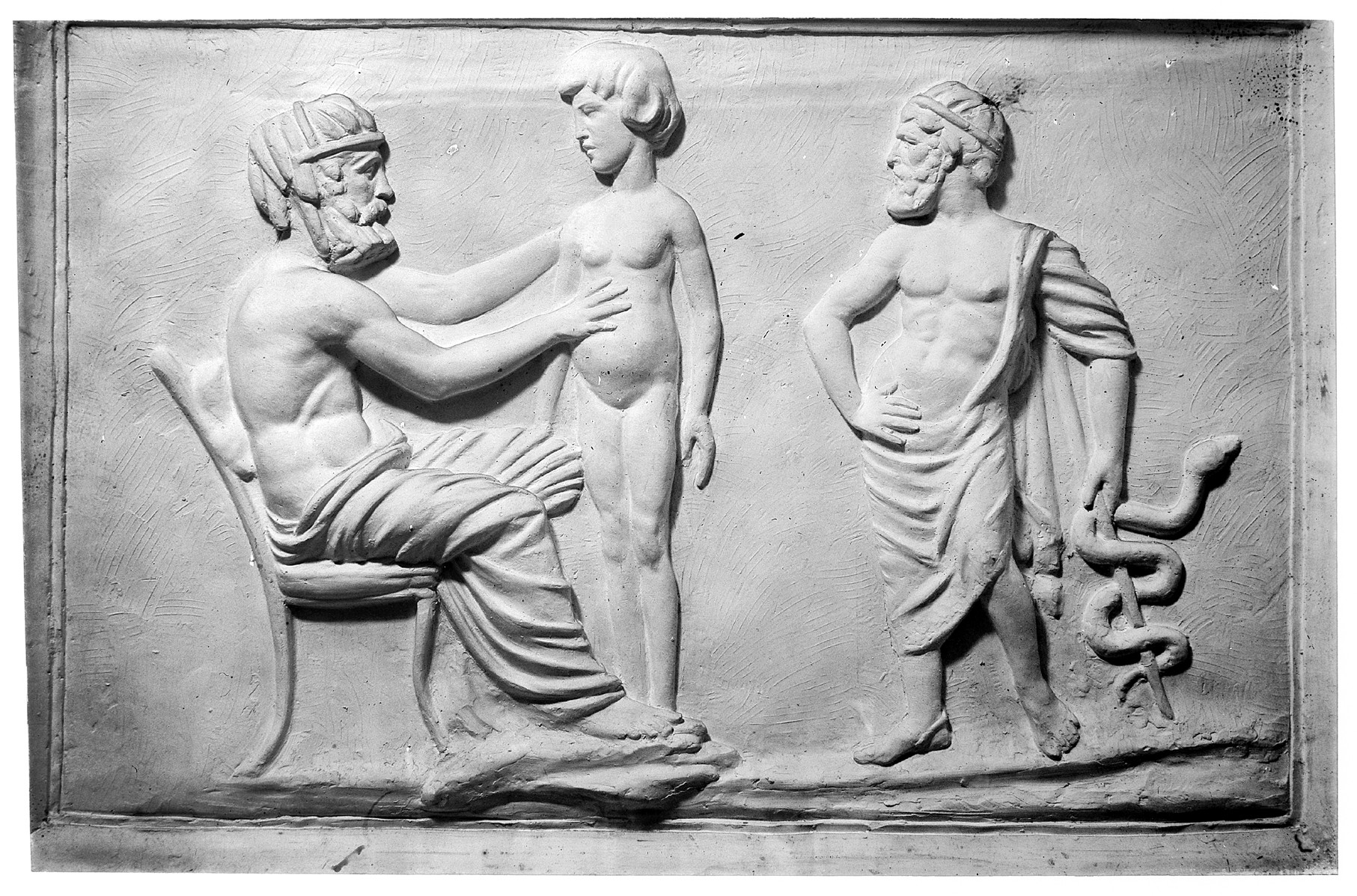
Plaster cast of Ancient Greek physician and patient from Wellcome Historical Medical Museum

The Ancient Greek Philosopher Plato often used episteme and techne interchangeably, much like Socrates. This is because Plato was a student of Socrates and also wrote Socratic works. Plato's works define techne as activities such as medicine, geometry, politics, music, shipbuilding, carpentry, and generalship. Plato's dialogues introduce the idea of a practitioner connected to a craft, such as a physician with medicine. Plato introduced the idea of techne as a way to explain aspects of life such as virtue. This increased the complexity of the definition of techne, adding that crafts are separated by what the end product will be or what the activity accomplishes. Plato's writings also reveal that he believed the most important job of the practitioner was to be able to explain what they were doing and why they were doing it.

=== Aristotle ===
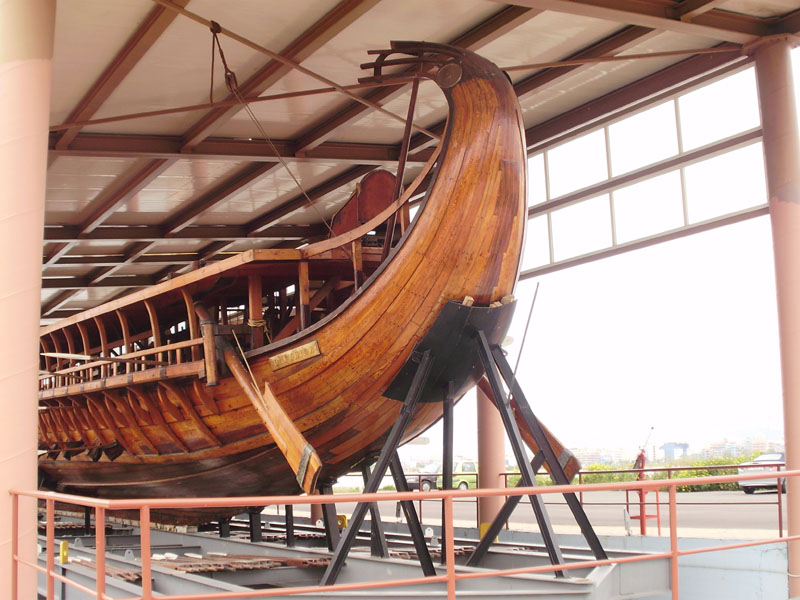
Model of Ancient Greek Trireme in Athens, Greece

Aristotle does not use techne and episteme interchangeably as Socrates and Plato did before him. He distinguishes clearly between the two terms. Aristotle includes techne and episteme in his five virtues of intellect: episteme, techne, phronesis, sophia, and nous. In Nicomachean Ethics, Aristotle wrote that techne not only meant craft but also production (for example: the production of a ship). Richard Parry wrote that Aristotle believed techne aims for good and forms an end, which could be the activity itself or a product formed from the activity. Aristotle used health as an example of an end that is produced by the techne of medicine. Like Plato's beliefs about the importance of a practitioner being able to explain their craft, Aristotle believed that the practitioner with the knowledge of techne could teach their skill because they not only had the wisdom of the craft but also understood the outcome.
