= New rhetoric =

New rhetoric is an interdisciplinary field advocating for the broadening of classical rhetorical canon.

== Overview ==
"New" rhetoric is the name for various efforts to reclaim the study and teaching of rhetoric from the unsavory reputation that it had developed, according to George Pullman, from association with "political lies, corporate spin ... purple prose, boiler-plate arrangement schemas, unimaginative reproductions of bullshit and so on." The New Rhetoricians hoped to restore the importance of rhetoric as a discipline to a level on par with that of other fields in social, cultural and linguistic studies.

The field is often dated to Chaïm Perelman's and Lucie Olbrechts-Tyteca's The New Rhetoric (1969) but both the notion and the idea for the need of "new" rhetoric, different from the "old" one, can be traced to the works of Kenneth Burke – A Rhetoric of Motives (1950) and Rhetoric: Old and New (1967).

The emergence of New Rhetoric was helped by the idea that rhetoric could be epistemic. An attempt to apply New Rhetoric as a social philosophy was made by the Polish philosopher Mieczysław Maneli in his 1994 book Perelman's New Rhetoric as Philosophy and Methodology for the Next Century. Maneli wrote: "The New Rhetoric is modern humanism. The struggle for humanism never ends. The most essential features to a humanistic approach to life are: individuals should be given the chance to develop their personal talents and energies; they should be able to be creative and become happy...Their essence and value are creativity and self-determination...Once new rhetoric took as its basic proposition that nothing is absolutely good or sacred except human dignity, one must constantly search for new values, for better forms, and ways of life. There are three specific areas that are especially important for modern humanism: social and individual justice, freedom from oppression with a genuine opportunity for a decent life, and tolerance and privacy."

New Rhetoric has an ambivalent relationship with Classical Rhetoric. For example, New Rhetoric attempts to break with the formalistic and logocentric (i.e. patriarchal) neo-Aristotelian analysis in favour of interplay between text and context, but according to DeGenaro it does not successfully place itself outside the "Western-patriarchal" tradition, as it is unable to depart from "elite backgrounds and scopes of study" to a diversity of voices, topics, etc. This probably makes New Rhetoric rather a ground for postmodern rhetoric which "puts into question the identities of the speaker, the audience, and the messages that pass between them" with evaluating the intersubjective philosophy because of the idea inherently accepted in postmodernistic philosophy that "differences cannot be overcome, in Hegelian fashion, by cancelling them under a higher-order synthesis, but must be eroded or defaced in the course of traversing them".

== See also ==
- Chicago school (literary criticism)
