= Andorno Station =

- U.S. National Register of Historic Places
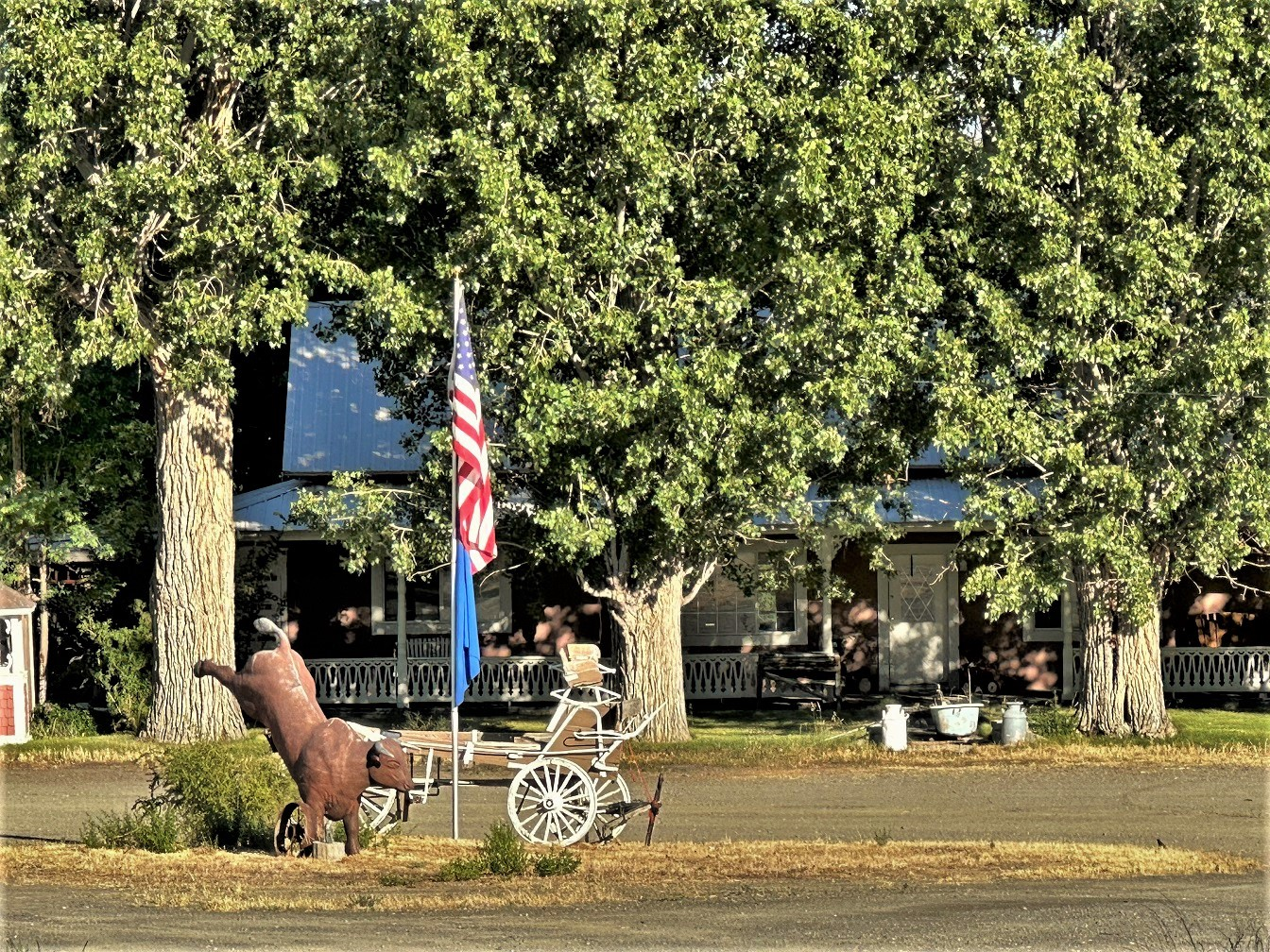
- Andorno Station in 2024

- Location within Nevada Location within the United States
- Location: 9535 U.S. Route 95, N.
- Nearest city: Winnemucca, Nevada
- Coordinates: 41°27′28″N 117°48′2″W
- Area: 320 acres (130 ha)
- Built: 1899-1900
- Architectural style: Late Victorian
- NRHP reference No.: 95000329
- Added to NRHP: March 30, 1995

Andorno Station near Winnemucca, Nevada is a historic stagecoach station and hotel site that dates from 1899. It includes Late Victorian architecture. It was listed on the National Register of Historic Places in 1995. The listing included six contributing buildings on 320 acres (130 ha).

The main house and five other contributing buildings (a wagon shed, a barn, a jail, a workshop, and a bunkhouse) were all built during 1899–1900. Newer buildings (a garage, a shop, and a walk-in freezer) are not contributing but do not detract greatly from the historic feeling of the property.
