= Michael Leff =

Michael Leff (1941–2010) was an internationally known U.S. scholar of rhetoric. He was a Professor and served as Chair of the Department of Communications Studies at the University of Memphis.

== Career ==
Before teaching at the University of Memphis he held faculty positions at The University of California-Davis, Indiana University, University of Wisconsin-Madison, and Northwestern University. He also served as editor of Rhetorica, the journal of the International Society for History of Rhetoric, and as the founding president of the American Society for the History of Rhetoric. Leff was an Argumentation Scholar and believed argumentation studies could bridge traditional divisions between dialectic and rhetoric.

Leff had many influential ideas about rhetoric in his scholarship. One idea that that is prevalent when studying his works is humanism and how it relates to rhetoric. The history of humanism constantly relates to Ciceronian principles and requires an intricate relationship between the orator and the audience. The humanistic approach to rhetoric was often distinguished as “Ciceronian Humanism” because Cicero played a dominant role throughout its history and development. Leff in particular argued a humanistic approach to rhetoric. He saw that the humanistic approach to rhetoric was necessarily vague and that it positioned the orator both as an individual who leads the audience and as a community member shaped and constrained by the demands of the audience. Another reason Leff argues for humanistic rhetoric is their view of the orator as a cultural hero that holds important oratorical power. Leff disagreed with aspects of the humanistic approach, such as their over-emphasis on the orator's individual agency, but recognized the importance of Renaissance humanists to the tradition as well.

Leff's voluminous scholarship also focused on the rhetorical artistry of Abraham Lincoln and neo-classical criticism. Neo-classical criticism was a central idea in Leff's critical work. In his work, “Lincoln at Cooper Union: Neo-classical Criticism Revisited” he uses Lincoln at Cooper Union to show a notable shift in ideals of neo-classical criticism. Leff refers to Abraham Lincoln “as our foremost rhetorical president [that] provides and ideal case for examination. Lincoln at Cooper Union displays the earliest example of the direction of close reading as a mode of criticism In Leff's work, he shows how Lincoln at Cooper Union is an example of how argument, style, and interlocking main points effectively have changed within neo-classical rhetoric.

Leff was a renowned critic of rhetoric; he was knowledgeable in many areas such as argumentation, humanism, and neo-classical criticism, which made his work so well known in the academy. For his many publications he was awarded the NCA Winans-Wicheln Award, the Woolbert award for influential scholarship, and the Ehinger Award for a sustained program of research. He was also awarded the Distinguished Research Award at the 2002 conference of the International Society for the study of Argumentation. In addition to these prestigious awards, Leff also mentored numerous graduate students who now lead in the fields of argumentation, rhetorical criticism, and the history of rhetoric.
