= Lucie Olbrechts-Tyteca =

Belgian academic

Lucie Olbrechts-Tyteca (1899–1987) was a Belgian academic, sociologist and longtime co-worker of the philosopher Chaïm Perelman. She volunteered in 1948 to support his work and developed several aspects of the New Rhetoric independently in later years.

== Life and work ==
Olbrechts-Tyteca was born into an important family of Brussels in 1899 and studied several humanities and social scientific methods at the University of Brussels without seeking a career. She married the statistician Raymond Olbrechts, eleven years older than herself, and lived an academical and social quiet life until she met Perelman in 1948.

Olbrechts-Tyteca and Perelman worked together between 1948 and 1984. During this time they worked out an influential contribution to argumentation theory. Their opus magnum Traité de l'argumentation : La nouvelle rhétorique led – together with Toulmin's The Uses of Argument published the same year – to the end of argumentative logicism. The concrete contribution of Olbrechts-Tyteca to this and the other joined works is disputed among scholars but prevailing opinion is that she contributed to the vast illustrative part, while Perelman outlined the abstract-theoretical aspects.
The Belgian academic established herself as an independent scholar with a work on rhetoric and humor, Le Comique du Discours, in 1974.

=== Work ===
- with Chaïm Perelman: Rhétorique et philosophie. Presses Universitaires de France, Paris, 1952.
- with Chaïm Perelman: Traité de l'argumentation : La nouvelle rhétorique. Presses Universitaires de France, Paris, 1958. English: The new rhetoric: A treatise on argumentation. (J. Wilkinson and P. Weaver, Trans.). Notre Dame: University of Notre Dame Press.
- Le Comique du Discours, Brussels Press, 1974.

== Literature ==
- Barbara Warnick: Lucie Olbrechts-Tyteca's Contribution to The New Rhetoric in: Molly Meijer Wertheimer (Ed.): Listening to Their Voices: The Rhetorical Activities of Historical Woman. Columbia: University of South Carolina Press, 1997; pp. 69–85.
- Noemi Mattis-Perelman: Perelman and Olbrechts-Tyteca: A Personal Recollection. Letter to Ray D. Dearin, August, 11. 1994. See. Gross/Dearin: Chaim Perelman, 2003; p. 153.
- David A. Frank; Michelle Bolduc: Lucie Olbrechts-Tyteca's New Rhetoric in Quarterly Journal of Speech, Vol. 96 No. 2, 2010, pp. 141 – 163.
