= Metanoia (rhetoric) =

Metanoia (from the Greek μετάνοια, metanoia, changing one's mind) in the context of rhetoric is a device used to retract a statement just made, and then state it in a better way. As such, metanoia is similar to correction. Metanoia is used in recalling a statement in two ways, either to weaken the prior declaration or to strengthen it.

Metanoia is later personified as a figure accompanying kairos, sometimes as a hag and sometimes as a young lady. Ausonius' epigrams describe her thus: "I am a goddess to whom even Cicero himself did not give a name. I am the goddess who exacts punishment for what has and has not been done, so that people regret it. Hence, my name is Metanoea."

== Weakening ==
The use of metanoia to weaken a statement is effective because the original statement still stands, along with the qualifying statement. For instance, when one says, "I will murder you. You shall be punished." the force of the original statement ("I will murder you") remains, while a more realistic alternative has been put forward ("you shall be punished").

== Strengthening ==
When it is used to strengthen a statement, metanoia works to ease the reader from a moderate statement to a more radical one, as in this quote from Marcus Aurelius's Meditations

I still fall short of it through my own fault, and through not observing the admonitions of the gods, and, I may almost say, their direct instructions (Book One);

Here Aurelius utilizes metanoia to move from a mild idea ("not observing the admonitions of the gods") to a more intense one ("not observing... their direct instructions"); the clause "I may almost say" introduces the metanoia.
