= Junge Akademie =

The Junge Akademie at the Berlin-Brandenburg Academy of Sciences and Humanities (BBAW) and the German National Academy of Sciences Leopoldina is supported by the two oldest scientific academies in Germany, and represents an interdisciplinary platform for up-and-coming academics. Its membership comprises fifty young academics and artists from a broad range of disciplines. All hail from the German-speaking countries and are committed to interdisciplinary discourse. Each year sees ten new members elected for a period of five years. The Junge Akademie was founded in 2000 as the world's first national institution for the promotion of young academics. Numerous countries have since used it as a model for the establishment of their own national academies for young academics.

== Tasks and objectives ==
According to its statutes, the purpose of the Junge Akademie is to promote young academics. Its two core tasks take the form of "fostering interdisciplinary discourse amongst outstanding young academics and promoting initiatives at the interface between academia and society".

== Organisation ==
The Junge Akademie is represented by three bodies: its general assembly, board, and advisory board. Its head office is located in Berlin at the Berlin-Brandenburg Academy of Sciences and Humanities close to Gendarmenmarkt. In addition to assuming responsibility for administrative and organisational tasks, the head office also provides members with practical support. The Junge Akademie has remained under the trusteeship of its two parent academies since its transformation from a temporary project to a permanent institution in 2011. Despite now being anchored in the budget of the Leopoldina, it is entirely autonomous in terms of the content of its activities. It is listed in the Stendal Register of Clubs and Societies along with the Leopoldina.

=== Members and admission procedure ===
The Junge Akademie consists of 50 members from across the German-speaking countries. Members are elected for a period of five years; re-election is not possible. Accordingly, there is a turnover of ten members per year. During their membership, the academicians can access a fixed personal budget as well as the central research budget. The latter serves to fund collaborative academic projects, workshops or symposia. Eligibility for membership is dependent on the completion of i) an outstanding doctorate no more than three to seven years before election and ii) at least one additional outstanding academic piece of work. Members of the BBAW, the Leopoldina, and the Junge Akademie are at liberty to put forward candidates for membership. The Junge Akademie also uses calls for application to attract new members. In addition, interested candidates are invited to put themselves forward independently. New members are elected on an annual basis by the General Assembly of the Junge Akademie on the one hand and its two parent academies on the other. The average age of the Akademie's membership is 35; its gender mix is almost equal and is not subject to any quota system. Members are equally spread across the natural sciences and the humanities/social sciences, and also include representatives from the fields of art and architecture.

=== Board ===
The Junge Akademie is managed by its board, which consists of a spokesperson and four further members of the Akademie. The spokesperson is granted guest status on the boards of the two parent academies (BBAW and Leopoldina). The board is elected by the general assembly at its spring meeting, and has a term of one year, beginning in the summer after the annual celebration event.

=== Advisory board ===
Founded in 2002, the advisory board is concerned with the substance of the Junge Akademie's work. It currently has seven members (2014 figure), and provides the Junge Akademie with both guidance and support. The advisory board consists of "high-ranking figures from the fields of academia, the economy, culture, and the media". They are each elected for a term of three years, and are to "act as a critical observer and advisor of the Junge Akademie, providing ideas and constructive criticism within the framework of specific projects and encouraging or posing questions to the Junge Akademie's members". They are also responsible for supporting projects at the interface between academia on the one hand and politics, the economy, and culture on the other.

=== Budget and funding ===
Since 2011, the Junge Akademie is no longer a project, but an independent institution. Its budget is permanently integrated in the overall budget of the Leopoldina. The Junge Akademie is state-funded; the Federal Ministry of Education and Research contributes 90 per cent while the state of Saxony-Anhalt and the Berlin-Brandenburg Academy of Sciences and Humanities contribute 5 per cent each.

== Activities ==
The Junge Akademie is at liberty to choose how and where it works. Unlike the situation in many other national academies, members of the Junge Akademie do not receive any direct instructions: It is up to them to decide which interdisciplinary projects make it onto the agenda. Each year sees members meet at three plenary sessions to discuss their current research projects and propose joint undertakings and publications. An annual ideas workshop also gives members an opportunity to develop new initiatives and projects. Subject-specific work is frequently carried out by Research Groups.

=== Research groups ===
The Junge Akademie's General Assembly establishes research groups (RGs) proposed by its members in order to promote interdisciplinary co-operation. RGs are open to all interested members. Working on a co-operative basis, they carry out studies, publish the results of their research, and organise symposia and cultural events. Over 40 of these interdisciplinary groups have been brought into existence since the founding of the Junge Akademie. In addition to research topics, they also deal with issues of general societal relevance, placing special emphasis on the fields of education and science policy.

=== International contacts ===
The Junge Akademie was the world's only institution of its type when founded in 2000. The intervening period has witnessed the establishment of numerous other national academies for young academics outside of Germany, including in Belgium (Flanders), Denmark, the Netherlands, Scotland, Sweden, and South Africa. The new institutions have often oriented themselves on the Junge Akademie. To cite an example, the Royal Netherlands Academy of Arts and Sciences founded its Jonge Akademie according to the German model. Indian National Young Academy of Sciences, New Delhi was founded on the Junge Akademie model in 2015. The Junge Akademie also played a key role in the founding of the Global Young Academy, which has been headquartered at the BBAW since October 2011.

=== Publications ===
Junge Akademie Magazin (JAM), which is also available online in PDF format, is published once every six months. Each edition is dedicated to a specific topic, which is examined from the perspective of a variety of academic disciplines. In addition, the magazine provides insights into the Akademie's activities, introduces new members, and presents the results of the various research groups. The work of the Junge Akademie is also presented and discussed in a large number of other publications.

== History ==
The Junge Akademie is a joint project of the Berlin-Brandenburg Academy of Sciences and Humanities (BBAW) and the German National Academy of Sciences Leopoldina. It was established as a result of its founders' critical stance on "the anomalies of the German academic system, which offers young academics few opportunities to develop without restriction and participate in the shaping of the system itself." The inspiration to establish the world's first academy for young academics came from Paul B. Baltes, former director of the Max Planck Institute for Human Development. It was in 1996 that he presented his idea to Dieter Simon, then president of the BBAW. The latter refined the blueprint, and in the same year presented it to an internal committee responsible for organising the celebration of the 300th anniversary of the BBAW. The celebration committee in turn recommended to the General Assembly that "the proposal made by Paul B. Baltes and Dieter Simon regarding the foundation of an academy for highly talented young academics be adopted, with the new institution to be established upon the election of founding members during the anniversary year". When passing the concept for establishment of the "Young Academy at the Berlin-Brandenburg Academy of Sciences and Humanities" at a session held on February 12, 1999, the General Assembly suggested that the idea should be implemented in co-operation with the German National Academy of Sciences Leopoldina, with which the BBAW was already planning a close partnership in the medium term. Subsequent discussions between the presidents of the two organisations quickly bore fruit, and before the beginning of the summer of 1999 the Leopoldina announced its decision in favour of getting involved in the Junge Akademie – and with it the initiation of the first joint project of the nascent co-operation between the two organisations. The Junge Akademie was founded by its two parent academies on June 30, 2000, and initially took the form of a five-year project based at the BBAW under the auspices of Edelgard Bulmahn, then Federal Minister of Education. The project phase of the Akademie's existence was financed by funds from the Federal Ministry of Education and Research and the Volkswagen Foundation (limited to 2005, subsequently extended to 2008). The positive results arrived at by a project evaluation carried out in 2005 convinced the Federal Ministry of Education and Research to extend financing for another five years (i.e. until 2010). An expert commission re-evaluated the Junge Akademie in 2007, concluding in its final report that "[...] as an instrument for the provision of institutional support to highly gifted young academics in Germany, the Junge Akademie is not only unique, but also incomparable with other German academies in terms of its promotion of young talent." With the ten-year project phase having finished in 2010, 2011 saw the Junge Akademie become an institution operated on a permanent basis and firmly anchored in the budget of the Leopoldina. It has since been financed by the Federal Ministry for Education and Research as well as the federal states of Saxony-Anhalt, Berlin, and Brandenburg.
