= Roberto Andorno =

Argentine writer

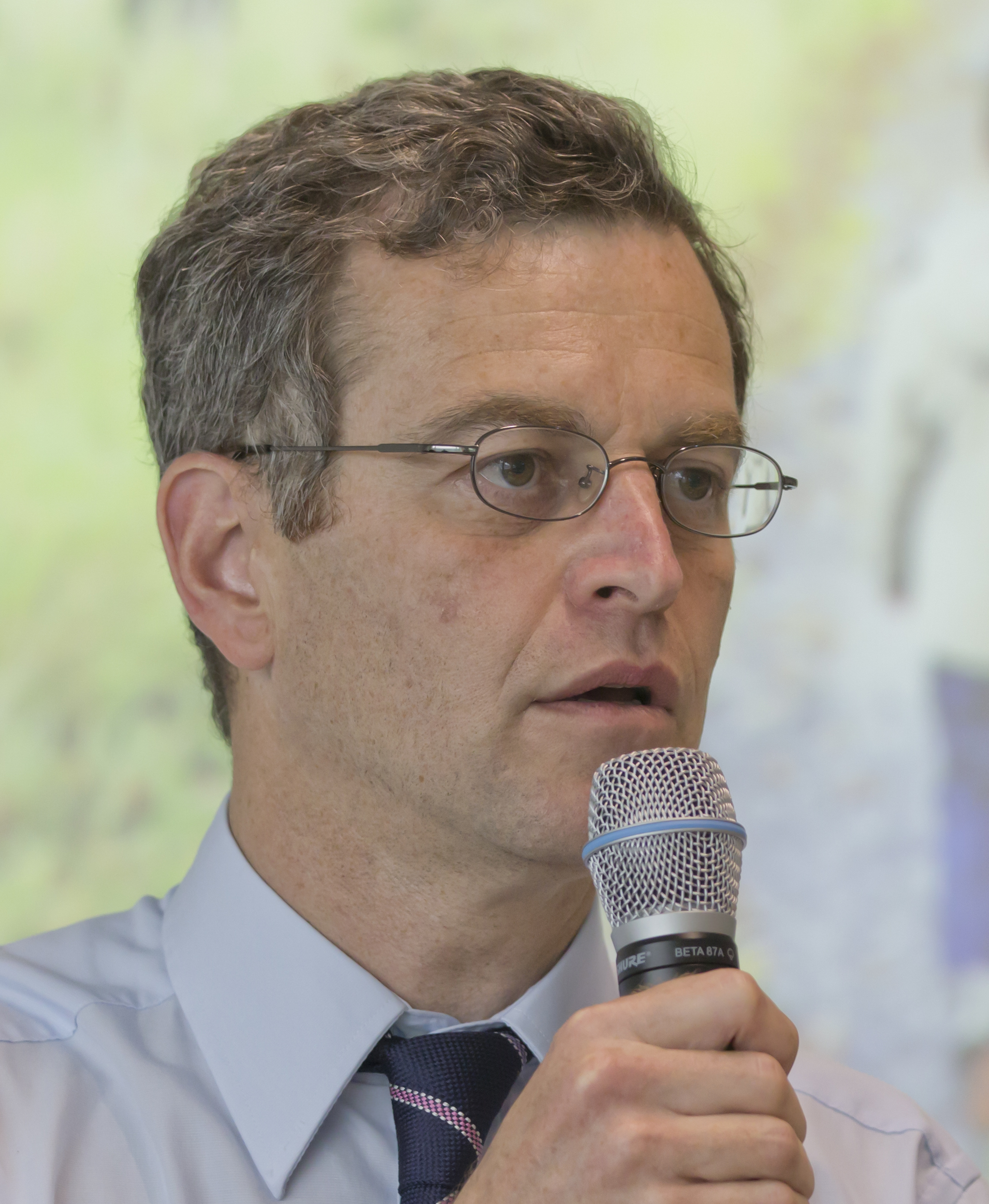
R Andorno

Roberto Andorno is Privatdozent at the Faculty of Law, University of Zurich (Switzerland). Until August 2026 he was also a Research Fellow at the University's Institute of Biomedical Ethics and Medical History, where he coordinated the PhD Program in biomedical ethics and law. Originally from Argentina, he holds doctoral degrees in law from the Universities of Buenos Aires (1991) and Paris XII (1994), both on topics related to the ethical and legal aspects of assisted reproductive technologies. Between 1999 and 2005 he conducted various research projects relating to global bioethics, human dignity, and human rights at the Laval University (Quebec, Canada), and at the Universities of Göttingen and Tübingen, in Germany.

From 1998 to 2005 he served as a member of the International Bioethics Committee (IBC) of UNESCO, and participated in this capacity in the drafting of the International Declaration on Human Genetic Data (2003) and of the Universal Declaration on Bioethics and Human Rights (2005).
