= SCCT =

SCCT could refer to:

- The Suez Canal Container Terminal, a transshipment center for the Eastern Mediterranean at the Northern entrance to the Suez Canal
- Tom Clancy's Splinter Cell: Chaos Theory, a video game
- Simple cycle combustion turbine, a type of gas turbine
- Situational crisis communication theory, a public relations theory regarding crisis communication
- Supply chain control tower, a supply-chain coordination and decision-support system
