= Third persona =

Audience excluded or othered by a speaker

The third persona is the implied audience which is not present in, or is excluded from, rhetorical communication. This conception of the Third Persona relates to the First Persona, the "I" in discourse (a speaker and their intent), and the second persona, the "you" in discourse. Third Persona is "the 'it' that is not present, that is objectified in a way that 'you' and 'I' are not." Third Persona, as a theory, seeks to define and critique the rules of rhetoric, to further consider how we talk about what we talk about—the discourse of discourse—and who is affected by that discourse. The concept of the third persona encourages examination of who (what category of implied audience) is implicitly excluded from a discourse, why they are excluded, and what this can tell us about how that discourse participates in larger networks of social or political power.

Third persona is the way in which a text alienates or excludes one portion of its audience ('they') in the process of addressing and engaging with another portion, a "second persona" ('you'). For example, the song "Stand by your man" (by Tammy Wynette and Billy Sherrill) begins: "Sometimes it's hard to be a woman/ Giving all your love to just one man." While the first line seems to address (all) women, the second asserts that a (any) woman will have love for a man, implicitly excluding women who do not have, want, or love a man, including lesbians (for whom it will presumably not be "hard to be a woman"). The categories of implicit exclusion made within the text is called the "third persona." The term thus refers to patterns of address within the text itself, that portion of an imagined audience excluded and silenced by the text. The concept was coined by Philip Wander in his article "The Third Persona: An Ideological Turn in Rhetorical Theory," first published in 1984 after a prolonged debate in the Central States Speech Journal. The debate opens with Wander’s article, “The Ideological Turn in Modern Criticism,” which advocates the practice of ideological critique. The essay was met with a series of critical responses. Allan Megill, for example, criticized Wander’s “cursory reading of several of Heidegger’s essays.” Wander wrote “The Third Persona” as his rejoinder.

== Rooted in ideological criticism ==
Wander, in his 1984 article, explores and critiques many facets of rhetorical method. His goals are writ large, that, for example, "To be progressive, change must progress toward something. That something, oriented around traditional humanist notions of human potential, is grounded in the emancipation of human potential." These altruistic goals are requisite to understanding the notion of Third Persona, which seeks to acknowledge the unacknowledged social voice.

Public space, Wander states, is necessary for the perpetuation of healthy ideological criticism, without which "criticism lapses into eulogy or falls silent." At the heart of Wander's study is his consideration of the meaning of meaning in terms of semiotics: "If a critic denies that an action, event, or text meant something to those who produced it ... [then it] threatens to become meaningless." At the root of this problem of meaning is the intention of meaning and the intended audience to receive the intended meaning; Wander writes, "The 'meaning' of a speech will vary with the audience." Thus, interpretation varies significantly from the intended meaning of communication. Regarding audiences that are "not present, audiences rejected or negated through the speech and/or the speaking situation. This audience I shall call the Third Persona."

== Definitions ==
The third persona, according to Wander, is the audience negated or rejected by the speaker, speech, or situation. In each situation there is a speaker reaching an intended, "primary" audience, while also reaching an inadvertent, "secondary" audience. Wander's summation of his theory is succinct:

The Third Persona, therefore, refers to being negated. But "being negated" includes not only being alienated through language ... The objectification of certain individuals and groups discloses itself through what is and is not said about them and through actual conditions affecting their ability to speak for themselves ... negation extends beyond the "text" to include the ability to produce texts, to engage in discourse, to be heard in the public space.

The third persona is "the 'it' that is the summation of all that you and I are told to avoid becoming, but also being negated in history, a being whose presence, though relevant through what is said, is negated through silence" and "measured against an ideal." It is the audience that cannot assemble nor protest.

There is an ethical concern in the concept of third persona since it applies to groups who have been historically denied human rights, those prejudiced against due to their status as "non-subjects" based on age, citizenship, gender, sexual preference, race, or religion, for example. It applies to those individuals who have suffered from objectification by what is said against them, the level to which they are ignored, and those conditions which deny them an ability to speak for themselves within the rhetorical dialogue.

In Wander's example involving Heidegger and art in society, the primary audience are those within a society where questions elicit official answers, the secondary audience are ideologues and censors already accounted for, and the tertiary audience (i.e., third persona) "may or may not have been part of the speaker's awareness, existing in the silences of the text, the reality of oppression, and the unutterable experience of human suffering, an audience for whom what was said was relevant in ways that traditional approaches to interpretation may overlook."

== Theories of power ==
The concept of third persona is considered within the larger discussion of "rhetorical criticism" regarding speech communication, and also within the literature of the "ideological turn." Within rhetorical practice, critical rhetoric, ideological turn, and third persona are related to theories of power within social discourse and politics. In terms of power, the third persona is the audience ignored through discourse, or, as Wander writes, it is an implied rhetorical denouncement of an "unacceptable, undesirable, insignificant" audience.

Using rhetoric the critic wields power in a role as "the interpreter, the teacher, the social actor," the critiques of whom direct moral order within society. The third persona would be those whom these critiques disempower and silence through latent dismissal.

== Distinguished from marginalization ==
Marginalization is the being or being made socially marginal through a denial of power. Third persona can be distinguished from marginalization because the Third Persona is not only denied power and public voice, but is, at a basic level, denied consideration or recognition by those in power. While marginalization is an overt removal of power, the third persona suffers from an innate or unrecognized removal from power. Those persons who make up the body of the third persona may not be even considered to exist. Whereas the marginalized have a suppressed voice—a "marginal" voice—those of the third persona have no voice.

Conversely, others argue that third persona can be placed under the definition of marginalization—marginalized by those "hegemonic social and discursive structures" that accord them the status of "nonsubjects."

== Regarding the public sphere ==
The public sphere, as defined by Jürgen Habermas, consists of a social public that disregards status, holds a domain of common concern, and is publicly inclusive. Recent critiques, primarily by feminists such as Nancy Fraser, argue that Habermas' theory consisted of "significant exclusions," that his bourgeois public sphere excluded women and other unseen classes of persons.

Such criticisms, which seek to acknowledge forgotten populations, are sympathetic with Wander's conception of third persona. Where Fraser, et al., deviate from Wander is their assessment that these marginalized groups then form their own sub-spheres, termed counterpublics. The theory of third persona recognizes that despite the forming of sub-spheres or counterpublics, there are still groups that will fall outside even these marginalized groups, what might be thought of, in Fraserian terms, as nonpublics.

== Resolution versus acknowledgment ==
Some argue that it is not until those of the third persona enter into the sphere of the second persona that they will be heard and their interests attended to. For example, those who are seventeen years old will soon be old enough to vote and their unheard and unconsidered voice as part of the political Third Persona will automatically enter into the Second Persona once they are old enough to vote. Others, however, might argue that simply becoming part of the Second Persona does not solve the problem nor make the perpetual ranks of Third Persona disappear. A Third Persona will always be present in organized society and thus the problem cannot be solved; perhaps it needs to be foremost acknowledged.

Philip Wander suggests an emancipation from third persona through an ideological turn, or via criticism. As a theory the third persona "is a challenge, a rebel yell, of sorts, for critics and audiences to change criticism, to lay new groundwork for a system whose structure only serves to isolate itself from the social realm. Although derived from the social – the world of schoolchildren and politicians, most criticism is removed from its context through language and text and pondered irrespective of the people it affects or is affected by." Wander hopes to incite scholarly examination of the "rules for producing discourse (criticism) about discourse (rhetoric). Ideally, it should go beyond "claims of morality and the bonds of compassion;" "properly understood, it involves the unity of humanity and the wholeness of the human problem." In this light it shares similar interests within some social science fields for "radical change" scholarship.

== See also ==
- Jacques Derrida
- Sign (semiotics)
- Frankfurt School
