= Sandra Ball-Rokeach =

American sociologist

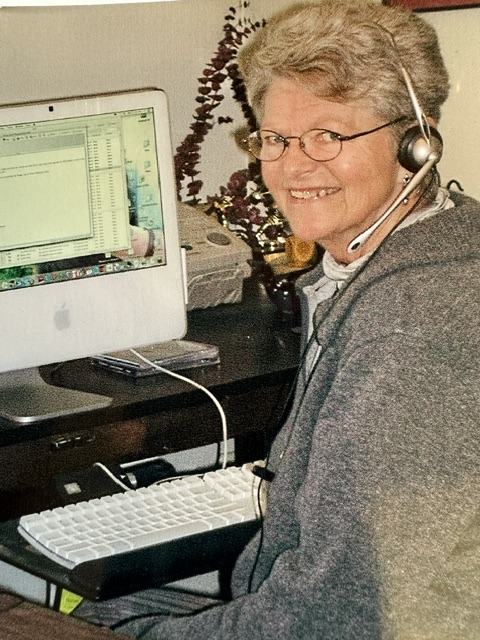
- Education: University of Washington
- Known for: Media system dependency theory
- Spouse: Milton Rokeach
- Children: 2
- Scientific career
- Workplaces: University of Alberta; Michigan State University; Washington State University; University of Southern California

Sandra J. Ball-Rokeach (born 1941) is an American sociologist and communications scholar. She is professor emerita at the USC Annenberg School for Communication and Journalism, and the department of sociology at the University of Southern California (USC).

Ball-Rokeach is best known for developing media system dependency theory with Melvin Defleur. In the later phase of her career, however, her research focus shifted toward the development of Communication Infrastructure Theory (CIT), which became a major area of her scholarly contribution. From the early 2000s onward, a substantial portion of her work was devoted to developing and applying CIT, particularly in relation to community communication networks, civic engagement, and the role of storytelling systems in shaping social integration.

== Life ==
Sandra Jean Ball was born in Ottawa, Canada in 1941. She gained a BA in sociology from the University of Washington in 1963, and her PhD in sociology there in 1968.

In 1967 Ball became an assistant professor at the University of Alberta. In 1968-69 she was co-director of a National Mass Media and Violence Task Force. In 1969 she married the social psychologist Milton Rokeach.

In 1970 Ball-Rokeach moved to Michigan State University, and in 1972 to Washington State University (WSU). She started the first gender studies program at WSU. In 1986 she moved to the University of Southern California, where she stayed until retirement.

She is a Fellow of the International Communication Association (ICA) and the Society for the Social Psychological Study of Social Issues (Division 9 of the American Psychological Association).

She served on the ICA Board and as a Chair of the Mass Communication Division. In 2024, She was included in the ICA series titled Architects of Communication. She was a Fulbright and Rockefeller Fellow. She co-edited Communication Research (with Charles Berger) from 1994 to 1999.

She served on the editorial board of several communication studies journals, including the Journal of Communication, Communication Studies and International Journal of Communication. Ball-Rokeach’s professional autobiography is told in the 2023 book, We Few We Academic Sisters: How We Preserved And Excelled in Higher Education edited by B. H. Winfield: Washington State University Press.

== Research and scholarly works ==
Ball-Rokeach and Melvin Defleur developed Media System Dependency (MSD) theory in 1976 as a comprehensive framework to explain how media influence individuals within broader social systems. Rooted in Sociology, the theory argues that media, audiences, and society are interdependent, and therefore media effects cannot be understood in isolation. At the core of MSD is the dependency hypothesis: the more individuals rely on media to fulfill their goals such as understanding the world, guiding actions, or escaping stress—the more influence media will have on their thoughts, feelings, and behaviors. This shifts the perspective from viewing audiences as passive receivers to seeing them as active participants whose level of dependence determines media impact.

She is known for her expertise in 21st-century urban communities, communication technologies, and civic engagement. As Principal Investigator of the Metamorphosis Project at University of Southern California, she has led long-term research exploring how communication processes shape everyday life in diverse, multiethnic urban settings.

Her work focuses on how traditional and new media including interpersonal networks, ethnic media, and digital platforms interact to create “storytelling neighborhoods,” which foster belonging, social cohesion, and civic participation within communities.

Her research expertise spans a wide range of interconnected areas, including communication technologies and community development, multiethnic media systems, immigrant communities and their media use, and patterns of daily life in geo-ethnic neighborhoods. She has also contributed to applied communication, particularly in designing media strategies for effective health campaigns and disaster preparedness, as well as studying families and children in culturally diverse urban environments. A key aspect of her scholarship is understanding how communication infrastructures influence inclusion, participation, and inequality in modern societies.

In addition to her theoretical contributions, Ball-Rokeach has an extensive body of scholarly publications and editorial work. She is co-author (with Melvin DeFleur) of the widely used textbook Theories of Mass Communication (5th ed., 1989) and co-author of The Great American Values Test (1984). She has also co-edited several influential volumes, including Technological Visions: The Hopes and Fears that Shape New Technologies (2004), Paradoxes of Youth and Sport (2002), and Media, Audience, and Social Structure (1986), which collectively examine the social implications of media, technology, and cultural change. Earlier in her career, she served as co-director of the Media and Violence Task Force for the National Commission on the Causes and Prevention of Violence (1968–69), reflecting her long-standing engagement with public policy and media effects.

Through decades of research, teaching, and leadership, Ball-Rokeach has helped shape the understanding of how communication systems operate within complex urban societies. Her work highlights the critical role of media and storytelling networks in connecting individuals to their communities, especially in an era defined by globalization, migration, and rapidly evolving communication technologies.

== Selected publications ==
=== Books ===
- Baker, R. K.; Ball, S. J., eds. (1969). Violence and the media A Report of the National Commission on the Causes and Prevention of Violence. U.S. Government Printing Office.
- Ball-Rokeach, S. J.; Rockeach, M.; Grube, J. W. (1984). The great American values test: Influencing behavior and belief through television. Free Press. p. 190. ISBN 9780029268506.
- Ball-Rokeach, S. J; Cantor, M. G, eds. (1986). Media, Audience, and Social Structure. Sage. p. 400. ISBN 978-0-8039-9771-4.
- DeFleur, Melvin Lawrence; Ball-Rokeach, Sandra (1989). Theories of Mass Communication (5th ed.). Longman. p. 368. ISBN 978-0-582-99870-4.
- Gatz, Margaret; Messner, Michael A.; Ball-Rokeach, Sandra J. (2002). Paradoxes of Youth and Sport. State University of New York Press. p. 294. ISBN 978-0-7914-8889-8.
- Sturken, Marita; Thomas, Douglas; Ball-Rokeach, Sandra (2004). Technological Visions: The Hopes and Fears that Shape New Technologies. Temple University Press. ISBN 978-1-59213-227-0.
- Matsaganis, Matthew; Katz, Vikki; Ball-Rokeach, Sandra (2011). Understanding Ethnic Media: Producers, Consumers, and Societies. 2455 Teller Road, Thousand Oaks California 91320 United States: SAGE Publications, Inc. p. 314. ISBN 978-1-4129-5913-1.

=== Selected articles ===
- Ball-Rokeach, S.J.; DeFleur, M.L. (1976). "A Dependency Model of Mass-Media Effects". Communication Research. 3 (1): 3–21. doi:10.1177/009365027600300101. ISSN 0093-6502.
- Ball-Rokeach, S. J (1985). "The Origins of Individual Media-System Dependency". Communication Research. 12 (4): 485–510. doi:10.1177/009365085012004003. ISSN 0093-6502.
- Ball-Rokeach, Sandra J. (1998). "A Theory of Media Power and a Theory of Media Use: Different Stories, Questions, and Ways of Thinking". Mass Communication and Society. 1 (1–2): 5–40. doi:10.1080/15205436.1998.9676398. ISSN 1520-5436.
- Ball-Rokeach, Sandra J.; KIM, Yong-Chan; Matei, Sorin (2001). "Storytelling Neighborhood". Communication Research. 28 (4): 392–428. doi:10.1177/009365001028004003. ISSN 0093-6502.
- Kim, Yong-Chan; Jung, Joo-Young; Ball-Rokeach, Sandra J. (2006). ""Geo-Ethnicity" and Neighborhood Engagement: A Communication Infrastructure Perspective". Political Communication. 23 (4): 421–441. doi:10.1080/10584600600976997. ISSN 1058-4609.
- Kim, Yong-Chan; Ball-Rokeach, Sandra J. (2006). "Community Storytelling Network, Neighborhood Context, and Civic Engagement: A Multilevel Approach". Human Communication Research. 32 (4): 411–439. doi:10.1111/j.1468-2958.2006.00282.x. ISSN 0360-3989.
- Kim, Yong-Chan; Ball-Rokeach, Sandra J. (2006). "Civic Engagement From a Communication Infrastructure Perspective". Communication Theory. 16 (2): 173–197. doi:10.1111/j.1468-2885.2006.00267.x. ISSN 1050-3293.
- Broad, Garrett M.; Ball-Rokeach, Sandra J.; Ognyanova, Katherine; Stokes, Benjamin; Picasso, Tania; Villanueva, George (2013). "Understanding Communication Ecologies to Bridge Communication Research and Community Action". Journal of Applied Communication Research. 41 (4): 325–345. doi:10.1080/00909882.2013.844848. ISSN 0090-9882.
- Son, Minhee; Ball-Rokeach, Sandra (2016), "The Whole Community Communication Infrastructure: The Case of Los Angeles", The Communication Crisis in America, And How to Fix It, New York: Palgrave Macmillan US, pp. 107–124, ISBN 978-1-349-94924-3
- Moran, Meghan Bridgid; Frank, Lauren B.; Zhao, Nan; Gonzalez, Carmen; Thainiyom, Prawit; Murphy, Sheila T.; Ball-Rokeach, Sandra J. (2016-01-20). "An Argument for Ecological Research and Intervention in Health Communication". Journal of Health Communication. 21 (2): 135–138. doi:10.1080/10810730.2015.1128021. ISSN 1081-0730. PMC 4944754.
- Moran, Meghan Bridgid; Frank, Lauren B.; Zhao, Nan; Gonzalez, Carmen; Thainiyom, Prawit; Murphy, Sheila T.; Ball-Rokeach, Sandra J. (2016). "An Argument for Ecological Research and Intervention in Health Communication". Journal of Health Communication. 21 (2): 135–138. doi:10.1080/10810730.2015.1128021. ISSN 1081-0730. PMC 4944754. PMID 26788682.
- Liu, Wenlin; Chen, Nien-Tsu Nancy; Ognyanova, Katherine; Nah, Seungahn; Ball-Rokeach, Sandra (2018). "Connecting With Hyperlocal News Website: Cause or Effect of Civic Participation?". American Behavioral Scientist. 62 (8): 1022–1041. doi:10.1177/0002764218764243. ISSN 0002-7642.
- Walter, Nathan; Ball-Rokeach, Sandra J.; Xu, Yu; Broad, Garrett M. (2018). "Communication Ecologies: Analyzing Adoption of False Beliefs in an Information-Rich Environment". Science Communication. 40 (5): 650–668. doi:10.1177/1075547018793427. ISSN 1075-5470.
- Chen, Nancy Nien-Tsu; Moran, Meghan B.; Frank, Lauren B.; Ball-Rokeach, Sandra J.; Murphy, Sheila T. (2018-07-03). "Understanding Cervical Cancer Screening among Latinas through the Lens of Structure, Culture, Psychology and Communication". Journal of Health Communication. 23 (7): 661–669. doi:10.1080/10810730.2018.1500661. ISSN 1081-0730. PMC 6326179.
- Burgess, Eleanor R.; Walter, Nathan; Ball-Rokeach, Sandra J.; Murphy, Sheila T. (2021-02-23). "Communication Hotspots: How Infrastructure Shapes People's Health". Health Communication. 36 (3): 361–371. doi:10.1080/10410236.2019.1692490. ISSN 1041-0236.
