= Strategic silence =

Strategic silence is a communication tactic and rhetorical practice involving the intentional withholding of speech. It is a calculated pause, a deliberate absence of verbal response employed to achieve a specific goal. Unlike simply being quiet, strategic silence is a conscious choice, a tool wielded with purpose. It can be an instrument in negotiations, debates, interpersonal relationships, and even broader social and political contexts. The effectiveness of strategic silence lies in its ambiguity. It can be interpreted in a multitude of ways, fostering uncertainty and prompting introspection in the other party. This ambiguity can be leveraged to gain an advantage, create space for reflection, or even exert pressure without uttering a single word.

== Motivations ==
The motivations behind strategic silence are varied. It can be used to signal disagreement or disapproval without direct confrontation, allowing a person to express their stance subtly. In negotiations, a carefully timed silence can create an opportunity for the other party to reconsider their position or offer concessions. It can also be used to gather information, allowing the other person to fill the void with more details or reveal their true intentions. Silence can also be a tool for emotional regulation, providing a moment to process information and formulate a thoughtful response rather than reacting impulsively. In some cultures, silence is valued as a sign of respect and attentiveness, a way of demonstrating careful consideration before speaking. This cultural context further complicates the interpretation of strategic silence, adding layers of meaning beyond the spoken word.

Beyond interpersonal interactions, strategic silence finds application in various professional settings. In crisis communication, companies might strategically remain silent for a period to assess the situation and formulate a cohesive response, avoiding premature or ill-informed statements that could exacerbate the crisis. This calculated silence allows for information gathering and strategic planning before addressing the public. Similarly, employees may employ strategic silence in workplace situations, for example to avoid being drawn into office gossip, to signal disagreement with a proposed course of action without directly challenging their superiors, or to allow a colleague to take the lead in a presentation. This can be a delicate balancing act, as the line between strategic silence and disengagement can be thin.

However, strategic silence is not without risks. It can be misconstrued as indifference, arrogance, or even hostility. In situations where communication is crucial, prolonged silence can exacerbate misunderstandings and create further barriers. The effectiveness of strategic silence depends heavily on the context, the relationship between the parties involved, and the cultural norms at play. What might be perceived as a powerful move in one situation could be completely ineffective or even counterproductive in another. Therefore, the decision to employ strategic silence requires careful consideration and a nuanced understanding of the dynamics of the interaction.
