= Situational crisis communication theory =

Emergency management theory

Situational Crisis Communication Theory (SCCT), is a theory in the field of crisis communication. It suggests that crisis managers should match strategic crisis responses to the level of crisis responsibility and reputational threat posed by a crisis. SCCT was proposed by W. Timothy Coombs in 2007.

According to SCCT, evaluating the crisis type, crisis history and prior relationship reputation will help crisis managers predict the level of reputational threat of an organization and how that organization's publics will perceive the crisis and attribute crisis responsibility. Thus SCCT can be applied in an organization's crisis management.

Three types of crises have been identified by Coombs: the victim cluster, the accidental cluster, and the intentional cluster.

Coombs created his experimentally based SCCT to give communicators scientific evidence to guide their decisions, essentially stating that the actions an organization takes post-crisis depend on the crisis situation. "SCCT identifies how key facets of the crisis situation influence attributions about the crisis and the reputations held by stakeholders. In turn, understanding how stakeholders will respond to the crisis informs the post-crisis communication".

Coombs would later expand his work with SCCT through reflections of meta-analysis.

== SCCT crisis response strategy guidelines ==
With empirical evidence to support his theory, Coombs provided a summary of crisis response strategy guidelines for crisis managers, given here in Table 1. SCCT provides crisis managers with an evidence-based guide to assessing and responding to crises, allowing them to make informed, strategic, and beneficial decisions.

Table 1: SCCT crisis response strategy guidelines
1. Informing and adjusting information alone can be enough when crises have minimal attributions of crisis responsibility (victim crises), no history of similar crises and a neutral or positive prior relationship reputation.
2. Victimage can be used as part of the response for workplace violence, product tampering, natural disasters and rumors.
3. Diminish crisis response strategies should be used for crises with minimal attributions of crisis responsibility (victim crises) coupled with a history of similar crises and/or negative prior relationship reputation.
4. Diminish crisis response strategies should be used for crises with low attributions of crisis responsibility (accident crises), which have no history of similar crises, and a neutral or positive prior relationship reputation.
5. Rebuild crisis response strategies should be used for crises with low attributions of crisis responsibility (accident crises), coupled with a history of similar crises and/or negative prior relationship reputation.
6. Rebuild crisis response strategies should be used for crises with strong attributions of crisis responsibility (preventable crises) regardless of crisis history or prior relationship reputation.
7. The deny posture crisis response strategies should be used for rumor and challenge crises, when possible.
8. Maintain consistency in crisis response strategies. Mixing deny crisis response strategies with either the diminish or rebuild strategies will erode the effectiveness of the overall response.
Source: Coombs, W.T. (2007b). Protecting organization reputations during a crisis: The development and application of situational crisis communication theory. Corporate Reputation Review, 10(3), 163-176.

== Theoretical framework ==
The roots for SCCT can be found in Attribution Theory. It provided one of the first links between crisis situations and crisis responses. Attributions of responsibility that shape strategic crisis responses formed the foundation for SCCT. Coombs built upon Attribution Theory, using it as a base to predict the severity of potential reputational harm—or reputational threat—a crisis may bring to an organization and, using that prediction, guide communication response decisions to minimize damage.

Coombs draws on William Benoit's Image Restoration Theory in his conceptualization of responsibility and reputational threat, stating that perception is fundamental to assessments of both components. If the audience perceives that the organization is at fault, a reputational threat is put into existence and the organization is held responsible.

== Crisis responsibility and reputational threat ==
SCCT suggests that the key to determining the most effective strategic crisis response is understanding the crisis situation and the amount of reputational threat being posed by the crisis. Reputational threat is how much damage a crisis could inflict on an organization if no action is taken to respond to it. Reputational threat is influenced by three elements: (1) initial crisis responsibility, (2) crisis history and (3) prior relational reputation.

Initial crisis responsibility is how much the organization's stakeholders attribute the crisis to the organization; how responsible the key publics hold the organization itself for the crisis. In assessing the level of reputational threat facing an organization, crisis managers must first determine the type of crisis facing the organization.

== Types of crises ==
Coombs has identified three "crisis clusters," or types of crises, in his SCCT research: the victim cluster, the accidental cluster, and the intentional cluster. Table 2 outlines these crisis clusters.

In the victim cluster, the organization is not attributed as the cause of the crisis; rather, the organization is viewed as a victim. In the accidental cluster, the organization has been nominally attributed as the cause of the crisis, but the situation is generally viewed by stakeholders as being unintentional or simply accidental. In the intentional cluster, the organization is given all or most of the attributions for the crisis and shoulders the responsibility. In this case the crisis is considered deliberate.

One example where SCCT was used was the lockout that began within the National Hockey League in September 2012.

Table 2: SCCT crisis types by crisis clusters
Victim cluster: In these crisis types, the organization is also a victim of the crisis.
(Weak attributions of crisis responsibility = Mild reputational threat)
Natural disaster: Acts of nature damage an organization such as an earthquake.
Rumor: False and damaging information about an organization is being circulated.
Workplace violence: Current or former employee attacks current employees onsite.
Product tampering/Malevolence: External agent causes damage to an organization.

Accidental cluster: In these crisis types, the organizational actions leading to the crisis were unintentional.
(Minimal attributions of crisis responsibility = Moderate reputational threat)
Challenges: Stakeholders claim an organization is operating in an inappropriate manner.
Technical-error accidents: A technology or equipment failure causes an industrial accident.
Technical-error product harm: A technology or equipment failure causes a product to be recalled.

Intentional cluster: In these crisis types, the organization knowingly placed people at risk, took inappropriate actions or violated a law/regulation.
(Strong attributions of crisis responsibility = Severe reputational threat)
Human error accidents: Human error causes an industrial accident.
Human-error product harm: Human error causes a product to be recalled.
Organizational misdeed with no injuries: Stakeholders are deceived without injury.
Organizational misdeed management misconduct: Laws or regulations are violated by management.
Organizational misdeed with injuries: Stakeholders are placed at risk by management and injuries occur.
'Source: Coombs, W.T. (2007b).

Once it is determined which type of crisis, or which cluster, the organization's situation falls under, managers can predict how much attribution will be placed on the organization and how much reputational threat it is facing. In fact, Coombs’ own prior research showed that crisis responsibility and organizational reputation are negatively related.

== Crisis history and relational reputation ==
Another element that threatens an organization's reputation is its history of crisis, whether it has faced similar crises in the past. Within this context, how well an organization has treated its stakeholders in the past—its prior relational reputation—also plays a part in assessing reputational threat. These two elements are involved in the second step crisis managers must take in evaluating the reputational threat facing the organization: if either of these elements exist within the organization, it will intensify attributions of the organization and increase the level of reputational threat. If an organization has a history of facing crises or a poor history of dealing with its stakeholders, attributions of crisis responsibility and the level of reputational threat are greater.

Because of crisis responsibility and reputational threat, crises can effect changes in emotions, and as a result, behaviors. If a person perceives an organization to have a high level of crisis responsibility, he or she is more likely to have feelings of anger toward the organization. Conversely, lower levels of crisis responsibility can evoke feelings of sympathy. Both of these feelings can affect the behaviors of the person toward the organization, whether that person will act positively or negatively toward the organization.

== Crisis response strategies ==
Once the levels of crisis responsibility and reputational threat have been determined, SCCT provides crisis managers with a theoretical base to their strategic crisis response. SCCT's list for responding to crises assumes that the organization has accepted some level of responsibility for the crisis. Coombs found that the primary responses to crises in SCCT form three groups: deny, diminish, and rebuild. The SCCT list of crisis response strategies is shown in Table 3.

Each of these strategies helps the organization get its side of the story into the media. After all how the crisis is framed in the media will determine how the organization's publics view the situation. The media's frames become the stakeholders’ frames.

- The deny strategies help establish a crisis frame and sever any perceived connection between the organization and the crisis. If the organization is not involved, or if the crisis is a rumor the organization can dispel, and stakeholders and the media accept that there is no crisis, no reputational harm will be done.
- Diminish crisis responses attempt to assure the organization's publics that the crisis is not as bad as it seems or that the organization had nothing to do with the situation. These strategies help lessen the connection between the organization and the crisis and help the organization's publics see the crisis in a less negative light. However, these strategies must be reinforced with credible evidence. If conflicting crisis frames are presented in the media, the organization's publics will adopt whichever frame comes from the most credible source.
- Rebuild strategies help change perceptions of an organization during a crisis by offering real or symbolic forms of aid to victims and asking their forgiveness. These strategies attempt to take the focus off the crisis by taking positive action.

A secondary type of responses, bolstering, attempts to increase positive reputational perceptions by presenting "new, positive information about the organization and/or remind[ing] stakeholders of past good works by the organization". This strategy can bolster goodwill and arouse feelings of sympathy toward the organization, but Coombs warns, should be used to supplement the primary responses, not as replacements.

Table 3: SCCT crisis response strategies
Primary crisis response strategies
Deny crisis response strategies
Attack the accuser: Crisis manager confronts the person or group claiming something is wrong with the organization.
Denial: Crisis manager asserts that there is no crisis.
Scapegoat: Crisis manager blames some person or group outside of the organization for the crisis.
Diminish crisis response strategies
Excuse: Crisis manager minimizes organizational responsibility by denying intent to do harm and/or claiming inability to control the events that triggered the crisis.
Justification: Crisis manager minimizes the perceived damage caused by the crisis.
Rebuild crisis response strategies
Compensation: Crisis manager offers money or other gifts to victims.
Apology: Crisis manager indicates the organization takes full responsibility for the crisis and asks stakeholders for forgiveness.

Secondary crisis response strategies
Bolstering crisis response strategies
Reminder: Tell stakeholders about the past good works of the organization.
Ingratiation: Crisis manager praises stakeholders and/or reminds them of past good works by the organization.
Victimage: Crisis managers remind stakeholders that the organization is a victim of the crisis too.
Source: Coombs, W.T. (2007b).

SCCT suggests that how an organization communicates with its publics—what it says—will affect its publics’ perceptions of the organization. Those perceptions can shape how an organization's publics emotionally react to or behave toward to the organization. Therefore, the communication decisions crisis managers make in the wake of a crisis could have great consequences, either positive or negative. It is imperative that crisis managers act strategically to save the organization's reputation. According to Coombs: "Crisis response strategies have three objectives relative to protecting reputations: (1) shape attributions of the crisis, (2) change perceptions of the organization in crisis and (3) reduce the negative effect generated by the crisis."

Coombs' research of situational crisis communication theory has focused on crisis response and the effect of the corporate reputation but never on the nonprofit organization standpoint. While these two industries operate differently, both still need their crisis situations properly addressed and in a timely manner. Not only building, but maintaining trust and reputation is essential in both types of organizations. Nonprofits depend on their publics and are often held on a higher pedestal than the average for-profit organization and are always being shaped by the wants and needs of their external environments. These matters make nonprofits vulnerable to crisis' so having a strategy and being ready to implement is mandatory. Research done by Hilary Fussell Sisco in 2012 found that participants favor nonprofits more positively that utilize a response strategy from Coombs.

== Sources ==
- Broom, G. M. (2009). Cutlip & Center's Effective Public Relations. (10 ed.). Upper Saddle River, NJ: Prentice Hall.
- Claeys, An-Sofie; Cauberghe, Verolien (March 2012). "Crisis response and crisis timing strategies, two sides of the same coin". Public Relations Review. 38 (1): 83–88. doi:10.1016/j.pubrev.2011.09.001.
- Coombs, W. T. (1 July 2004). "Impact of Past Crises on Current Crisis Communication: Insights From Situational Crisis Communication Theory". Journal of Business Communication. 41 (3): 265–289. doi:10.1177/0021943604265607. hdl:10818/19239. S2CID 154326081.
- Coombs, W. T. (2007a). Crisis management and communications. Retrieved March 20, 2012 from http://www.instituteforpr.org/topics/crisis-management-and-communications/.
- Coombs, W Timothy (September 2007). "Protecting Organization Reputations During a Crisis: The Development and Application of Situational Crisis Communication Theory". Corporate Reputation Review. 10 (3): 163–176. doi:10.1057/palgrave.crr.1550049. S2CID 167311536.
- Coombs, W. Timothy; Holladay, Sherry J. (October 1996). "Communication and Attributions in a Crisis: An Experimental Study in Crisis Communication". Journal of Public Relations Research. 8 (4): 279–295. doi:10.1207/s1532754xjprr0804_04.
- Coombs, W. Timothy; Holladay, Sherry (1 October 2001). "An Extended Examination of the Crisis Situations: A Fusion of the Relational Management and Symbolic Approaches". Journal of Public Relations Research. 13 (4): 321–340. doi:10.1207/S1532754XJPRR1304_03. S2CID 143601768.
- Fearn-Banks, K. (2007). Crisis communication: A casebook approach. (3 ed.). Mahwah, New Jersey: Lawrence Erlbaum Associates, Inc.
- Ide, B; Martin, SH; Totten, M (July 2011). "Crisis management and maintaining the public trust". Trustee. 64 (7): 15–8. PMID 21870695.
- Kelley, Harold H.; Michela, John L. (January 1980). "Attribution Theory and Research". Annual Review of Psychology. 31 (1): 457–501. doi:10.1146/annurev.ps.31.020180.002325. PMID 20809783. S2CID 15258190.
- Wilcox, D. L., Cameron, G. T., Reber, B. H., & Shin, J. (2011). Think: Public relations. (1 ed.). Boston: Allyn & Bacon.
