= Central States Communication Association =

- Current CSCA logo
- Formation: 1931
- Headquarters: Western Michigan University
- Members: 900
- Website: www.csca-net.org

The Central States Communication Association (CSCA) is a professional, academic organization of university professors, communication professionals, and primary and secondary school teachers. CSCA was founded in 1931 to promote the communications discipline in educational, scholarly, and professional endeavors. The Association covers the 13 Midwestern states of North Dakota, South Dakota, Nebraska, Kansas, Oklahoma, Missouri, Illinois, Iowa, Wisconsin, Minnesota, Michigan, Indiana, and Ohio. CSCA has 24 Interest Groups, Caucuses, and Sections that promote particular communication areas.

The association hosts a yearly convention within the 13 states, and publishes two peer reviewed academic journals, Communication Studies and the Journal of Communication Pedagogy. The former covers communication processes, specifically communication theory and research, in five issues a year. The latter was established in 2018 and covers the pedagogy of teaching K-12, undergraduate, and graduate communication, and is an annual online-only journal.

== See also ==
- International Communication Association
- National Communication Association
