= Image restoration theory =

Theory in crisis communication

Introduced by William Benoit, image restoration theory (also known as image repair theory) outlines strategies that can be used to restore one's image in an event where reputation has been damaged. Image restoration theory can be applied as an approach for understanding both personal and organizational crisis situations. It is a component of crisis communication, which is a sub-specialty of public relations. Its purpose is to protect an individual, company, or organization facing a public challenge to its reputation.

Benoit outlines this theory in Accounts, Excuses, and Apologies: A Theory of Image Restoration Strategies.

== Basic concepts ==
Two components must be present in a given attack to the image of an individual or organization:

1. The accused is held responsible for an action.
2. the act is considered offensive.

Image restoration theory is grounded in two fundamental assumptions.

1. Communication is a goal-directed activity. Communicators may have multiple goals that are not collectively compatible, but people try to achieve goals that are most important to them at the time, with reasonable cost.
2. Maintaining a favorable reputation is a key goal of communication. Because face, image, or reputation is valued as important, individuals or organizations are motivated to take action when it is compromised.

Perception is fundamental to image restoration, as the accused actor will not engage in a defensive strategy unless the perception exists that he is at fault. The actor who committed the wrongful act must decide on the strategy of the best course based on their specific situation. Factors such as credibility, audience perceptions, and the degree of offensiveness of the act must be taken into account.

Some image repair factors include

1. Crisis responsibility – how much a company or person is responsible for in a crisis
2. Crisis type – what type of crisis is happening
3. Organizational reputation – what is the known reputation and behavior of a company or a person

== Theoretical framework ==
The importance of image is one of the key factors in a brand, or persons, business. This is one of the most important factors when it comes to conflict management and resolution. The theory of image restoration builds upon theories of apologia and accounts. Apologia is a formal defense or justification of an individual's opinion, position, or actions, and an account is a statement made by an individual or organization to explain unanticipated or transgressive events.

Benoit claims that these treatments of image restoration focus on identifying options rather than prescribing solutions. He grounds image restoration theory on a comprehensive literature review of apologia and accounts theories.

Specific influences of image restoration theory include Rosenfield's (1968) theory of analog, Ware and Linkugel's (1973) theory of apologia; Kenneth Burke's (1970) theory of goals and purification; Ryan's (1982) kategoria and apologia; Scott and Lyman's (1968) analysis of accounts; Goffman's (1967) remedial moves; Schonbach's (1980) updated analysis of Scott and Lyman's (1968) theory; and Schlenker's (1980) analysis of impression management and accounts.

== Typology of strategies ==
Strategy	Explanation
Denial	The accused may simply deny that the act occurred, or shift the blame to the 'real' culprit.
Evading responsibility	When unable to deny performing the act in question, the accused may attempt to evade responsibility. This strategy has four components.: Provocation: the actor may claim that the act was committed in response to another wrongful act.; Defeasibility: the actor pleads a lack of knowledge or control over important factors related to the offensive act.; Unaccountability: the actor may make an excuse for factors beyond their control.; Bona fide: the actor asks not to be held fully responsible based on their good, rather than evil motives in committing the act.
Reducing offensiveness	The accused may attempt to reduce the degree of negative feeling experienced by the audience. This strategy has six components.: Bolstering: used to mitigate the negative effects by reinforcing the audience's positive idea of the accused. They may remind the audience of prior good acts.; Minimization: attempts to convince the audience that the act in question is less serious than it appears.; Differentiation: the act is distinguished from other, more offensive acts in order to lessen the audience's negative sentiment by means of comparison.; Transcendence: the act is placed in a broad context to place it in a different, less offensive frame of reference.; Ad hominem: the actor attacks their accusers or questions the credibility of the sources of the accusations.; Compensation: the actor offers to redress the victims of their action in order to offset the negative sentiment that is being held against them.
Corrective action	The accused claims that they will correct the problem. This can involve restoring the situation to its prior state, or promising to make changes to prevent its reoccurrence.
Mortification	The accused admits responsibility and asks for forgiveness.

== Case studies ==
=== Case studies by Benoit ===
Based on several case studies by Benoit and his colleagues, a number of prescriptive recommendations were cited for the use of crisis strategies:

1. The dominant recommendation is for an organization to immediately admit fault/accept responsibility.
2. Corrective actions should be taken and an organization need to publicize those actions.
3. Bolstering, which is directly related to the charge, is the most effective strategy.
4. If the organization is innocent, denial is an effective strategy.

"Image restoration theory is the dominant line of research generating these recommendations. The most common recommendations suggest using the mortification and corrective action crisis response when an organization is guilty."

In the table below, representative case studies by Benoit and his colleagues are introduced:

Category	Subjects	Summary of crisis	Strategies	Practices	Authors (year)
Individual	Queen Elizabeth	The sudden death of Princess Diana	Denial, Bolstering, Defeasibility, Transcendence	Unprecedented speech of the Queen	Benoit & Brinson (1999)
Individual	Hugh Grant	Being arrested in Hollywood for lewd behavior with a prostitute	Mortification, Bolstering, Ad hominem, Denial	Appeared on "The Tonight Show," "Larry King Live," "The Today Shaw," "Live with Regis and Kathie Lee," and "The Late Show"	Benoit (1997)
Individual	Tonya Harding	The involvement in the attack on her teammate and rival, Nancy Kerrigan	Bolstering, Denial, Ad hominem	Interview in the program Eye-to-Eye with Connie Chung	Benoit & Hanczor (1994)
Organizational	AT&T	The long-distance breakdown in 1991, followed by governmental investigation	Mortification, Corrective action, Bolstering	Misguided attempt to blame lower-level workers Robert Allen (chairman) published a full-page newspaper advertisement	Benoit & Brinson (1994)
Organizational	USAir	The crash of an aircraft in Pittsburgh in 1994	Bolstering, Denial, Corrective action	Media coverage	Benoit & Czerwinski (1997)
Organizational	Dow Corning	The safety issue of its silicone breast implants	Denial, Evading responsibility, (Promising) Corrective action	Simply denied and making a conflict with FDA	Brinson & Benoit (1996)
Organizational	Texaco	The racism issue in a secret tape of an executive meeting referred to African-Americans as "black jelly beans"	Bolstering, Corrective action, Mortification, Shifting the blame (to a subgroup of employees characterized as "bad apples").	Peter Bijur (chair) disseminated six messages	Brinson & Benoit (1999)

=== Limitation of Image repair theory – Coombs ===
Even though image restoration theory represented the use of mortification (accepting responsibility) and corrective action, there might be alternative recommendations. For instance, his studies using situational crisis communication theory found no support for always using mortification and corrective action. Also, the mortification and corrective action strategies had no greater effect than a simple bolstering strategy in a criminal violation crisis such as racial discrimination (Coombs, 2006). This theory can not be predicted.

Additionally, in terms of the limitation of case studies in image restoration theory, Coombs argued that closer scrutiny with insights should be taken before offering strategies to crisis managers as facts. To gain additional insights into the use of crisis responses, he pointed out many similar crises should be examined for patterns of strategy use and effect, and "a large number of cases could be coded and subjected to log-linear analysis to identify patterns." (Coombs, 2006, p. 191-192)

=== The Cola Wars ===
Coca-Cola and Pepsi's longstanding competition reached its peak when Coke and Pepsi placed advertisements in Nation's Restaurant News with unmistakable attacks from both sides.

Benoit analyses advertisements from both companies from 1990–1992 to address the persuasive strategies of Coke and Pepsi to determine recommendations for image restoration following an attack. He advises that companies should avoid making false claims, provide adequate support for claims, and develop themes throughout a campaign, and avoid arguments that might backfire.

== See also ==
- Reputation management
