= Melvin Defleur =

American academic (1923–2017)

Melvin Lawrence DeFleur (April 27, 1923 – February 13, 2017) was a professor and scholar in the field of communications. His initial field of study was social sciences.

== Biography ==
Melvin Lawrence DeFleur was born in Portland, Oregon on April 27, 1923. DeFleur received his Ph.D. in social psychology from the University of Washington in 1954. His thesis, Experimental studies of stimulus response relationships in leaflet communication, drew from sociology, psychology, and communication, to study how information diffused through American communities.

He has taught at Indiana University (1954–1963), the University of Kentucky (1963–1967), Washington State University (1967–1976), the University of New Mexico (1976–1980), the University of Miami (1981–1985), Syracuse University (1987–1994) and the University of Washington before taking his last position as professor of communication at Boston University's Department of Mass Communication, Advertising and Public Relations. In addition, he was a Fulbright Professor to Argentina twice: and was affiliated with the Argentine Sociological Society and the Ibero-Interamerican Sociological Society, for which he served as secretary general.

DeFleur was married to Margaret DeFleur, Associate Dean for Graduate Studies and Research.

DeFleur died on February 13, 2017, aged 93.

== Academic work ==
His early work owes a debt to Stuart C. Dodd and George A. Lundberg, sociologists and psychologists. This group applied quantitative measure, statistical data analyses, and descriptive mathematical models used in the physical sciences to the development of sociology.

Another force affected his work: He began his career when the memories of World War II were fresh, and entered into the academic world when the Cold War played a critical role in shaping the United States' political, economic and social atmosphere. Social psychology research added to the knowledge that the United States government and military felt they needed for operating in a new world dynamic (East v. West). For example, the leafleting processes studied by Project Revere were an obvious way to communicate information to a displaced, captive, or isolated population.

He maintained a sociological focus during the early 1970s, co-writing an introductory sociology textbook that went into several editions. He co-authored a study of discrimination in university hiring practices, particularly in sociology departments (Wolfe et al., 1973), again with a strong emphasis on statistics and survey methods. However, his focus shifted. With the spread of television, he began to study the mass media. Specifically, he researched the effect of television on children's knowledge of occupational roles, and on the factors that influence the content and output of the American broadcasting systems. He and others established a formal definition of social expectations theory, applied to a model to predict that watching television attunes a viewer to social organization patterns of various groups, even if they "have never been members or never will be". Other works examined the potential relationships forged by mass media between the perception of social problems and their portrayal by the media. He wrote of his suggestion of a cultural norms theory in 1970, an idea that, in his estimation, "provided the foundation for the more comprehensive social expectations theory".

In the 1970s and 1980s he continued studies on news diffusion. In reviewing some major studies (DeFleur, 1988), he found that despite emerging technology, word of mouth is still important, and major events that concern a broader population will travel further and faster. His research lead to the creation of the Media Systems Dependency Theory with Sandra Ball-Rokeach in 1976.

DeFleur cites his idea (formed with Timothy Plax) of the language-shaping function of the media as one of four theories on how media shape messages, and what that means for social conduct (DeFleur & Ball-Rokeach, 1989). The other three are the meaning-construction function of the press; cultivation theory; the agenda setting function of the press. His transition from "pure" social psychology to mass communication mirrors the growth of this field. His theories, are widely cited in mass communication studies and in general theoretical surveys.

He is on the executive board of the Center for Global Media Studies at Washington State University, an organization whose motto, "Global Media Cover the World ... We Cover Global Media," connects with the focus of his recent work studying the accuracy of audience recall of news media in a cross-cultural vein (Faccoro & DeFleur, 1993).

== Selected bibliography ==
Dennis, E. E. & DeFleur, M. L. (2010). Understanding Media in the Digital Age. Allyn & Bacon.

- DeFleur, M. L. (1983). Social Problems in American Society. Prentice Hall.
- DeFleur, M. L. (1987). The growth and decline of research on the diffusion of the news: 1945–1985. Communication Research, 14(1),109-130.
- DeFleur, M. L. (1988). Diffusing information. Society, 2, 72–81.
- DeFleur, M. L. & Ball-Rokeach, S. (1989). Theories of mass communication (5th ed.). White Plains, NY: Longman.
- DeFleur, M. L. & Cronin, M. M. (1991). Completeness and accuracy of recall in the diffusion of the news from a newspaper vs a television source. Sociological Inquiry, 61(2), 148–166.
- DeFleur, M. L. & Dennis, E. (1998). Understanding mass communication. (6th ed.). Boston: Houghton Mifflin.
- DeFleur, M. L. et al. (1992). Audience recall of news stories presented by newspaper, computer, television and radio. Journalism Quarterly, 69: 1010–1022.
- DeFleur, M. L., Kearney, P. & Plax, T. G. (1993). Mastering communication in contemporary America: Theory, research, and practice. Mountain View, CA: Mayfield Publishing Company.
- DeFleur, M. L., Kearney, P. & Plax, T. G. (1997). Fundamentals of Human Communication. (2nd ed.). Mountain View, CA: Mayfield Publishing.
- DeFleur, M. L. & Larsen, O. N. (1987). The flow of communication. (2nd ed.). New Brunswick, NJ: Transaction, Inc. (Original work published 1958).
- DeFleur, M. L. & Plax, T. G. (1980). Human Communication as a Bio-Social Process. Paper presented to the International Communication Association, Acapulco, Mexico.
- DeFleur, M. L. & Westie, F. (December 1958) Verbal attitudes and overt acts: An experiment on the salience of attitudes. American Sociological Review, 12 (6).
- Faccoro, L. B. & DeFleur, M. L. (1993). A cross-cultural experiment on how well audiences remember news stories from newspaper, computer, television, and radio sources. Journalism Quarterly, 70, 585–601.
- Hawkins, R. P. et al. Advancing communication science- Merging mass and interpersonal processes. Sociological Inquiry, 60, 434–437.
- Hubbard, J. C., DeFleur, M. L. & DeFleur, L. B. (1975). Mass media influences on public conceptions of social problems. Social Problems, 23(1), 22–34.
- Lowery, S. A. & DeFleur, M. L. (1995). Milestones in mass communication research: Media effects. (3rd edition). White Plains, NY: Longman.
- Wolfe, J. C., DeFleur, M. L. & Slocum, W. L. (1973). Sex discrimination in hiring practices of graduate sociology departments: Myths and realities. American Sociologist, 8(4), 159–164.
