= Media system dependency theory =

1976 theory developed by Sandra Ball-Rokeach and Melvin Defleur

Ball-Rokeach & DeFleur's (1976) MSD conceptual model

Media system dependency theory (MSD), or simply media dependency, was developed by Sandra Ball-Rokeach and Melvin Defleur in 1976. The theory is grounded in classical sociological literature positing that media and their audiences should be studied in the context of larger social systems.

MSD ties together the interrelations of broad social systems, mass media, and the individual into a comprehensive explanation of media effects. At its core, the basic dependency hypothesis states that the more a person depends on media to meet needs, the more important media will be in a person's life, and therefore the more effects media will have on a person.

== The relationships between components ==
Dependency on media emerges from three relationships.

1. The relationship between the society and the media: Within this relationship, media access and availability are regarded as important antecedents to an individual's experience with the media. The nature of media dependence on societal systems varies across political, economic, and cultural system.
2. The relationship between the media and the audience: This relationship is the key variable in this theory because it affects how people might use a mass medium. This relationship also varies across media systems. The more salient the information needs, the stronger are the motivation to seek mediated information and the dependency on the medium. As a result, the likelihood that the media will affect audiences increases.
3. The relationship between the society and the audience: The societies influence consumers' needs and motives for media use, and provide norms, values, knowledge, and laws for their members. Social system can function an alternatives to the media by offering similar services of the media.

== Media needs and media dependency ==
=== Three types of needs ===
According to Ball-Rokeach and DeFleur, three media needs determine how important media is to a person at any given moment:

1. The need to understand one's social world (surveillance)
2. The need to act meaningfully and effectively in that world (social utility)
3. The need to escape from that world when tensions are high (fantasy-escape)

When these needs for media are high, the more people turn to media to meet these needs, and therefore the media have a greater opportunity to affect them. That said, none of these media needs are constant over long periods of time. They change based on aspects of our social environment.

=== Two basic conditions for heightened media needs ===
Media dependency theory posits two specific conditions under which people's media needs, and consequently their dependence on media and the potential for media effects, are heightened.

The first condition of heightened media needs occurs when the number of media and the centrality of media functions in a society are high. For instance, in modernized countries like the United States, there are many media outlets and they serve highly centralized social functions. In the United States alone, the media act as a "fourth branch" of government, an alarm system during national emergencies, and as a tool for entertainment and escape, whereas in the underdeveloped world the media are not as numerous and serve far fewer functions. As such, the media have a greater opportunity to serve needs and exert effects in contemporary America than in a third world country.

The second condition of heightened media needs occurs when a society is undergoing social change and conflict. When there is a war or large-scale public protests like during Vietnam or the Arab Spring, a national emergency like the terrorist attacks of September 11, 2001, or a natural disaster like Hurricane Katrina, people turn to media to help understand these important events. Consequently, the media have a greater opportunity to exert effects during these times of social change and conflict.

== The effects of media message ==
Ball-Rokeach and DeFleur suggests that the cognitive, behavioral and affective consequences of media use are premised upon characteristics of both individuals and their social environment.

=== Cognitive ===
There are five types of cognitive effects that will be exerted on audiences, the first of which is the creation and resolution of ambiguity. Ambiguity occurs when audiences receive inadequate or incomplete information about their social world. When there is high ambiguity, stress is created, and audiences are more likely to turn to mass media to resolve ambiguity. Ambiguity might be especially prevalent during times of social change or conflict.

The second effect is agenda-setting. This is another reason why we might call dependency a "comprehensive" theory of media effects – it incorporates the entire theory of agenda-setting within its theoretical framework. Like any other effect, media agenda-setting effects should be heightened during times when the audience's needs and, therefore, dependency on media are high. So, for instance, if our informational needs and dependency on media was high during the invasion of Iraq in 2003, we would have been more susceptible to agenda-setting effects, and we would have therefore perceived the Iraq War as the most important problem (MIP) facing the United States.

Third is attitude formation. Media exposes us to completely new people, such as political figures and celebrities, not to mention physical objects like birth control pills or car safety mechanisms that we come to form attitudes about. Dependency does not suggest media are monolithic in their ability to influence attitudes, but the theory does suggest that media play a role in selecting objects and people for which people form attitudes about. If a person is experiencing greater media dependency, we would therefore expect that the person will form more (or more complex) attitudes about these attitude-objects than people with low media dependency.

Media also have the potential cognitive effect of expanding people's belief systems. Media can create a kind of "enlargement" of citizen's beliefs by disseminating information about other people, places, and things. Expansion of people's belief systems refers to a broadening or enlarging of beliefs in a certain category. For example, a constant flow of information about global warming will expand people's beliefs about pollution affecting the Earth's atmosphere, about cap and trade and other policies, and about personal contributions to global warming. These beliefs meet with and are incorporated into an existing value system regarding religion, free enterprise, work, ecology, patriotism, recreation, and the family.

Last is value clarification and conflict. Media help citizens clarify values (equality, freedom, honesty, forgiveness) often by precipitating information about value conflicts. For instance, during the 1960s the mass media regularly reported on the activities of the Civil Rights Movement, presenting conflicts between individual freedoms (e.g., a businessman's property rights to deny blacks entrance) and equality (e.g., human rights). When such conflicts play out in the mass media, the value conflicts are identified, resulting in audiences forming their own value positions. Such a position can be painful to articulate because it forces a choice between mutually incompatible goals and the means to obtain them. However, in the process of trying to decide which is more important in a particular case, general value priorities can become clarified.

=== Affective ===
Ball-Rokeach and DeFleur mentions several possible affective media effects that are more likely to occur during times of heightened dependency. First is desensitization, which states that prolonged exposure to violent content can have a "numbing" effect on audiences, promoting insensitivity or the lack of desire toward helping others when violent encounters happen in real life.

Second, exposure to news messages or TV dramas that portray crime-ridden cities can increase people's fear or anxiety about living in or even traveling to a city.

Media can also have effects on morale and feelings of alienation. The degree of positive or negative mass media depictions of social groups can cause fluctuations in people's sense of morale in belonging to that group or in their sense of alienation from that group.

=== Behavioral ===
There are two broad categories of behavioral effects that Ball-Rokeach and DeFleur identify. The first broad category is called "activation" effects, which refer to instances in which media audiences do something they would not otherwise have done as a consequence of receiving media messages. Behavioral effects are largely thought to work through cognitive and affective effects. For instance, a woman reading a news story about sexism in the workplace might form an attitude toward sexism that creates a negative emotional state, the culmination of which is joining a women's rights march in her local community.

The second broad category of behavioral effects is called "deactivation", and refers to instances in which audiences would have otherwise done something, but don't do as a consequence of media messages. For example, the primary presidential campaign has become longer and increasingly use more media to target audiences. As such, primary campaigns might elicit negative attitudes toward the electoral process and negative affective states such as boredom or disgust that in turn might make a person not turn out to vote.

== The levels of media dependency ==
In the MSD view, the media system has two-way resource-dependency relations with individuals (micro-level), groups and organizations (meso-level), and other social systems (macro-level).

=== The microlevel (individual level) ===
Microlevel, or individual level application, focuses on the relationship between individuals and media. The microlevel dependency, better known as individual level media system dependency (IMD), begins with an assessment of the types of motivation that bring individuals to use the media. In the perspective of IMD, goals are preferred to needs to conceptualize the motivations that affect media behavior. According to Ball-Rokeach and DeFleur, goals are the key dimension of individual motivation. While needs imply both rational and irrational motives, goals imply a problem-solving motivation more appropriate to a theory of media behavior based upon the dependency relation.

==== Three types of motivational goals ====
The IMD approach provides a comprehensive conceptualization of three motivational goals: understanding, orientation, and play.

1. Understanding – needs for individuals to have a basic understanding of themselves and the world around them.
2. Orientation – needs for individuals to direct personal actions effectively and interact successfully with others.
3. Recreation – a way through which one learns roles, norms, and values and its reflected in such activities as sport, dance, and celebration.

=== The macrolevel ===
Every country's media system is interdependent on the country's other social systems (e.g., its economy, its government) for resources, and vice versa. At the macrolevel, dependency theory states these interrelationships influence what kinds of media products are disseminated to the public for consumption, and the range of possible uses people have for media.

==== Media and economic system ====
The media depend on a society's economic system for 1) inculcation and reinforcement of free enterprise values, 2) establishing and maintaining linkages between producers and sellers, and 3) controlling and winning internal conflicts, such as between management and unions. In turn, the media is dependent on a society's economic system for 1) profit from advertising revenue, 2) technological developments that reduce costs and compete effectively with other media outlets, and 3) expansion via access to banking and finance services, as well as international trade.

==== Media and political system ====
A society's media and political system are also heavily interdependent. Political system rely on the media to 1) inculcate and reinforce political values and norm such as freedom, voting, or obedience to the law, 2) maintain order and social integration, 3) organize and mobilize citizens to carry out essential activities like waging war, and 4) control and win conflicts that develop within political domains (e.g., Watergate). Conversely, the media rely on a country's political system for judicial, executive, and legislative protection, formal and informal resources required to cover the news, and revenue that comes from political advertising and subsidies.

==== Media and secondary systems ====
To a lesser extent, media has established interdependencies with several other social systems. The family is dependent on media for inculcation and reinforcement of family values, recreation and leisure, coping with everyday problems of child rearing, marriage, and financial crises. On the other hand, the media is dependent on the family for consuming their media products.

The same is true of media and religious systems. Religious systems rely on media for inculcation and reinforcement of religious values, transmitting religious messages to the masses, and successfully competing with other religious or nonreligious philosophies. In turn, the media relies on the religious system to attain profits from religious organizations who purchase space or air time.

The educational system in a society relies on media for value inculcation and reinforcement, waging successful conflicts or struggles for scarce resources, and knowledge transmission such as in educational media programming. Media depends on the educational system for access to expert information and being able to hire personnel trained in the educational system.

Finally, the military system depends on the media for value inculcation and reinforcement, waging and winning conflicts, and specific organizational goals such as recruitment and mobilization. The media, in turn, depends on the military for access to insider or expert information.

The consequences of all of these interdependencies, again, are alterations in media products that audiences consume. In this way, the system-level interdependencies control media products, the range of possible social uses for media, the extent to which audiences depend on the media to fulfill needs, and ultimately media effects on audiences. Individual differences due to demographics or personality traits might change what people actually do with media messages or how they interpret media messages, but the messages always begin as the result of interdependent social systems.

== Comparison with use and gratification theory ==
Ball-Rokeach summarized the major differences between uses and gratification (U&G) theory and media system dependency (MSD) theory.

=== Conception of audience members ===
Both U&G and MSD theorists view the audience member as active, but the basic conceptions of the audience member differ. U&G theorists focus on psychological and sociodemographic origins of differences in media use. In this perspective, the variability of text interpretation suggests an audience member in charge of the text.

MSD theorists focus on psychological, interpersonal, and sociological origins of differences in micro MSD relations as well as the macro MSD relations that constrain media text production and individual's MSD relations. The responsiveness of micro MSD relations to environmental conditions and the ecological constraints on media production and consumption are important features. In this perspective, the audience member is neither in charge of the text nor controlled by the text. The only way we can predict the effects is the audiences' MSD relations in context of the ecology of macro relations.

=== Conception of interpersonal networks and communication ===
U&G theorists emphasize the role of interpersonal communication in the distortion of media messages and of networks as interpretive communities. In this conception, interpersonal networks are regarded as a safety way against the cultural apparatus of the media and its partners. They believe that the interpersonal network contributes to individual "agency", and the "networked" individual is empowered to manipulate media texts, not to be manipulated by them.

The MSD conception is compatible with the U&G conception up to a point. Consistent with MSD conceptions of the individual member of the active media audience, the interpersonal networks play major roles in MSD theory. They link the individual to public and they link and influence the nature of the individual's relations with the media system.

=== Conception of the media system and of media power ===
U&G theorists in the psychological tradition think of the media system as creators of tentative texts subject to multiple reconstructions. In this perspective, the media system is functional to the extent that it is useful or affords ways for individuals to gratify needs.

The MSD conception is closer to a macro functionalist version of U&G. MSD shares the macro functionalists' view of the media's interdependence with other social and cultural system. In this view, the function of media is seen as a key structure for vertical and horizontal integration of society. The MSD viewpoints seem to be even closer to cultural studies traditions in that the central concern for structural relations of control over information resources that generate the power to create social realities and to negotiate social conflict and social change.

=== Methods of observation, analysis, and interpretation ===
Although both U&G and MSD researchers ask similar questions of individuals, they do so for very different reasons. Those differences are reflected most clearly in (a) the logics of hypothesis formation (b) item and scale construction (c) modes of data analysis, and (d) interpretation of findings.

The MSD researcher essentially wants to know the micro and macro determinants of stability and change in micro MSD relations to learn something about their cross-level consequences for individuals and their interpersonal networks-the dynamics of their inner worlds and how they live in their social worlds. The U&G theorist wants to learn something about the individual's attraction to media texts and the interaction between text and reader to better understand the contributions of reader characteristics to text processing. The differences between micro U&G and micro MSD are, thus, in their epistemological origins, assumptions, concepts, and missions.

== Theoretical applications in social media ==
=== New media dependency (NMD) ===
The characteristics of new media, including social media domain and the unique contents available through participatory use, as adding to the measure of individual dependency relation (IMD), are treated as the mediator. This cognitive process of mediating IMD is called new media dependency (NMD). Age and the popularity of online contents are seen as influential to NMD, in which younger people show higher NMD especially on popular content.

=== The cross-level ===
==== Inevitable limitations ====
1. The mass media centered framework.
2. Its theoretical assumption of asymmetry between mass media and individuals.

However, the communication environment has changed as social media provides more choices for people to actively select information generated by other people, instead of passively receiving from satellites and cable channels.

==== Cross-level analysis of social media ====
Three basic factors of MSD – individual characteristics, social environment, and media system activity – are derived from both micro and macro levels in a society, postulating media remained on a single level. However, the functionality of social media has been suggested as crossing those levels. Through social media, users are able to create the story (on the micro level), and the story can be either shared publicly (on the macro level) or not. Thus, social media gain the ability to move across levels.

=== The argument about studies in social media ===
Particularly, there are many MSD studies in online social networking sites ranging from MySpace to Facebook and Twitter. Yet, scholars still have concerns about whether it is appropriate or not to apply MSD for studying the use of social media.

Some believe that MSD accounts for social media, giving reasons that:

1. MSD provides a framework for the many relationships through which information can flow in social media environment.
2. In the case of social media, the power is dependent on the relationship between the provider of information and the consumer of information, rather than in specific people or positions, which is consistent with what MSD suggests.

On the contrary, others challenge that MSD does not fit well with social media studies, because:

1. Unlike the one-to-many aspect of traditional mass media, social media's many-to-many nature determines that it is difficult to find out who or what is the original generators producing and spreading messages.
2. MSD is inadequate for studying social media as it "mainly accounting for mass media and reducing interpersonal networks to effect gauges".

== Criticisms ==
Baran and Davis identify four primary criticisms of dependency theory:

1. Variability in microlevel and macrolevel measurement makes between-study comparability problematic.
2. The theory is often difficult to empirically verify.
3. The meaning and power of dependency is sometimes unclear.
4. Dependency theory lacks power in explaining long-term effects.
