= Discourse of renewal =

Discourse of renewal is a theory in crisis communication that seeks to establish and emphasize "learning from the crisis, ethical communication, communication that is prospective in nature, and effective organizational rhetoric.”

With a prospective approach, Gordon Lippett established the organizational renewal theory that would lead organizations “to higher stages progressively and to preclude a decline toward a lower stage” of organizational recovery. With the application of discourse of renewal practices, organizations and communities “can consider developing a crisis plan and, more important, build their crisis communication skills over time”.

== Components of Renewal Discourse ==
Multiple stages exist within the discourse of renewal framework. Each of these different stages contain core components that provide an expectation for what an organization should achieve within each stage and provides suggestions for how the organization should progress through each stage. The four significant stages for the discourse of renewal framework are: organizational learning, ethical communication, a prospective rather than retrospective vision, and sound organizational rhetoric.

=== Learning ===
Organizational learning requires the organization as a whole to take account of a crisis situation and consider what caused the crisis to occur and consider how it should have been handled. Crises often make the weak parts of an organization or an organization's response plans visible. This visibility allows these vulnerabilities to be examined and remedied in order to prevent similar failures from occurring in future crisis situations

=== Ethical communication ===
When responding to a crisis, organizations need to be honest, moral, and ethical in addressing the public and stakeholders regarding the status of the crisis and the information they know regarding its causes and consequences. If an organization engaged in unethical behavior prior to a crisis, “those lapses are eventually revealed during and after the crisis”. When an unethical organization attempts to re-emerge after a crisis, full recovery of the organization becomes difficult because of the unethical acts committed previously.

=== Prospective versus retrospective vision ===
In order for an organization to recover, actions taken by the organization throughout the recovery process must be forward-looking and address the faults the organization faced. With consideration to the type of crisis, “issues of responsibility, harm, victimage, and blame may be subordinate to a more optimistic discourse that emphasizes moving beyond the crisis, focusing on strong value positions, responsibility to stakeholders, and growth as a result of the crisis”. Movement to post-crisis and recovery stages suggests “organizations committed to renewal direct their messages toward the ultimate goal of rebuilding the organization so that it is more resilient to crisis, cleanly focuses on values of social responsibility, and more attentive to stakeholder needs”.

=== Effective organizational rhetoric ===
Organizations in crisis must communicate with the public and with stakeholders who are affected by that crisis. By interacting with these groups positively and expressing messages with a prospective outlook, organizational leaders can express confidence regarding the organization's ability to overcome the crisis. In order for this confidence to be received by these audiences, organizational leaders must “frame the crisis in a way that inspires, empowers, and motivates” the public and stakeholders regarding the future of the organization. The language and information presented by organizational leaders possesses the ability to comfort impacted stakeholders when messages are delivered positively; however, negative deliveries can instill concern in the public and stakeholders. A lack of confidence from the public and stakeholders due to the information they received can drastically impact the outcome of an organization's renewal efforts as well as the relationship the organization has with future stakeholders in the post-crisis stage.

== Purpose ==
The discourse of renewal framework directs organizations to consider how to plan for a crisis and negotiate a crisis when they experience one. A major challenge organizations face when planning for a crisis or when they are attempting to manage a crisis situation is the image they convey throughout the recovery and the overall implications of a crisis. It is important that an organization seizes the opportunity to situate the minds of the public and of stakeholders regarding what the crisis means for that organization. A prospective outlook and a plan for direct, honest, and informative communication and recovery allows organizations to establish a positive reputation when responding to a crisis. By engaging in positive discourse and acknowledging the problems they are facing, to the public and the stakeholders, an organization can plan for how to proceed in the post-crisis stage.
