= Supply chain control tower =

Supply-chain coordination and decision-support system

A supply chain control tower (SCCT) is a coordination and decision-support system that combines people, processes and information technology to monitor activities across a supply chain. It consolidates data from internal systems and external partners to improve visibility, identify deviations from plans and support corrective action.

== Functions ==
Control towers commonly combine information concerning inventory, orders, transportation and supplier operations. Their functions can include monitoring events, issuing alerts, analysing disruptions and coordinating responses between supply-chain participants. More advanced systems may use predictive analytics to evaluate alternative responses and support planning and execution.

== Implementation ==
Implementation typically requires integration between different information systems, common data standards and clearly defined operational responsibilities. A 2024 systematic review grouped the critical success factors for control towers into organisational, process and technological dimensions. Poor data quality, limited interoperability and weak coordination between organisations can restrict their effectiveness.

== See also ==
- Supply chain management
- Transportation management system
