= William Benoit =

American political communication scholar

- Born: William Lyon Benoit; March 17, 1953 (age 72); New Castle, Indiana
- Education: Ball State University; Central Michigan University; Wayne State University
- Known for: Image repair theory
- Spouse: Pamela Jean (m. 1974)
- Children: Jennifer M.
- Scientific career
- Fields: Communication studies Political science
- Institutions: University of Missouri; Ohio University; University of Alabama at Birmingham
- Thesis: An analytical study of the development of major concepts of causality in philosophy (1979)

William Lyon Benoit (born March 17, 1953) is an American scholar in the field of political communication. He graduated from Ball State University in 1975 and obtained his Master of Arts degree from Central Michigan University in 1976. He also holds a PhD from Wayne State University.

He is a distinguished professor of Communication Studies at the University of Alabama at Birmingham. He previously taught at Miami University, Bowling Green State University, the University of Missouri, and Ohio University. He was a faculty member at the University of Missouri for twenty-four years. He is known for developing image repair theory (originally called "Image Restoration") and for applying it to anecdotes in various real-world contexts. He was the editor of the Journal of Communication from 2003 to 2005, and of Communication Studies from 2007 to 2009.

== Publications ==
- Reading in Argumentation, Mouton Publishers (Hawthorne, NY), 1992
- Accounts, Excuses, Apologies, State University of New York Press (Albany, NY), 1995
- Candidates in Conflict, University of Alabama Press (Tuscaloosa, AL), 1996
- Campaign '96, Praeger (New York, NY), 1998
- Seeing Spots: A Functional Analysis of Presidential Television Advertisements, 1952–1996, Praeger (Westport, CN), 1999
- The Clinton Scandals and the Politics of Image Restoration, Praeger (West-port, CT), 2001
- The Primary Decision: A Functional Analysis of Debates in Presidential Primaries, Praeger (Westport, CT), 2001
