= Crisis communication =

Sub-specialty of the public relations profession

Crisis communication is a sub-specialty of the public relations profession that is designed to protect and defend an individual, company, or organization facing a public challenge to its reputation. Crisis communication is aimed at raising awareness of a specific type of threat, the magnitude, outcomes, and specific behaviors to adopt to reduce the threat. The communication scholar Timothy Coombs defines crisis as "the perception of an unpredictable event that threatens important expectancies of stakeholders and can seriously impact an organization's performance and generate negative outcomes" and crisis communication as "the collection, processing, and dissemination of information required to address a crisis situation."

Meaning can be socially constructed; because of this, the way that the stakeholders of an organization perceive an event (positively, neutrally, or negatively) is a major contributing factor to whether the event will become a crisis. Additionally, it is important to separate a true crisis situation from an incident. The term crisis "should be reserved for serious events that require careful attention from management."

Crisis management has been defined as "a set of factors designed to combat crises and to lessen the actual damages inflicted." Crisis management should not merely be reactionary; it should also consist of preventative measures and preparation in anticipation of potential crises. Effective crisis management has the potential to greatly reduce the amount of damage the organization receives as a result of the crisis, and may even prevent an incident from ever developing into a crisis.

== Theories in crisis communication research ==
In crisis communication literature, several streams of research exist at the same time. Different theories demonstrate certain ways to look at and explain crisis situations.

=== Apologia Theory ===
"It is, as one would assume, an effort to defend and protect image. But it is not necessarily an apology." This theory would be used by an organization to deny public discourse and address a crisis.

=== Image repair theory (IRT) ===
William Benoit established image repair theory (IRT) based on apologia studies. IRT assumes that image is an asset that a person or an organization attempts to protect during a crisis. When the person or the organization is attacked, the accused should draft messages to repair its image. Benoit further introduced 5 general and 14 specific response strategies the accused could harness during a crisis. General categories include deny, evading responsibility, reducing offensiveness, corrective action, and mortification.

=== Situational crisis communication theory (SCCT) ===
Timothy Coombs started working on situational crisis communication theory (SCCT) in 1995. Originated from attribution theory, SCCT assumes that crises are negative events that stakeholders attempt to attribute responsibility. Coombs believes crisis managers can employ different crisis strategies according to different crisis types. Different from IRT, SCCT is an audience-oriented theory which focuses on stakeholders' perceptions of crisis situations. This idea is in line with Benoit's argument that crisis management concerns perception more so than reality.

=== Social-mediated crisis communication (SMCC) model ===
As social networks and blogs become popular, people spend more time online during crises. Social-mediated crisis communication (SMCC) model is introduced to investigate crisis management in online context. The model first explains how the source and form of information affect response selections and then proposes crisis response strategies. The model argues that five factors influence an organizations' communication during a crisis: crisis origin, crisis type, infrastructure, message strategy, and message form.

The SMCC model can examine how organizations use specific social media platforms during crisis. Organizations can leverage social media analytics to better understand and respond to the public concerns during a crisis. "By monitoring topic and sentiment evolution in real time, authorities can anticipate public reactions, detect misinformation early, and adjust outreach strategies proactively". For example, Twitter can evaluate audiences concerns and needs about specific risks. Furthermore, research indicates that organizations use twitter for response strategies such as "stealing thunder" and "filling the silence"(to post information about updates to avoid rumors). This involves the release of early information and constant updates to limit rumors. This aligns with the SMCC models emphasis on monitoring the public and managing the information flow in online environments.

Additionally, apart from Twitter, another commonly used platform is Instagram. While Twitter focuses on timing and information updates Instagram requires a different approach focused on visual communication and policy guidelines. Instagram requires organizations to prepare platform guidelines in case of a crisis. "Developing social media polices that include guidelines for using Instagram and other social media platforms will be the key".This reflects the SMCC models focus on the need for organizations to establish communication procedures in advance to match each platform.

In addition, the emphasis on how the source and form of information affect the audience's response correlates back to the SMCC model. Audiences interpret crisis messages differently depending on message credibility. Furthermore, "public sentiment toward government communicators plays a crucial role during crisis, influencing societal resilience and potentially contributing to broader trust in government". The research also shows that experts tend to receive more favorable reactions because they are viewed as providing "objective and evidence based information". However research showed that politicians are often viewed as untrustworthy and strategic. Research within the SMCC framework shows that audience interpretation of crisis messages is also shaped by the communicator identity including gender. Thus, gender also produces a significant difference in the publics reactions. Therefore, "posts referencing women communicators are 1.5 times more likely to be positively referenced on social media than men communicators. Similarly, it has been founded based on research that in the beginning of crisis men received more positive expressions than women by the public. Whereas women received an increase in positive expressions as crisis's worsen. These finding illustrate how communicators identity and gender shapes the audiences interpretations to online crisis communication using SMCC models.

=== Integrated crisis mapping (ICM) model ===
Another line of crisis communication research focuses on stakeholders' emotional changes in times of crises. Jin, Pang, and Cameron introduces integrated crisis mapping (ICM) model to understand stakeholders' varied emotion during a crisis. ICM assumes that people keep interpreting their emotions during a crisis. Through Jin, Pang, and Cameron's analyzation of fourteen real-life crisis case studies, they found that "anxiety was the default emotion in most, if not all, crisis posited in the model." However, common dominant emotions expressed during a crisis also include anger, fright and sadness; these vary depending on the nature of the crisis.

=== Covariation-based approach to crisis communication ===
As an extension of SCCT, Andreas Schwarz suggested to apply Kelley's covariation principle (attribution theory) more consistently in crisis communication to better explain the emergence and perception of causal attributions in crisis situations and deduce certain information strategies from this model and/or according findings. In this approach the three informational dimensions of consensus, distinctiveness, and consistency are conceptualized for situations of organizational crises (or other types of crisis) to predict the likelihood of stakeholders to make organizational attributions, entity attributions, or circumstance attributions and subsequently influence responsibility perceptions and evaluations of organizational reputation.

=== Discourse of renewal ===
The discourse of renewal theory examines the components an organization can employ when navigating a crisis in order to mitigate significant issues within the organization when entering the post-crisis stage. It is a theory assessed by Gregory Ulmer, Timothy Sellnow, and Matthew Seeger as a framework that "emphasizes learning from the crisis, ethical communication, communication that is prospective in nature, and effective organizational rhetoric".

=== Rhetorical Arena Theory (RAT) ===
Developed by Frandsen and Johansen (2010; 2017), RAT distinguishes itself from other crisis communication research due to its multi-vocal approach. RAT assumes that there are various voices which all communicate with one another inside a 'rhetorical arena' to co-construct the crisis dialogue. Therefore, RAT focuses on understanding the patterns of interaction between said various voices. For the purpose of their theory, the term 'rhetorical arena' is used to denote a space that opens during a crisis where different actors, including other corporations, political actors, activists, experts, and the media, talk to and about each other.

== Categories of crisis management ==
Coombs identifies three phases of crisis management.

1. Pre-crisis: preparing ahead of time for crisis management in an effort to prevent a future crisis from occurring. This category is also sometimes called the prodromal crisis stage.
2. Crisis: the response to an actual crisis event.
3. Post-crisis: occurs after the crisis has been resolved; the efforts by the crisis management team to understand why the crisis occurred and to learn from the event.

Inside the management step, Bodeau-Ostermann identifies 6 successive phases: - reaction, where the group behaves on first sight, - extension, because the crisis dilutes itself and touches neighbours, - means (material and human), which constitutes an overview of success/failures of emergency reaction, - focus, stands as a concrete action or event on which the team leaders concentrate to fight crisis, - retraction, is the moment where the group diminishes means involved, in accordance with its aims, - rehabilitation, where, as a last step, result is, for the group, emergence of new values, stronger than the older.

Auer (2020), challenges the three phases approach to crisis communication, arguing that a crisis communicator can mistakenly assume that the post-crisis stage is underway, when in fact, there is merely a "lull" in the crisis. The risk is heightened for crises that are long-lasting or that have "waves" – like Covid-19.

== Crisis response strategy ==
Both situational crisis communication theory and image repair theory assume organizations should protect their reputation and image through appropriate responses to the crisis. As a result, crisis communication research often focuses on how organization craft effective response messages. Image repair theory identifies several response strategies commonly used by organizations, including denial, evasion of responsibility, reduction of offensiveness, corrective action, and mortification. Specifically, denial strategy contains two sub-strategies, simple denial and shift blame. Evade responsibility strategy includes provocation, defeasibility, accident, good intention. Reduce offensiveness strategy garners bolstering, minimization, differentiation, transcendence, attack accuser, and compensation.

SCCT also offers a handful of strategies: denial, scapegoat, attack the accuser, excuse, justification, ingratiation, concern, compassion, regret, apology. According to Combs, the effectiveness of a response strategy depends on the nature of the crisis and the degree of responsibility attributed to the organization.

The article "Crisis response and crisis timing strategies, two sides of the same coin" by Claeys and Cauberghe discusses crisis management strategies and the importance of timing in responding to crises. Crisis response and crisis timing strategies are two sides of the same coin and should be considered together when developing crisis management plans.

Different crisis response strategies include denial, diminish, rebuild, and reinforce. Crisis timing strategies include pre-crisis preparation, crisis identification, assessment, and communication. Timing is critical in crisis management, as delays or inappropriate responses can worsen the crisis. The relationship between crisis response and crisis timing strategies, arguing that these two strategies should be integrated and not treated as separate entities. An effective crisis management plan should consider both strategies and use them in a coordinated and complementary way. Practical recommendations for crisis managers. creating a crisis management plan that integrates both response and timing strategies, conducting regular crisis simulations and rehearsals, and communicating with stakeholders throughout the crisis management process.

== Crisis communication tactics ==
=== Pre-crisis ===
- Researching and collecting information about crisis risks specific to the organization or citizen population.
- Creating a crisis management plan that includes making decisions ahead of time about who will handle specific aspects of a crisis if and when it occurs. An example of this would be how Greece has a Xenokratis plan and Egelados plan which defines "responsibilities of the public bodies at central, regional and local levels".
- Conducting exercises to test the plan at least annually.
- Preparing press release templates for the organization's public relations team in the event of a crisis.
- Preparing a "dark (unpublished) page" on the organization's website that can be activated as needed to use as an authoritative source of information about the crisis.
- The chain of command that all employees or citizens will follow in the dissemination of information to all publics during a crisis situation.

A rapid response crisis communications team should be organized during the pre-crisis stage and all individuals who will help with the actual crisis communication response should be trained. At this stage the communication professional focuses on detecting and identifying possible risks that could result in a crisis.These principles apply across different types of companies such as government agencies managing seismic disasters.

=== In-crisis ===
The in crisis phase follows the pre-crisis phase. Within this phase the company or government agencies must use the information and strategies gathered in the pre-crisis phase to react to the crisis at hand. The in-crisis phase contains two primary components which are initial critical response and reputation repair. The initial critical response must occur early in this phase as well as be precise and correct information. "This is evident in practice, Japan agencies maintained credibility by openly correcting early estimates and producing constant updates to keep the public safe following the 2011 Tohoku earthquake". If the information collected in the previous phase is incorrect, the time in which the company or agency reacts to the crisis does not matter. The reputation repair component calls for the company or agency to take responsibility for the crisis at hand and propose sufficient reimbursement for damages done to those who are affected by the crisis.

=== Post-crisis ===
- Reviewing and dissecting the successes and failures of the crisis management team in order to make any necessary changes to the organization, its employees, practices, or procedures.
- Providing follow-up crisis messages as necessary.

Timothy Coombs proposes that post-crisis communication should include the following five steps:

- Deliver all information promised to stakeholders as soon as that information is known.
- Keep stakeholders updated on the progression of recovery efforts including any corrective measures being taken and the progress of investigations.
- Analyze the crisis management effort for lessons and integrate those lessons in to the organization's crisis management system.
- Scan the Internet channels for online memorials.
- Consult with victims and their families to determine the organization's role in any anniversary events or memorials.

In general, Timothy Coombs raises some practices regarding to crisis response strategy based on SCCT that crisis managers should consider carefully.

- All victims or potential victims should receive instructing information, including recall information. This is one-half of the base response to a crisis.
- All victims should be provided an expression of sympathy, any information about corrective actions and trauma counseling when needed. This can be called the "care response." This is the second half of the base response to a crisis.
- For crises with minimal attributions of crisis responsibility and no intensifying factors, instructing information and care response is sufficient.
- For crises with minimal attributions of crisis responsibility and an intensifying factor, add excuse and/or justification strategies to the instructing information and care response.
- For crises with low attributions of crisis responsibility and no intensifying factors, add excuse and/or justification strategies to the instructing information and care response.
- For crises with low attributions of crisis responsibility and an intensifying factor, add compensation and/or apology strategies to the instructing information and care response.
- For crises with strong attributions of crisis responsibility, add compensation and/or apology strategies to the instructing information and care response.
- The compensation strategy is used anytime victims suffer serious harm.
- The reminder and ingratiation strategies can be used to supplement any response.
- Denial and attack the accuser strategies are best used only for rumor and challenge crises.

== Benoit's 5 Major Strategies ==
=== Denial ===
There are two forms of denial: Simple denial which involves denying the involvement or the act, and shifting the blame, which is also known as Scapegoating. Shifting the blame or scapegoating in crisis communication refers to the tendency of organizations to blame an individual or group for a crisis in order to divert attention from their own responsibility and protect their reputation. This is a quick fix strategy but often can create long-term negative consequences for the organization itself and the individual or group taking the blame. Scapegoating can cause a decrease in trust from consumers or stakeholders and can also have a decrease in organizational reputation.

=== Evasion of Responsibility ===
Evading responsibility is the second strategy and consists of four distinct types of evasion:

1. Provocation refers to a company that argues that they were simply reacting to another offensive act. A company or individual can rationalize their behavior to be seen by others as a rational response to the initial offensive act.
2. Defeasibility suggests that a company or individual will claim that they had limited knowledge or control over the crisis situation. This allows for companies or individuals to show that they did not know they were partaking in offensive behaviors.
3. Accidents are a way a company can claim that the problem occurred by chance and not intentionally which could reduce the damage done to the companies reputation as they would be viewed by others as less responsible for the crisis.
4. Good intentions, suggest that it was done with good intentions in mind, despite the negative outcome. The company asks others to hold them less than fully responsible based on their good intentions rather than their bad.

=== Reducing Offensiveness ===
The apologists will attempt to reduce the offensiveness of the acts committed through six strategies:

- Bolstering involves the organization or individual who engaged in wrongful behavior to try and focus the attention of others on the more positive contributions they have made in the past.
- Minimizing is when the party under question tries to minimize the negative aspects of a situation such as expressing confidence that it is simply a misunderstanding.
- Differentiation is the act of comparing the wrongdoing to a similar situation that has occurred in the past and had a worse outcome than the current crisis.
- Transcending is when a company or individual tries to attribute more favorable benefits to acts committed. This could be something such as relaying only the benefits of the actions instead of the consequences.
- Attacking is a strategy where the accusers credibility is questioned in an attempt to have others lose confidence in the claims made by accusers.
- Offering compensation is the final strategy that companies or individuals use to reduce offensiveness. If the people affected are willing, the responsible party can offer sufficient compensation for damages done as a result of the party's actions.

=== Corrective Action ===
The company or individual responsible for the problem that has occurred will promise to correct the problem and return to the standard it was before, or they will promise to stop the problem from reoccurring in the future by implementing new standards and guidelines in order to rebuild their reputation. This is often a problem among companies where some want to correct their actions, and others believe that it is an over correction and that it is a sort of unnecessary admission of guilt.

=== Mortification ===
In terms of image restoration, the last strategy used is mortification where the apologist will confess to the wrongdoing and ask for forgiveness from others. The intention with strategy is that people will respect the honesty and the awareness of the apologist to recognize their wrongdoing and take responsibility. Mortification is the most direct of Benoit's strategies and is often seen side by side with corrective action strategy.

== Crisis fatigue in the digital age ==
Recent research has identified crisis fatigue as a critical barrier to effective crisis communication in the digital era. The term refers to a cognitive and emotional state where individuals become overwhelmed or numb due to prolonged or repeated exposure to crises, often via online platforms and social media. Samet (2025) argues that crisis fatigue can reduce stakeholder attentiveness, hinder behavioral compliance, and undermine long-term organizational trust. He proposes that organizations adapt by reducing message saturation, pacing their communication, and prioritizing clarity, empathy, and audience segmentation in prolonged crisis scenarios.

== Crisis communication dilemma ==
An increasing number of studies are investigating "stealing thunder". The concept originates from law, which indicates that lawyers report flaws in their own cases instead of giving the opponent opportunities to find the flaw. Journal articles frequently demonstrates the advantage of adopting "stealing thunder" strategy in minimizing reputational loss during crises. They argue organizations should report the problems first. However, the strategy itself is fundamentally counter-intuitive. Companies are unwilling to disclose their crisis because there is a chance that the public will never know.

"Stealing thunder" in crisis communication and how perceived organizational transparency affects its effectiveness. Stealing thunder refers to the proactive release of negative information by an organization before it is released by external sources. The article "How to Maximize the Effectiveness of Stealing Thunder in Crisis Communication: The Moderating Role of Perceived Organizational Transparency" by Kim and Lee examines the concept of "stealing thunder" in crisis communication and how perceived organizational transparency affects its effectiveness.

The authors conducted two experimental studies to investigate the relationship between stealing thunder and perceived organizational transparency. The first study found that stealing thunder is more effective in enhancing an organization's reputation when the organization is perceived as transparent. The second study found that perceived organizational transparency moderated the relationship between stealing thunder and crisis response strategies, with stealing thunder being more effective when organizations are perceived as more transparent.

"Stealing Thunder" is a controversial topic. Research would suggest being proactive and disclosing negative information early on can help minimize repetitional damage, it is understandable that companies would still be hesitant to do so. The fear of negative publicity and the potential impact of their business can make it difficult to disclose information that could harm their reputation. Crisis communication is about managing the situation in the best way possible. Business being proactive and disclosing negative information early on can demonstrate transparency and willingness to take responsibility for their actions. This builds truest and credibility with stakeholders, which is crucial in times of crisis. Companies needs to analyze the risk and benefits of "stealing thunder" and decide the best course of actions for their organization. They may even consider seeking advice from crisis communication experts or conducting a risk assessment for an informative decision.

Effective crisis communication can help organizations maintain or enhance their reputation in the face of a crisis. Existing research shows with a focus on the interplay between reputation and crisis response strategies businesses can have effective crisis communication. Several key factors that can affect the effectiveness of crisis communication include the timing and type of response, the credibly of the source, and the nature of the crisis. In the "Corporate Crisis Communication: Examining the Interplay of Reputation and Crisis Response Strategies" the article emphasizes the importance of managing corporate reputation during a crisis. Effective crisis communication can help organization maintain and/or enhance their reputation in the face of a crisis. Organization should adopt a proactive approach to crisis communication, that involves being transparent and honest about the situation, acknowledging any mistakes or shortcomings, and taking responsibility for addressing the crisis.

According to the article effective crisis communication requires a well-crafted response strategy that is tailored to the specific crisis at hand. It is suggested that organizations should consider factors such as the severity of the crisis, the stakeholders involved, and potential impact on the organization's reputation when developing their response strategy. The article highlights the importance of timing in crisis communication, noting that a prompt and decisive response can mitigate repetitional damage.

Research has shown that proactive crisis communication can be effective in reducing the negative impact of a crisis on an organization's reputation. In particular, "stealing thunder" has been shown to be an effective strategy for minimizing reputational damage. There are several examples of organizations that have successfully used this strategy to manage crises, including Johnson & Johnson's response to the Tylenol poisonings and Toyota's response to its sudden-acceleration crisis. The decision to adopt a proactive crisis communication strategy can be difficult for organizations, as it involves acknowledging the crisis and potentially damaging information. However, the benefits of proactive communication, including the ability to control the narrative and minimize reputational damage, outweigh the risks. The author suggests that organizations should develop a crisis communication plan that includes a proactive communication strategy and that is tailored to the specific crisis at hand.

The use of proactive crisis communication and the use of "stealing thunder" can be an effective strategy for managing crisis and minimizing reputational damage. Organizations should prioritize transparency in their crisis communication strategies and proactively release negative information to maintain their reputation. Organizations should consider the timing and content of their "stealing thunder" strategy, as well as the level of transparency that stakeholders perceive. The importance of perceived organizational transparency in the effectiveness of stealing thunder as a crisis communication strategy. Organizations should prioritize transparency and consider the timing and content of their stealing thunder strategy to maintain their reputation during a crisis.

== Artificial Intelligence in Crisis Communication ==
The integration of artificial intelligence (AI) into crisis communication has reshaped how organizations monitor, predict, and respond to emergencies. AI systems are increasingly used for real-time sentiment analysis, tracking misinformation, and generating automated messages during crises such as natural disasters, pandemics, and reputational incidents.

These applications can be seen in real world case studies. A real world case study that used artificial intelligence and Machine Learning (ML) was Covid-19. During Covid-19, AI and ML were specifically used for "data management, virus tracking, misinformation mitigation, and communication strategy enhancement". The use of these resources during this crisis was additionally used for the World Health Organization (WHO) "to provide real-time updates, correct misinformation, and answer frequently asked questions in multiple languages". The research indicates using AI in crisis can influence communication and safety overall. While the pandemic required AI for crisis response, natural disasters present a different challenge. Additionally, in the case of hurricane Katrina it was the catalyst to the evolution of AI usage in natural disasters for crisis response. Therefore, to combat the unpredictability of natural disasters in later hurricanes such as Sandy and Harvey they integrated the usage of AI and ML. Beyond hurricanes AI has also been applied to wildfires. According to European Journal of Innovative Studies and Sustainability, when the Australian bush fires occurred to maintain safety for all citizens at risk "AI applications used satellite imagery analysis and fire propagation pattern prediction to track fires and assess community risks". Citizens received updates allowing them time to evacuate if needed. Allowing the firefighter to focus on containing the fires.

AI-powered chatbots and data-mining tools enable faster dissemination of verified information, while also presenting ethical concerns regarding transparency, bias, and accountability in automated communication responses. Recent studies emphasize the importance of maintaining a human-in-the-loop approach to ensure empathy, credibility, and ethical integrity in AI-assisted crisis communication.

Beyond the ethical considerations, AI plays a key role in building organizational market resilience during crisis. Market resilience is when a company has to adapt to changes to continue operating while navigating a crisis. Furthermore, scholars describe "AI tools not only supporting operational improvements but can also enhance marketing resilience, helping small and medium-sized enterprises' (SMEs) adapt quickly to market disruptions and navigate uncertain environments". The Marketing resilience can occur when "AI analyzes customer data to develop targeted marketing strategies, and these technologies support brands in creating more flexible and sustainable marketing strategies, allowing them to adapt to current situations and become more resilient to future crises". Through AI powered tools and data analysis, organizations can build marketing resilience that supports their crisis communication strategies.

== Landmark crisis communication case studies ==
- The Tylenol-Tampering Crisis – 1982 and 1986
- The Exxon-Valdez-Oil Spill Crisis — 1989
- The Bridgestone/Firestone & Ford-Tire Crisis – 1990s
- The McDonald's-Hot Coffee Crisis – 1992
- The Pepsi-Syringe Crisis - 1993
- The Dominos-YouTube Crisis - 2009
- The BP Gulf oil spill — 2010
- The Love Parade stampede crisis in Duisburg (Germany) 2010
- The Toronto Mayor Rob Ford scandals of 2013–2014
- Malaysia Airlines' MH 370 disappearance
- The 2017 United Express Flight 3411 incident
- Most major companies during the COVID-19 pandemic
- The 2022 Southwest Airlines scheduling crisis

== See also ==
- Crisis management

== References and external links ==
- Coombs, W. Timothy (2007), Ongoing Crisis Communication: Planning, Managing, and Responding, Los Angeles: Sage
- Coombs, W. Timothy (2012), Parameters for Crisis Communication in "The Handbook of Crisis Communication" Eds. W. Timothy Coombs & Sherry J. Holladay, West Sussex, UK: Blackwell Publishing Ltd., ISBN 978-1-4051-9441-9
- Fink, Steven (1986). "3: Anatomy of a Crisis". Crisis management: planning for the inevitable. New York, NY: American Management Association. pp. 20–28.
- Schwarz, A., Seeger, M., & Auer, C. (eds.) (2016). The handbook of international crisis communication research. Chichester: Wiley Blackwell: Stockmyer, John (1996), ""Brands in Crisis: Consumer Help For Deserving Victims", in NA - Advances in Consumer Research Volume 23, eds. Kim P. Corfman and John G. Lynch Jr.", Acr North American Advances, NA-23, Provo, UT: Association for Consumer Research: 429–435
- Crisis Management and Communication Entry Essential Knowledge Project from the Institute for Public Relations
- International Research Group on Crisis Communication Publications and crisis institutions database at Ilmenau University of Technology (English pages available)
- The 3 Most Effective Crisis Communication Strategies - Debra B. Davenport Purdue University Online Masters of Science in Communication degree program.
