= Communication Studies (journal) =

- Discipline: Communication studies
- Language: English
- Edited by: Sandra Falkner

Publication details
- Former name: Central States Speech Journal
- History: 1949–present
- Publisher: Routledge
- Frequency: 6/year
- Open access: Hybrid

Standard abbreviations
- ISO 4: Commun. Stud.

Indexing
- ISSN: 1051-0974 (print); 1745-1035 (web)
- LCCN: 56046080
- OCLC no.: 1039363909

Links
- Journal homepage; Online access; Online archive; Journal page at association's website

Communication Studies is a peer-reviewed academic journal that covers communication processes, specifically communication theory and research. It was established in 1949 as the Central States Speech Journal, obtaining its current title in 1989. The editor-in-chief is Sandra Falkner (Bowling Green State University). It is published in 6 issues a year by Routledge and is an official journal of the Central States Communication Association. The journal issues open science badges on articles meeting the criteria of the Center for Open Science.

According to data published in Scientometrics, Communication Studies was rated as the fifth-most central journal to the field of human communication.

== Abstracting and indexing ==
The journal is abstracted and indexed in EBSCO databases, Emerging Sources Citation Index, ProQuest databases, and Scopus.

== Editors ==
The following persons are or have been editor-in-chief of the journal:

- 2025–Present: Sandra Falkner (Bowling Green State University)
- 2022–2024: Yuping Mao (California State University, Long Beach)
- 2019–2021: Patric R. Spence (University of Central Florida)
- 2016–2018: Kenneth Lachlan (University of Connecticut)
- 2013–2015: Robert S. Littlefield (North Dakota State University)
- 2009–2012: Kim Powell (Luther College)
- 2007–2009: William L. Benoit (University of Missouri)
- 2004–2006: Jim L. Query, Jr. (Ohio University)
- 2001–2003: Mike Allen (University of Wisconsin Milwaukee)
- 1998–2000: Paul A. Mongeau (Miami University)
- 1995–1997: J. Kevin Barge (Texas A&M University)
- 1992–1994: Randy Y. Hirokawa (University of Iowa)
- 1989–1991: Richard E. Crable (Purdue University)
- 1986–1988: George Ziegelmueller (Wayne State University)
- 1983–1985: Bruce E. Gronbeck (University of Iowa)
- 1980–1982: Dennis S. Gouran (Indiana University)
- 1977–1979: James R. Andrews (Indiana University)
- 1973–1976: Donovan J. Ochs (University of Iowa)
- 1969–1972: James W. Gibson (University of Missouri)
- 1965–1968: Roger E. Nebergall (University of Illinois)
- 1962–1964: Robert P. Friedman (University of Oregon)
- 1958–1961: Keith Brooks (Ohio State University)
- 1954–1958: Kim Giffin (University of Kansas)
- 1951–1953: Leland M. Griffin (Northwestern University)
- 1949–1950: Ernest Brandenburg (Washington University in St. Louis)
