= Genre studies =

Branch of general critical theory

Genre studies is an academic subject which studies genre theory as a branch of general critical theory in several different fields, including art, literature, linguistics, rhetoric and composition studies.

Literary genre studies is a structuralist approach to the study of genre and genre theory in literary theory, film theory, and other cultural theories. The study of a genre in this way examines the structural elements that combine in the telling of a story and finds patterns in collections of stories. When these elements (or semiotic codes) begin to carry inherent information, a genre emerges.

Linguistic genre studies can be roughly divided into two schools, Systemic Functional Linguistics or "SFL", and English for Specific Purposes or "ESP." SFL scholars believe that language structure is an integral part of a text's social context and function. SFL scholars often conduct research that focuses on genres' usefulness in pedagogy. ESP also examines the pedagogical implications of genre, focusing in particular on genre analysis as a means to help non-native English speakers to use the language and its conventions. ESP genre analysis involves identifying discourse elements such as register, formation of conceptual and genre structures, modes of thought and action that exist in a specific discourse community.

A third approach developed from scholarship in New Rhetorics, principally Carolyn R. Miller's article "Genre as Social Action" and is called rhetorical genre studies (RGS). RGS has found wide application in composition studies, whose scholars insist that the textual forms that are usually called "genres" are only traces of recurring social action. The social action itself, in other words, is the genre, not the document or text that it leaves behind.

== Literary and linguistic branches ==
=== Systemic functional linguistics ===
Systemic functional linguistics scholars believe that language is organized within cultures based on cultural ideologies. The "systemic" of SFL refers to the system as a whole, in which linguistic choices are made. SFL is based largely on the work of Michael Halliday, who believed that individuals make linguistic choices based on the ideologies of the systems that those individuals inhabit. For Halliday, there is a "network of meanings" within a culture, that constitutes the "social semiotic" of that culture. This "social semiotic" is encoded and maintained by the discourse system of the culture. For Halliday, contexts in which texts are produced recur, in what he calls "situation types." People raised within a specific culture become accustomed to the "situation types" that occur within that culture, and are more easily able to maneuver through the "situation types" within that culture than people who were not brought up within it.

Halliday's approach to cultural context in the formation of recurrent "situation types" influenced other scholars, such as J.R. Martin, to develop a linguistic pedagogy called the 'Sydney School'. Martin led the SFL pedagogical approach, which emphasized the role of context in text formation. Martin and his associates believed that process-based approaches to education ignored the cultural boundaries of texts, and privileged middle- and upper- class students at the expense of students from lower-class backgrounds. According to Martin and other SFL scholars, an explicit focus on genre in literature would help literacy teaching. Focusing on genre reveals the contexts that influences texts, and teaches those contexts to students, so that they can create texts that are culturally informed.

Through their genre work in schools, Martin and his associates developed a definition of genre as a "staged, goal-oriented, social process." In the Martinian genre model, genres are staged because they accomplish tasks that require multiple steps; they are goal-oriented because their users are motivated to see the completion of the stages to the end; and they are social because users address their texts to specific audiences.

=== English for Specific Purposes ===
English for Specific Purposes scholarship has been around since the 1960s, but ESP scholars did not begin using genre as a pedagogical approach until the 1980s, when John Swales published Genre Analysis: English in Academic and Research Settings, in which Swales laid out the methodological approach that brought together ESP and genre analysis. Swales identified two characteristics of ESP genre analysis: its focus on academic research in English and its use of genre analysis for applied ends. ESP focuses on specific genres within spheres of activity, such as the medical profession, but it also focuses on the broader concept of communicative purposes within fields of study.

English for Specific Purposes shares some characteristics with SFL studies. Both believe that linguistic features are connected to social context and function, and both aim to help disadvantaged students grasp the system in which texts are created so that they can create similar texts, by teaching them the relationship between language and social function. Both try to accomplish their goals by teaching specific genres to underprivileged users.

However, there are also some important differences between ESP and SFL. Whereas SFL scholars focus on teaching basic genre structures to primary and secondary school students, ESP scholars are focused on teaching Professional and Academic disciplinary genres to University- and graduate-level students. ESP students tend to be more bound to discursive genre subjects, within very particular contexts. ESP focuses on micro-level genres and contexts, whereas SFL focuses on macro-level contexts.

=== Rhetorical genre studies ===
Rhetorical genre studies or RGS (a term coined by Aviva Freedman) scholars examine genre as typified social action, as ways of acting based in recurrent social situations. This founding principle for RGS was developed in Carolyn R. Miller's essay "Genre as Social Action," which was published in 1984. In her article, Miller draws on Lloyd Bitzer's notion of exigence as "an imperfection marked by an urgency", that is a condition in the world that serves as an "external cause of discourse." Miller modifies this objective view with Kenneth Burke's notion of "motive" as internal source of human action. Drawing on Alfred Schutz's phenomenological concept of typification, she views situations and exigences as social constructions. Genres are typified ways of responding to recurring social situations. As a consequence genres are not fixed in number and cannot be organized into a taxonomy; rather they are evolving historical constructions that "change, evolve, and decay." A rhetorical approach focuses on genres not as forms but as communicative actions.

RGS scholarship has developed beyond Miller's founding definition of genre. Charles Bazerman examined the historical evolution of the experimental article in the sciences and social sciences demonstrating how the major features and variations emerged. He analyzed how the changing forms of the genre and the proliferation of its varieties carried out the activities of those sciences, formed the knowledge of various disciplines, and established criteria about how knowledge should be formulated and evaluated. He also found evidence about how genre expectations influenced the social structure and values of sciences. He then examined how practices of intertextuality and citation developed with modern scientific genres to create more collaborative relations within sciences. Carol Berkenkotter and Thomas Huckin begin with the notion that genre is knowledge foundation, and argue that genres embody communities' knowledge and ways of acting. For Berkenkotter and Huckin, genre becomes a way of navigating social activity. As such, it is dynamic, because the conditions of social activity are always in flux. Recurrence, they claim, involves variation. Berkenkotter and Huckin redefine genre as social cognition.

The notion of "uptake" is also integral to RGS scholars' understanding of genre. Anne Freadman uses uptake to describe the ways in which genres interact with each other in her articles "Uptake" and "Anyone for Tennis?". She uses the game of tennis to explain the ways genres, as typified actions, are "taken up" by writers (tennis players). Tennis players, she says, do not exchange tennis balls, they exchange shots. Each shot only has meaning within the game, its rules, and the context of the game being played. Shots are meaningful because they take place in a game. The game is meaningful because it takes place within "ceremonials." Thus, the final at Wimbledon provides a different context than a game between friends. Genres are the games that take place within ceremonials, and shots are utterances, or verbal exchanges. We cannot really understand a text without understanding the ceremonial in which it occurs. "Uptake" is the illocutionary response elicited by particular situations.

A number of different scholars have proposed terms that highlight the different ways genres may be related to each other. Amy Devitt initially proposed "genre sets" as those genres produced by an individual actor, carrying out that person's various roles, as part of the person's role set. Bazerman proposed "genre systems" to indicate the systematic unfolding of genres in an activity setting. John Swales proposed a similar term, "genre sequences." Clay Spinuzzi, with his term "genre ecologies," emphasized a more open set of genre options in a setting. Vijay Bhatia proposed "genre colonies" to note how genres move from one activity system to another to create new clusters of genres. For instance, if we were to take a courtroom as an activity system, the judge's genre set could be defined as only those genres used by the judge, while all the communications produced by all the witnesses, lawyers, and other court officers would be included within the genre system, and the regularized series of utterances from judge to lawyers to witnesses could be identified as a genre sequence. The total range of kinds of utterances in the court would form a genre ecology, and the introduction of technical discourses through, for example, the testimony of expert witnesses could indicate the colonization of genres from one domain to another. Bazerman, in a more complex example, studied the history and workings of the multiple activity systems and their associated genres that Thomas Edison needed to engage with, including journalism, finances and equity markets, patents and the courts, civic regulation, industrial laboratories, commercial marketing, corporate organization and others, in order to develop a system of lighting and centralized power. The technical innovations only became possible by gaining presence, meaning and value within the communications of each of these systems.

Another influence on rhetorical genre studies comes from M.M. Bakhtin's analysis of genre, based in literary criticism and non-structural dialogic linguistics. Bakhtin considers genre as responsive to social, situational context, laden with intertextual history and ideology. Bakhtin states, "Utterances and their types, that is, speech genres are the drive belts from the history of society to the history of language." His work strengthened the developing view of genre both as a semiotic structure and as a recurrent action analogous to the speech act or utterance. Translated into English from the Russian in 1986, Bakhtin's "Problem of Speech Genres" began to influence genre studies in the 1990's (for examples, in the work of Berkenkotter and Huckin, Devitt, Freedman, Journet, and Schryer.

=== Literary conventions ===
Conventions are usual indicators such as phrases, themes, quotations, or explanations that readers expect to find in a certain genre. They could be considered "stereotypes" of that genre. For example, Science fiction is expected to be set in the future, and have futuristic events, technological advances, and futuristic ideas. Realism is expected to contain a story about people who could pass as real, struggling through real-life situations and/or real world events, etc.

Critic Paul Alpers explains that literary conventions are like meeting places where past and present writers "come together" to determine the form a convention should take in a particular literary instance (work). In practical terms, this coming together is a matter of the present writer consulting the work of predecessors, but Alpers wants to connote the sense of active negotiation and accommodation that takes place between the writer and the genre he or she is working in (a genre defined by other people). According to Alpers, a misconception persists in modern criticism that literary convention is an "arbitrary and inflexible practice, established by widespread usage and imposed from without." Convention in this sense is the "antithesis of the personal and individual"; it is "felt to constrain the [writer]." Alpers reconceptualizes literary convention as something "constitutive and enabling." For him, generic conventions are "not fixed procedures imposed by impersonal tradition;" rather, they are the living "usages of other [writers]," "the shared practice of those who come together." Thinking of generic conventions as a practice shared by many users, allows later writers to exercise the same degree of control over convention as those who predated them. Far from constraining writers, convention provides flexibility to preserve certain aspects of a genre and transform others. Convention in this sense enables "individual expression, because the [writer] is seen as responsive to, even when challenging, his predecessors and fellows."

Genre theorist David Fishelov also deals with generic conventions—he calls them "generic rules"—in elaborating his explanatory metaphor of "literary genres as social institutions" in the book Metaphors of Genre: The Role of Analogies in Genre Theory. Fishelov, like Alpers, sees generic conventions as an inescapably "vital part of the literary communicative situation," linking present and past writers to each other, as well as to readers. Established conventions are "a challenge, or a horizon, against which the writer and his reader have to define themselves." The writer may respond to this challenge by "stretch[ing] the generic rules."

Fishelov draws his metaphor of genre as social institution from a passage in René Welleck and Austin Warren's Theory of Literature:

The literary kind [genre] is an 'institution'—as Church, University, or State is an institution. It exists not as an animal exists or even as a building, chapel, library, or capital, but as an institution exists. One can work through, express oneself through, existing institutions, create new ones, or get on, so far as possible, without sharing in politics or rituals; one can also join, but then reshape institutions.

This formulation ascribes agency to actors within social institutions. In the same way institutions like churches, universities, and states organize social actors to accomplish collective social purposes, literary genres organize relationships between writers and readers to accomplish communicative purposes, which change over time. Genres are not static, but rather, like social institutions, persist through the constant renovation of their conventions by individuals. Fishelov is particularly helpful in theorizing the role of the reader in alternately constraining and motivating generic change:

[T]he reader demands compliance with the established generic conventions so that he can integrate the new text, but at the same time he expects the writer to manipulate these established conventions so that the new text is more than a tedious repetition of the generic tradition.

Reader expectations operate as both a constraint on the writer and a "latent demand for innovation." The writer "is expected to manipulate the existing conventions and to carry them (at least) one step further…. From the writer's perspective, the generic convention is a model to follow but also a challenge to overcome." Fishelov explains that writers choose or are compelled to manipulate prevailing conventions for a variety of aesthetic and thematic reasons.

== History of genre theory ==
Genre theory or genre studies got underway with the Ancient Greeks, who felt that particular types of people would produce only certain types of poetry. or oratory. Regarding literary theory, the Greeks also believed that certain metrical forms were suited only to certain genres. Aristotle said,

We have, then, a natural instinct for representation and for tune and rhythm—and starting with these instincts men very gradually developed them until they produced poetry out of their improvisations. Poetry then split into two kinds according to the poet's nature. For the more serious poets represented the noble deeds of noble men, while those of a less exalted nature represented the actions of inferior men, at first writing satire just as the others wrote hymns and eulogies.

This is all based on Plato's mimetic principle. Exalted people will, in imitation of exaltation, write about exalted people doing exalted things, and vice versa with the "lower" types (Farrell, 383). Genre was not a black-and-white issue even for Aristotle, who recognized that though the "Iliad" is an epic it can be considered a tragedy as well, both because of its tone as well as the nobility of its characters. However, most of the Greek critics were less acutely aware—if aware at all—of the inconsistencies in this system. For these critics, there was no room for ambiguity in their literary taxonomy because these categories were thought to have innate qualities that could not be disregarded.

The Romans carried on the Greek tradition of literary criticism. The Roman critics were quite happy to continue on in the assumption that there were essential differences between the types of poetry and drama. There is much evidence in their works that Roman writers themselves saw through these ideas and understood genres and how they function on a more advanced level. However, it was the critics who left their mark on Roman literary criticism, and they were not innovators.

Regarding rhetorical genres, although a general classification of various kinds of oratory predated Aristotle, earlier writers did not provide a conceptual basis for them. Aristotle in his treatise On Rhetoric describes three kinds of rhetoric, based on the kinds of audience; deliberative rhetoric concerning decisions about the future, judicial (or forensic) rhetoric concerning decisions about the past, and ceremonial or epideictic rhetoric concerning decisions about the present. Each genre has a characteristic goal, context, and arguments. This delineation of rhetorical genres persisted into the medieval and early modern educational traditions, being codified in the work of the Roman orator Cicero, the pedagogue Quintilian, in the influential Rhetorica ad Herennium, and elsewhere. Thus genre became a static, essentialized, and formalized notion, entrenched in later appropriations of the classic tradition in both rhetoric and poetics.

After the fall of Rome, when the scholastic system took over literary criticism and rhetoric, genre theory was still based on the essential nature of genres. This is most likely because of Christianity's affinity for Platonic concepts. This state of affairs persisted until the 18th century.

=== Enlightenment age ===
At the end of the 18th century, the theory of genre based on classical thought began to unravel beneath the intellectual chafing of the Enlightenment. The introduction of the printing press brought texts to a larger audience. Then pamphlets and broadsides began to diffuse information even farther, and a greater number of less privileged members of society became literate and began to express their views. Suddenly authors of both "high" and "low" culture were now competing for the same audience. This worked to destabilize the classical notions of genre, while still drawing attention to genre because new genres like the novel were being generated (Prince, 455).

Locke, in An Essay Concerning Human Understanding (1690), had reduced data to its smallest part: the simple idea derived from sense. However, as the science of cognition became more precise it was shown that even this simple idea derived from sense was itself divisible. This new information prompted David Hartley to write in his Observation on Man (1749),

How far the Number of Orders may go is impossible to say. I see no Contradiction in supposing it infinite, and a great Difficulty in stopping at any particular Size. (Prince, 456).

The possibility of an infinite number of types alarmed theologians of the time because their assumption was that rigorously applied empiricism would uncover the underlying divine nature of creation, and now it appeared that rigorously applied empiricism would only uncover an ever-growing number of types and subsequent sub-types.

In order to re-establish the divine in categorization, the new taxonomical system of aesthetics arose. This system offered first beauty, and then the sublime as the taxonomical device. The problem with Aesthetics was that it assumed the divine and thus the sublime must underlie all these categories, and thus, the ugly would become beautiful at some point. The paradox is glaring.

=== 19th and 20th centuries ===
American rhetorical education in the early 19th century was dominated by Hugh Blair's belletrism, emphasizing five common forms (letters, treatises, essays, biographies and fiction), and in the later 19th century by what became known as the modes of discourse," based on eighteenth century faculty psychology and codified as narration, description, exposition, and argument (sometimes called persuasion). These formalized and context-free categories were codified in textbooks and influential in the teaching of writing through the middle of the twentieth century.

in 1925 neo-Aristotelian speech criticism inaugurated by Herbert Wichelns in 1925 revived Aristotelian rhetorical genres and codified them in the teaching of new departments of speech communication. Edwin Black identified the classification of rhetoric into forensic, deliberative, and epideictic genres as first among the "primary and identifying ideas of neo-Aristotelianism." Black's critique of neo-Aristotelianism enabled Karlyn Kohrs Cambell and Kathleen Jamieson's turn toward a situation-based, historically-developmental conception of genres.

=== Evolution ===
Ever since the late 18th century literary critics have been trying to find a theory of genre that would be more commensurate with the realities of individual texts within genres. The evolution of genre took many twists and turns through the 19th and 20th centuries. It was heavily influenced by the deconstructionist thought and the concept of relativity. In 1980, the instability engendered by these two new modes of thought came to a head in a paper written by Jacques Derrida titled, "The Law of Genre." In the article Derrida first articulates the idea that individual texts participate in rather than belong to certain genres. He does this by demonstrating that the "mark of genre" is not itself a member of a genre or type. Thus, the very characteristic that signifies genre defies classification. However, at the end of this essay, Derrida hints at what might be a more fruitful direction for genre theory. "There, that is the whole of it, it is only what 'I,' so that say, here kneeling at the edge of literature, can see. In sum, the law. The law summoning: what 'I' can sight and what 'I' can say that I sight in this site of a recitation where I/we is." By which Derrida means that not only is taxonomy a subjective sport, but due to this very fact, the place and time the taxonomical act takes place deserves further study.

Then, in 1986, Ralph Cohen published a paper in response to Derrida's thoughts titled "History and Genre." In this article Cohen argued that

genre concepts in theory and in practice arise, change, and decline for historical reasons. And since each genre is composed of texts that accrue, the grouping is a process, not a determinate category. Genres are open categories. Each member alters the genre by adding, contradicting, or changing constituents, especially those of members most closely related to it. The process by which genres are established always involves the human need for distinction and interrelation. Since the purposes of critics who establish genres vary, it is self-evident that the same texts can belong to different groupings of genres and serve different generic purposes. (Cohen, 204)

==== Genre evolution in RGS ====
RGS scholars largely agree that while genres are indeed dynamic and constantly evolving entities, they are difficult to change. Amy Devitt describes this bind, as she considers a genre to be "both the product and the process that creates it" (580). To Devitt, genres not only respond to recurrent situations, but they construct them as well. Berkenkotter and Huckin note that "Genres...are always sites of contention between stability and change. They are inherently dynamic, constantly (if gradually) changing over time in response to the sociocognitive needs of individual users." This phenomenon makes theorizing genre evolution challenging. Carolyn R. Miller has explored the implications for genre change of the language of "evolution" and "emergence." Many RGS scholars have theorized how genres change. JoAnne Yates and Wanda Orlikowski, who introduced the importance of genre to the organizational studies and information technology fields, embedding it in structuration theory, assert that "one person cannot single-handedly effect the change of an institutionalized structure [like genre]; other relevant participants must adopt and reinforce the attempted change for it to be implemented and sustained in practice" (108). Elsewhere they argue that "the potential for genre modification is inherent in every act of communication," but that only "significant and persistent modifications of genre rules that are widely adopted result in modified genre." In other work, they examine how the structuring of genre systems can be strategically used to organize interaction and influence response timing in electronic interchange. Natasha Artemeva has made similar observations based on an eight-year ethnographic survey that followed engineering students from academia and into the workplace environment. Although Artemeva observed that two of her subjects impacted the evolution of workplace genres when a kairotic moment presented itself (164) these former student's success in changing the workplace genre also depended on three individually acquired skills: 1) "cultural capital", 2) "domain content expertise", and 3) "agency in the rhetor's ability" to not only see when a kairotic moment presented itself, but "to also seize the opportunity" (167). Thomas Helscher is not as optimistic; he writes, the "rhetorical constitution of [a] discourse community operates as a counterweight to the process of community growth and change" (30) and argues that the "transformation of the fundamental generic conventions by which communities constitutes themselves...is paradigmatic of the process of social transformation" (32).

== The problem of genre taxonomy ==
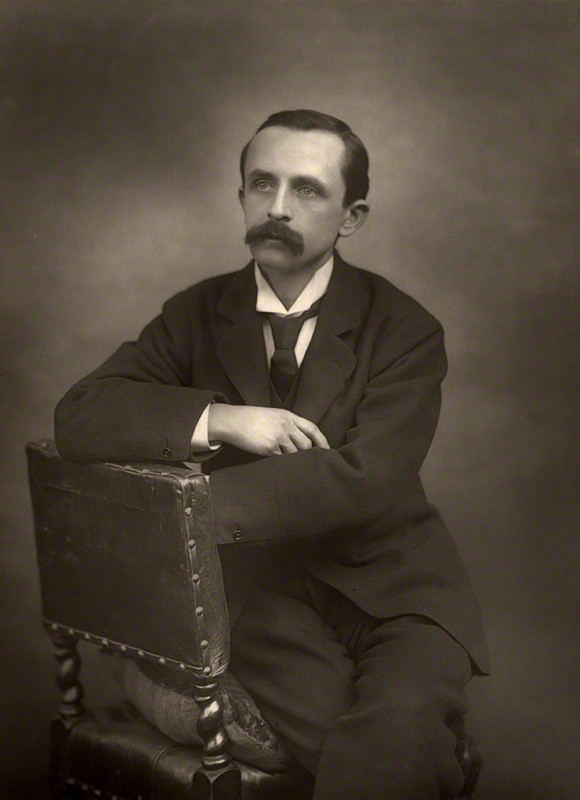
J. M. Barrie's works were notoriously hard to place in any single genre.

The definition of genre from dictionary.com is "a class or category of artistic endeavor having a particular form, context, technique, or the like." Such a definition seems to invite a fixed taxonomy of enduring categories; however, understanding genre attribution as a process recognizes that genre categories are mutable and evolving, and thus are only quasi-stable.

Genres, according to Daniel Chandler, create order to simplify the mass of available information. Creating categories promotes organization instead of chaos. Jane Feuer has divided ways to categorize genres into three different groups. The first is aesthetic. By using this method one can organize according to certain sets of characteristics, and so the overall work of the artist is not disparaged by generalization. The second classification method is ritual. Ritual uses its own culture to help classify. If one performs a ritual associated with a system of ritual, one can be said to be practicing as a member of that system. The common taxonomic method is ideological. This occurs most often in the marketing of texts, music, and movies. The effectiveness of this type of categorization can be measured by how well the public accepts these categories as valid.

Amy J. Devitt focuses on the rhetorical approach to genre. Scholars generally recognize the restrictions placed on works that have been classified as a certain genre. However, viewing genre as a rhetorical device gives the author and the reader more freedom and "allows for choices." Genres are not free-standing entities, but are actually intimately connected and interactive amongst themselves and the activities carried out by those among whom the genres circulate, leading to pervasive change and hybridity. Rhetorical theory of genre recognizes that genres are generated by authors, readers, publishers, and the entire array of social forces that act upon a work at every stage of its production. Consequently rhetorical genre scholars tend to focus on the processes of genre production and change rather than taxonomies of genre that are mutable and subject to the changing interests and perceptions of users within evolving social circumstances.

This recognition of the mutability and fluidity does not make the taxonomy of texts easy. Chandler points out that very few works have all the characteristics of the genre in which they participate. Also, due to the interrelatedness of genres, none of them is clearly defined at the edges, but rather fade into one another. Genre works to promote organization, but there is no absolute way to classify works, and thus genre is still problematic and its theory still evolving.

Moreover, the metagenre as a concept has been an important point to study. According to Giltrow, metagenre is "situated language about situated language". Metagenres such as institutional guidelines can be "ruling out certain kinds of expression, endorsing others", constraining and enabling. The concept of metagenre also provides a valuable way to understand the dynamics of institutional interrelations between genres. In the mental health discourse, for example, has been demonstrated the metageneric function of the American Psychiatric Association's (DSM) for standardizing and mediating the localized epistemological communicative practices of psychiatrists.

== Functions and limits ==
Genre began as an absolute classification system in ancient Greece. Poetry, prose and performance had a specific and calculated style that related to the theme of the story. Speech patterns for comedy would not be appropriate for tragedy, and even actors were restricted to their genre under the assumption that a type of person could tell one type of story best. This classical system worked well as long as the arts were largely directed by nobility and rich patrons. A common understanding of meaning was handy in knowing what the employer expected, and the crowds understood it.

During the Enlightenment period in 18th century Europe, this system of patronage began to change. A merchant middle class began to emerge with money to spend and time to spend it. Artists could venture away from classical genres and try new ways to attract paying patrons. "Comedy" could now mean Greek metered comedy, or physical camp, or some other type of experience. Artists were also free to use their mediums to express the human condition in a way that was not possible under single patronage, or at least not profitable. Art could be used to reflect and comment on the lives of ordinary people. Genre became a dynamic tool to help the public make sense out of unpredictable art. Because art is often a response to a social state, in that people write/paint/sing/dance about what they know about, the use of genre as a tool must be able to adapt to changing meanings. In fact, as far back as ancient Greece, new art forms were emerging that called for the evolution of genre, for example the "tragicomedy."

Unfortunately, genre does have its limitations. Our world has grown so much that it is difficult to absolutely classify something. Information overlaps, and a single book can encompass elements of several genres. For example, a book might be classified as fiction, mystery, science fiction and African American literature all at once.

Genre suffers from the same ills of any classification system. Humans are pattern-seeking beings; we like to create order out of the chaos of the universe. However, when we forget that our order is imposed, often arbitrarily, over a universe of unique experiences, the merit of the individual gets lost. If a system of classification, like genre, is then used to assign value judgments, we allow our preconceptions about the whole to influence our opinion of the individual. Genre is useful as long as we remember that it is a helpful tool, to be reassessed and scrutinized, and to weigh works on their unique merit as well as their place within the genre.

A simple example of the inherent meaning in an art form is that of a western movie where two men face each other on a dusty and empty road; one wears a black hat, the other white. Independent of any external meaning, there is no way to tell what the situation might mean, but due to the long development of the "western" genre, it is clear to the informed audience that they are watching a gunfight showdown between a bad guy and a good guy.

It has been suggested that genres resonate with people because of the familiarity, the shorthand communication, as well as the tendency of genres to shift with public mores and to reflect the zeitgeist. While the genre of storytelling has been relegated as lesser form of art because of the heavily borrowed nature of the conventions, admiration has grown. Proponents argue that the genius of an effective genre piece is in the variation, recombination, and evolution of the codes.

Genre studies have perhaps gained the most recognition in film theory, where the study of genre directly contrasts with auteur theory, which privileges the director's role in crafting a movie.

== In social communities ==
There is something more about genre theory, and to that effect it is necessary to propose Kristen H. Perry's definition. Written (textual) genres are social constructions that represent specific purposes for reading and writing within different social activities, created by social groups who need them to perform certain things. They change over time, reflecting essential shifts in social function performed by that text. Genres also represent constellations of textual attributes: some attributes are necessary and other attributes are optional.

Another definition which shows the different aspects of genre theory is Miller who defines genres as "typified rhetorical actions" that respond to recurring situations and become instantiated in groups' behaviors. Genre evolves as "a form of social knowledge—a mutual construing of objects, events, interests and purposes that not only links them but makes them what they are: an objectified social need". This view sees genres not as static forms but, rather, as "forms of ways of being ... frames for social action ... environments for learning ... locations within which meaning is constructed" (Bazerman), suggesting that different communities use different means of communication to accomplish their objectives.

To try to show the importance of the context in genre an example is used about a particular part of the genre theory—speech genres; but it is important to stress that context is really important in all situations. Context plays an important role in shaping genres (Holquist, 1986). Genre theory does not conceptualize context as simply the space outside of text or the container surrounding texts, but as dynamic environments that simultaneously structure and are structured by the communicative practices of social agents. Speech genres are recognizable patterns of language-in-context (Bakhtin, 1986): speech genres include both oral and written forms of language.

Researchers have also shown that the rhetorical moves people must make within accepted genres to communicate successfully in particular contexts operate to reinforce communities' identities and to legitimate particular communication practices. Thus, the genres that communities enact help structure their members' ways of creating, interpreting, and using knowledge (Myers; Winsor, Ordering, Writing; Bazerman, Shaping, Constructing; Berkenkotter and Huckin; Smart). Genres are very important in our everyday life and we do not realize how much we use them, how much they affect us, or how much they determine the way we act and understand the others.

== Aspects of genre theory ==
=== Rhetorical situation ===
A rhetorical situation is a situation that has the potential for modification by the use of discourse. Bitzer states, "it is the situation which calls discourse into existence". Thus, the situation controls what type of rhetorical response takes place. Each situation has an appropriate response in which the rhetor can either fulfill or fail to fulfill. They express the imperative nature of the situation in creating discourse, because discourse only comes into being as a response to a particular situation. Discourse varies depending upon the meaning-context that is created due to the situation, and because of this, it is "embedded in the situation".

According to Bitzer, rhetorical situations come into existence, at which point, they can either mature and be resolved, or mature and persist. Bitzer describes rhetorical situations as containing three components: exigence, audience, and constraints. He highlights six characteristics needed from a rhetorical situation that are necessary to creating discourse. A situation calls a rhetor to create discourse, it invites a response to fit the situation, the response meets the necessary requirements of the situation, the exigence which creates the discourse is located in reality, rhetorical situations exhibit simple or complex structures, rhetorical situations after coming into creation either decline or persist. Bitzer's main argument is the concept that rhetoric is used to "effect valuable changes in reality" (Bitzer 14).

In 1984, Carolyn R. Miller claimed that "situations are social constructs that are the result, not of 'perception, but of 'definition'". In other words, we essentially define as social recognitions. Although Bitzer never considers genre, Miller believes genres are created through social construction of perceived recurrence. Miller holds that, rhetorically, genre should be "centered not on the substance or the form of discourse but on the action it is used to accomplish". Since her view focuses on action, it cannot ignore that humans depend on the "context of the situation" as well as "motives" that drive them to action. Essentially, "we create recurrence," or similar responses, through our "construal" of types. Miller defines "types" as "recognition of relevant similarities". The way to bring about a new "type", is to allow for past routines to evolve into new routines, thereby maintaining a cycle that is always open for change.

=== Antecedent genres ===
Written in 1975, Kathleen Hall Jamieson's "Antecedent Genre as Rhetorical Constraint" declares that discourse is determined by the Rhetorical Situation, as well as antecedent genres. Antecedent genres are genres of the past that are used as a basis to shape and form current rhetorical responses. When placed in an unprecedented situation, a rhetor can draw on antecedent genres of similar situations in order to guide their response. However, caution should be taken when drawing on antecedent genres because sometimes antecedent genres are capable of imposing powerful constraints. The intent of antecedent genres are to guide the rhetor toward a response consistent with situational demands, and if the situational demands are not the same as when the antecedent genre was created, the response to the situation might be inappropriate.

Through three examples of discourse, the papal encyclical, the early State of the Union Address, and congressional replies, she demonstrates how traces of antecedent genres can be found within each. These examples clarify how a rhetor will tend to draw from past experiences that are similar to the present situation in order to guide them how to act or respond when they are placed in an unprecedented situation. Jamieson explains, by use of these three examples, that choices of antecedent genre may not always be appropriate to the present situation. She discusses how antecedent genres place powerful constraints on the rhetor and may cause them to become "bound by the manacles of the antecedent genre". These "manacles," she says, may range in level of difficulty to escape. Jamieson urges one to be careful when drawing on the past to respond to the present, because of the consequences that may follow ones choice of antecedent genre. She reiterates the intended outcome through her statement of "choice of an appropriate antecedent genre guides the rhetor toward a response consonant with situational demands".

=== Reciprocity of genre ===
People often recognize genre based on the characteristics that the situation offers. Amy Devitt states this when she says, "A genre is named because of its formal markers" (Devitt 10). However she also says, "the formal markers can be defined because a genre has been named" (Devitt 10). When we label something as a certain genre, we also flag these same characteristics as contributing to what we already believe the genre to be. These two quotes show how reciprocity functions within genre. Devitt displays the reciprocal nature of genre and situation according to the individual by using an example of a grocery store list. A question posed by this example is, is something a grocery list because it lists groceries or is it a grocery list because one person says it is a grocery list and we thus recognize all the items on the list as groceries? Though each possible answer to this raised question contradict one another, they are both correct. Similarly, individuals recognize the characteristics of the recurring rhetorical situations in the same way as they see them as affirmation of what they already know about the preexisting genre. The rhetorical attributes of the genre act as both objects which define and are defined by genre. In other words, genre and rhetorical situations are reciprocals of one another. Devitt focused on activity system of genre and that the participants' situation, contexts and text are all mutually created "no one aspect fully determines the other." (Devitt)

=== Tyranny of genre ===
The phrase "tyranny of genre" comes from genre theorist Richard Coe, who wrote that "the 'tyranny of genre' is normally taken to signify how generic structures constrain individual creativity" (Coe 188). If genre functions as a taxonomic classification system, it could constrain individual creativity, since "the presence of many of the conventional features of a genre will allow a strong genre identification; the presence of fewer features, or the presence of features of other genres, will result in a weak or ambiguous genre identification" (Schauber 403).

Genres can act as constraints on readers as well. Literary historian Hans Robert Jauss describes genres as creating a "horizon of expectation" under which readers will interpret texts based on how much they correspond to the features of the genre they recognize from works they have previously read. The classification-system concept results in a polarization of responses to texts that do not fit neatly into a genre or exhibit features of multiple genres: "The status of genres as discursive institutions does create constraints that may make a text that combines or mixes genres appear to be a cultural monstrosity. Such a text may be attacked or even made a scapegoat by some as well as be defended by others" (LaCapra 220).

Under the more modern understanding of the concept of genre as "social action" à la Miller, a more situational approach to genre is enabled. This situational approach frees genre from the classification system, genre's "tyranny of genre". Relying on the importance of the rhetorical situation in the concept of genre results in an exponential expansion of genre study, which benefits literary analysis. One literature professor writes, "The use of the contemporary, revised genre idea [as social action] is a breath of fresh air, and it has opened important doors in language and literature pedagogy" (Bleich 130). Instead of a codified classification as the pragmatic application of genre, the new genre idea insists that "human agents not only have the creative capacities to reproduce past action, such as action embedded in genres, but also can respond to changes in their environment, and in turn change that environment, to produce under-determined and possibly unprecedented action, such as by modifying genres" (Killoran 72).

=== Stabilization, homogenization and fixity ===
Never is there total stabilization in a recognized genre, nor are there instances that indicate a complete lack of homogenization. However, because of the relative similarities between the terms "stabilization" and "homogenization", the amount of stabilization or homogenization a certain genre maintains is based on opinion. Necessary discourse is, obviously, always needed and is thus considered perfectly stabilized. In rhetorical situation or antecedent genres, that which is unprecedented mostly leads to stable and predictable responses. Outside the natural setting of a given form of discourse, one may respond inappropriately due to an unrecognized alternate. The unrecognized alternate is created by the lack of homogenization or differing expectations in the presented rhetorical situation.

Fixity is uncontrolled by a given situation and is deliberately utilized by the affected before the rhetorical situation occurs. Fixity almost always directly effects stabilization, and has little to no bearing on homogenization. The choice of discourse will provide a certain value of fixity, depending on the specific choice. If a situation calls for more mediated responses, the fixity of the situation is more prevalent, and therefore is attributed with a stable demand of expectations. Stability nor fixity can be directly affected by the subject at hand. The only option is affecting homogenization which in turn, can positively or negatively affect stability. Directly choosing a fixed arena within genre inversely alters the homogenization of said chooser constituting as a new genre accompanied with modified genre subsets and a newly desired urgency. The same ideological theory can be applied to how one serves different purposes, creating either separate genres or modernized micro-genres. (Fairclough)

=== Genre ecology and activity theory ===
Activity theory is not grounded in any one area of field of research, but instead draws from several disciplines including psychology, behaviorism, and socio-cultural studies. Although activity theory originated in the social sciences, it is currently applied most frequently to social-scientific, organizational, and writing studies. Modeled as a triangle, activity theory considers how multiple factors (subject, object, mediating artifacts, rules, and division of labor) existing in an activity system (environment) interact to achieve an outcome. Central to activity theory is the concept of mediation. Human activities are driven by a need to achieve a certain outcome or goal. Typically this activity is mediated by artifacts which include tools, language, signs, and cultural norms. In "Textual Objects" Cheryl Geisler explains that texts are traditionally identified as meditational means to complete a task, though she offers that texts might also be identified as the motive in discourse communities in which text is valued as the outcome as opposed to the means of an outcome. Geisler notes that texts produced for meditational means are typically more private/personalized, whereas texts identified as objects are often written with a public motive. She does not argue, however, that texts should exist exclusively as one or the other, but rather she suggests that texts can function as both.

For some genre theorists, such as Clay Spinuzzi, genres are tools-in-use, and as such can be seen as mediating objects within the world. This view of genre as a tool-in-use is exemplified in the school of genre theory that studies genres' relationships to activity systems. In his article "Textual Grounding: How People Turn Texts into Tools," Jason Swarts asserts that users utilize texts as tools when they recognize the text's specific value in a rhetorical situation or environment. User's then "ground" texts, altering the texts structure for personal use, to make them usable under very specific conditions. The user takes the text from a "formalized representation of information" to a personal tool. Swarts argues that the meaning of a text is established by uptake of the users, though this varies depending on the user and the user's goal. Similarly, in Tracing Genres Through Organizations: A Sociocultural Approach to Information Design, Clay Spinuzzi asserts that the use of certain tools in certain situations can help users to act purposefully in that activity. Within this tradition of genre studies, "Genres are not discrete artifacts, but traditions of producing, using, and interpreting artifacts, traditions that make their way into the artifact as a form-shaping ideology." The study of genres as mediating artifacts within activity systems is closely related to Activity Theory, in which the interactions of different spheres of activity are examined. Activity theory, according to David Russell, "traces cognition and behavior, including writing, to social interaction." Activity theorists examine the ways that the work done in one sphere of activity could potentially change the work done in another. For example, Russell examines how people use writing to mediate their activities, and how changes in one activity can lead to changes in another activity. Russell points out that "the activity system of cell biology research is not confined to universities. It also extends into boundary activity systems of drug companies, government medical research facilities, and so on." Subtle changes in the use of writing in one activity can effect changes in the use of writing in related systems. If the government sets down new pharmaceutical documentation laws, then the teaching of how to document the distribution of pharmaceuticals will change, not just in pharmacies, but also in hospitals and nursing classrooms. Activity systems are always in flux, because subtle changes in one level of the system result in subtle changes in other levels of the system. Activity systems are still relatively stable, despite their constant flux. The changes within them are often subtle, and large scale changes usually occur over long periods of time.

Genre ecology describes the dense connections between genres within the activities that they mediate. Multiple genres mediate a single activity; no genre exists in isolation. In "The Ecology of Genre" Anis Bawarshi argues that genres are "rhetorical ecosystems" in which participants actively enact and, consequently, reenact social practices, relations, and identities. Participants use genre to interpret and perform social motives which sustain rhetorical ecosystems that produce social contexts, practices, and identities. For Spinuzzi, and other genre theorists studying the social aspects of genre (like Carolyn R. Miller, Amy Devitt, and Kathleen Jamieson, among others), genre is more than a category or artifact; genre is a way of interacting with the world. In the study of genre ecologies, genre is seen as a way people can accomplish activities. Like activity systems, genre ecologies are not entirely stable, because activities change, causing the genres mediating them to change, as well. Take, for example the digitization of the workplace. Before computers, the workspace was largely mediated by genres such as the paper memo, or the company newsletter. After digitization, paper memos and paper newsletters began to disappear. Memos and newsletters did not disappear; instead, their distribution method changed. Now, memos and newsletters are disseminated electronically in emails. The genres of the memo and newsletter still exists, but they have changed, slightly, to reflect the changes in the activity system that they mediate.

=== Secondary speech genres ===
Analyzing the interaction between multiple, competing voices and registers in literary works, Mikhail Bakhtin argued that complex, secondary speech genres are constituted by simple, primary speech genres. Bakhtin defined complex, secondary speech genres as "novels, dramas, all kinds of scientific research, major genres of commentary, and so forth [that] arise in more complex and comparatively highly developed and organized cultural communication" (62). While Bakhtin focused on the historical emergence of the novel in much of his work, in "The Problem of Speech Genres" he claimed that his theory applied to all literary genres, including "profoundly individual lyrical work[s]" (61) such as the pastoral elegy. Complex, secondary speech genres form when they "absorb and digest various primary (simple) genres that have taken form in unmediated speech communion" (62). Primary speech genres are "short rejoinders of daily dialogue," "everyday narration," "brief standard military command" (60), "verbal signals in industry" (63), "letters, diaries, minutes, and so forth" (98), notable for their referentiality to and function within the pragmatic communicative contexts of "extraverbal reality (situation)" (83). When primary speech genres are absorbed by secondary ones, according to Bakhtin, they are "altered and assume a special character," losing "their immediate relation to actual reality and to the real utterances of others" (62). This process of absorption and digestion of primary speech genres by secondary ones leads to a "more or less distinct dialogization of secondary genres, the weakening of their monological composition" (66). It is unclear, however, how this distinction between primary and secondary genres would apply in such quotidian comments as "I don't trust Joe's opinion, he has such a strange way of looking at things" or "Mary forwarded that recipe from the vegan website, so you need to be into that stuff to try it." While Bakhtinian dialogization may weaken the monological composition of secondary speech genres, it does not preclude a dominant theme, ideology, or cultural meaning from arising out of interplay of the "various transformed primary genres" (98) that make up a secondary work (although, Bakhtin admitted, this dominant ideology is difficult to isolate in complex works, and is, to a certain extent, left open to the interpretation of individual readers). In Bakhtin's view, primary genres undergo a more or less thorough process of contestation and resolution within the secondary work they constitute and "enter into actual reality only via the [work] as a whole, that is, as a literary-artistic event and not as everyday life" (62). "As a rule, these secondary genres of complex cultural communication play out various forms of primary speech communication" (Bakhtin 98). Even as a work permits and enacts dialogization between characters, conventional forms, and semantic content, it resolves or "finalizes" that content into a "wholeness" of utterance, which is intelligible to readers, and therefore "guarantee[s] the possibility of response (or of responsive understanding)" (76). Through the finalization of disparate conventional and thematic strands, a work achieves the fullness of what Bakhtin called its "specific authorial intent," Milton's "speech plan" or "speech will" for his work, and readies itself for responsive understanding (reception, interpretation) on the part of readers (77). Despite its internal dialogization, the work delivers itself to readers as a semantically exhaustive whole, and in this way uses its internal drama to respond ideologically to its genre: "other works connected with it in the overall processes of speech communication in [its] particular cultural sphere" (75). These include "works of predecessors on whom the author relies," "other works of the same school," and "works of opposing schools with which the author is contending" (75). In this way the work forms a crucial "link the chain of speech communion" of its genre (76).

== See also ==
- Computer and video game genres
- Film genre
- Formula fiction
- Genre fiction
- Literary genre
- Music genre
- Plot device
- Stock character
- Genre criticism
