= Genre criticism =

Submethod of Rhetorical Cricitism

Genre criticism is a method within rhetorical criticism that analyzes texts in terms of their genre: the set of generic expectations, conventions, and constraints that guide their production and interpretation. In rhetoric, the theory of genre provides a means to classify and compare artifacts in terms of their formal, substantive and contextual features. By grouping artifacts with others which have similar formal features or rhetorical exigencies, rhetorical critics can shed light on how authors use or flout conventions for their own purposes. Genre criticism has thus become one of the main methodologies within rhetorical criticism.

Literary critics have used the concepts of genres to classify speeches and works of literature since the time of Aristotle, who distinguished three rhetorical genres: the legal or judicial, the deliberative or political, and the ceremonial or epideictic. Since then, rhetorical approaches to genre and understanding of the term "genre" have evolved in several ways. New genres have been studied for their rhetorical effectiveness - like sermons, letters, and (more recently) non-verbal genres like political cartoons, film, and public monuments. Further contemporary genre criticism has revised understanding of genre in several ways. The first 'turn', represented by Mikhail Mikhailovich Bakhtin (1895-1975), among others, focused on the formal features of communication. The second, represented by Carolyn Miller, among others, focused on recurring socio-cultural circumstances. In the latest turn, critics have begun applying formalist and socio-cultural concepts to new-media artifacts that tend to resist classification into traditional genre-categories.

== Emphasis on formal features in speech genres ==
The first group of rhetorical critics, following the example of theorists like M. M. Bakhtin, used formal features to analyze texts. For these critics, language is formed through a series of utterances that reflect specific conditions and goals of certain linguistic aspects. These aspects include thematic content, style, and compositional structure which form speech genres. Speech genres are diverse because of the various possibilities of human activity. In "The Problem of Speech Genres" (1986), Mikhail Bakhtin draws attention to the very significant difference between primary (simple) and secondary (complex) speech genres. According to Bahktin, primary speech genres form secondary speech genres and examples of secondary speech genres include novels, dramas, all kinds of scientific research, and major genres of commentary. Since these secondary genres involve complex and comparatively highly developed and organized cultural communication that is artistic and scientific, they absorb and digest various primary genres that have taken form in mediated speech communion. Bakhtin continues to explain that there are three factors of the whole utterance which include semantic exhaustiveness of the theme, the speaker's plan or speech will, and the typical compositional and generic forms of finalization. The first factor refers to the way utterances are used within speech which is linked to the second factor of how the speaker determines to use the utterance.The third factor explains that all our utterances have definite and stable typical forms of construction, but that these forms can change when needed. As Bahktin writes, "These genres are so diverse because they differ depending on the situation, social position, and personal interrelations of the participants in the communication".

== Rhetorical approaches to genre ==
The word “genre” is derived from the Latin term genus, to mean “kind”, “class” or "sort".

Aristotle was one of the first scholars to develop a rhetorical approach to genre. He divided the art of rhetoric into three genres: deliberative, forensic, and epideictic. The deliberative genre of rhetoric involves speeches or writing meant to persuade an audience to take action. Deliberative rhetoric thus includes rhetoric that is used for political persuasion, discusses matters of public policy in order to determine what is advantageous or disadvantageous, and is usually concerned with the future. Rhetoric of the forensic genre questions guilt or innocence, is concerned with legalities, and concentrates on events that occurred in the past. The epideictic genre of rhetoric encompasses all rhetoric used for ceremonial and commemorative purposes. Epideictic rhetoric praises and blames, acknowledging that which is noble or shameful, honorable or dishonorable.

The rhetorical situation is a concept important for understanding rhetorical approaches to genre and the creation of new genres. Campaign speeches are an example of how rhetorical situations recur, producing sedimented genres. As a result of the institutions that execute the U.S. Constitution, every four years at the time of presidential elections, candidates deliver campaign speeches. Campaign speeches have become a distinct genre because they respond to highly similar situations that recur because of a structural or institutional basis.

U.S. rhetoricians Karlyn Kohrs Campbell and Kathleen Hall Jamieson refer to genre as a “constellation of elements." They say, “A genre is a group of acts unified by a constellation of forms that recurs in each of its members.” Genres are formed when examined constituents are similar. The metaphors of genres as “constellations” serves to explain how genres, like constellations of stars, are constructed of individual members, but are under the influence of each other and outside elements. As a result, they move together and remain in a similar relation to each other despite their ever-changing positions. According to Campbell and Jamieson, “when a generic claim is made, the critical situation alters significantly because the critic is now arguing that a group of discourses has a synthetic core in which certain significant rhetorical elements, e.g., a system of belief, lines of argument, stylistic choices, and the perception of the situation, are fused into an indivisible whole".

Many contemporary scholars refer to the fusion of traits from different genres in speeches and texts as a "generic hybrid". These generic hybrids can be formed from a blend of the three rhetorical genres. This concept can be explained through an example of a generic hybrid of deliberative and epideictic elements, in which a newly elected president delivers an inaugural address. The President is speaking at a formal ceremony recognizing the current state of the nation (characteristic of the epideictic genre), while simultaneously announcing his policy plans for the upcoming four years.

U.S. rhetorician Carolyn R. Miller is the author of the article "Genre as Social Action" (1984). She argues, “Rhetorical criticism has not provided firm guidance on what constitutes a genre” and a “rhetorically sound definition of genre must be centered not on the substance or the form of discourse but on the action it is used to accomplish.” Miller also argues that new media genres may develop and formalize more quickly than traditional, written genres. She is among other rhetoricians who have expressed concerns about the appropriateness of traditional genre theory for new media communication. They argue that because genre theory originally was developed for describing written texts, the theory should be modified to account for nonlinguistic communication. Miller and colleague Dawn Shepherd illustrate an example of applying socio-cultural theories to genre studies in "Blogging as Social Action: A Genre Analysis of the Weblog". They explain how the weblog may be establishing a new genre because of its integration of current social and cultural trends.

== Socio-cultural approach to genre studies ==
In the 1980s, scholarship in genre theory and criticism has turned towards a socio-cultural approach to the study of genre by actively interrogating the rhetorical situation of a given communication artifact in light of its particular generic form. In this mode of inquiry, the rhetorical artifact is examined as a social response to a set of recurrent rhetorical exigencies rather than a collection of formal, generic elements. In the rhetorical tradition of genre criticism, Carolyn R. Miller's work on the socio-cultural approach to genre theory has been influential. Again in her 1984 journal article, Miller argues that “rhetorical criticism has not provided firm guidance on what constitutes a genre” and that a “rhetorically sound definition of genre must be centered not on the substance or the form of discourse but on the action it is used to accomplish”. Later, when Miller and Shepherd engaged the socio-cultural approach to genre criticism in “Blogging as Social Action: A Genre Analysis of the Weblog” (2004), they exposed some of the difficulties of applying genre theory to new media. In their analysis, Miller and Shepherd examine the extent to which the weblog might constitute a genre in light of its interaction with current social and cultural trends.

== Genre studies in new media ==
Recently scholars and researchers in rhetoric, linguistics, and information sciences have begun to explore the relationships between new media and socio-contextual genre theories (like those of Carolyn Miller, Mikhail Bakhtin, and Charles Bazerman). These researchers have expressed concerns about the appropriateness of traditional genre theory for new media communication. Some scholars have argued that since genre theory was originally developed to describe written texts, the theory needs to be modified to account for nonlinguistic communication. Linguist and semiotician Gunter Kress suggested that much of the vocabulary of generic analysis is ill-equipped to address non-written communication, arguing that “there are no genre terms for describing what [a] drawing is or does…” Similarly, rhetoricians Miller and Shepherd have argued that traditional written genre theory does not appropriately address the visual features of a genre's format.

Rhetoricians and information scientists have also pointed out that new media genres may develop and formalize more quickly than traditional written genres. The authors of the article "Genres and the web" argue that the personal home page is functioning as a new and discrete genre, and they explore the entirely digital nature of home pages, suggesting that home pages “have no obvious paper equivalent”. Additionally recent work in new media genre theory has explored how new communication technologies allows for forms of “genre hybridity.” Spinuzzi, for example, explores what can happen when multiple related genres are remediated into a single new media artifact.

== See also ==
- Genre Studies
- Form Criticism

== Sources ==
- Crowston, K. & Williams, M. (2000). Reproduced and Emergent Genres of Communication on the World Wide Web. The Information Society 16, pp. 201–215.
- Jasinski, J.(2001). Genre: Sourcebook on Rhetoric. Thousand Oaks, CA: Sage Publications.
- Kress, G. (2003). Literacy in the New Media Age. London: Routledge.
- Prince, M. B. (2003). "Mauvais genres". New Literary History. 34(3), p. 452.
