= Rhetorical stance =

Rhetorical stance refers to the deliberate choices made by a communicator in shaping and presenting their message. It encompasses the strategic decisions regarding language, style, and tone that are employed to achieve a specific communicative purpose. This concept is deeply rooted in rhetorical theory and is a fundamental aspect of effective communication across various disciplines, including literature, public speaking, and academic writing.

Rhetorical stance is the position or perspective that a writer or speaker adopts to convey a message to an audience.

It involves choices in tone, style, and language to persuade, inform, entertain, or engage the audience. Rhetorical stance can include elements such as the use of ethos (establishing credibility), pathos (appealing to emotions), and logos (logical reasoning) to shape the overall impact of a communication.

== Purpose ==
The application of a rhetorical stance plays a role in refining arguments. Within the realm of rhetorical composition, the persona, audience, and contextual factors form the foundation of persuasive rhetoric.

According to scholars James L. Golden, Goodwin Berquist, and William Coleman, authors and speakers often utilize learned arguments and varied communication skills to effectively convey an intended message. Aristotle stated that the arguments accessible for any given subject are contingent upon the unique circumstances of the rhetorical situation, while Lloyd Bitzer contended that the availability of arguments is shaped by the intricate relationships between the author, audience, context, and purpose of the discourse. Wayne Booth defined rhetoric as "the art of persuasion."

In Booth's perspective, a proficient author or speaker, when adopting a rhetorical stance, harmonizes three fundamental components within their discourse: the speaker, the argument, and the audience. This equilibrium is achieved through the use of a voice that conveys character, the explicit presentation of all pertinent arguments concerning the subject matter, and thoughtful consideration of the audience's distinct characteristics and dispositions. Booth's argument asserts that a speaker who neglects the interplay between themselves and their audience, solely relying on the information they present about the subject, "will produce scholarly essays that lack reader engagement, composed not for an audience but merely for inclusion in bibliographies."

Communicators may choose to include or exclude specific points from their argument or adjust their tone to align with the expectations of their target audience.

== Context ==
Authors strategically position themselves in relation to their audience by considering pertinent contextual elements that impact the communicative situation. Brian Street advocates for an expansive interpretation of "context," encompassing "conceptual systems, political structures, economic processes, and so on," rather than merely focusing on a 'network' or 'interaction'". On the other hand, Stephen Levinson adopts a more specific definition, confining relevant contextual elements to immediate and observable events. Various real-world factors, such as current affairs, politics, natural disasters, religious or social norms, or war, can significantly influence an author's or speaker's perspective.

== The rhetorical triangle and tetrahedron ==
The rhetorical triangle (green) and rhetorical tetrahedron (blue)

Aristotle established the classic triad of ethos, pathos, and logos (the Aristotelian triad of appeals) that serves as the foundation of the rhetorical triangle. The rhetorical triangle evolved from its original, sophisticated model into what rhetorician Sharon Crowley describes as the "postmodern" rhetorical triangle, the rhetorical tetrahedron. The expanded rhetorical triangle now emphasizes context by integrating situational elements.

The original version includes only three points: the writer/speaker (ethos), the audience (pathos), and the message itself (logos). All the points affect one another, so mastering each creates a persuasive rhetorical stance.

The rhetorical tetrahedron carries those three points along with context. Context can help explain the "why" and "how" something is written by introducing the setting in which it was created.

== Audience ==
According to Aristotle and twentieth-century rhetoricians, experienced speakers begin the process of adopting a rhetorical stance with an analysis of the audience. Professional authors and speakers use their knowledge of the subject and establish credibility to help influence how their message is received. Rhetorician George Campbell explained how one can influence their audience by applying argumentative and emotional tones. Aristotle emphasized the consideration of human nature and emotion to achieve an understanding of one’s audience and a relationship necessary for achieving persuasion. According to Kenneth Burke, the author creates this impression by demonstrating an understanding of the audience’s needs and by "substantiating" intellectual and empathetic relationships between oneself and the audience. Following Aristotle's theory, Roman Senator Cicero explained that by adapting to the emotions of the audience, one can be successful in gaining their respect and attention. Similarly, according to Ross Wintered, speakers and authors adjust their rhetorical stance to accommodate a particular audience. When the speaker is talking, they alter their rhetorical stance and use various techniques for different audiences based on the particular situation. There are also several ways in which a speaker or writer can make their audience feel a connection or relation to them. Speakers use anchorage and relay to appeal to their audience. Anchorage uses images to assist the speaker in getting specific points across, while relay uses moving images, such as videos, comic strips, etc. to do the same. A particular pronoun can make the audience feel either included or excluded. If the author says, for example, "All of us Europeans are well traveled," it implies that all of "us" Europeans agree with the fact that "we" are well traveled. However, if a non-European is in the audience, they will not feel a connection to the speaker or author, making them feel very antagonistic.

== Usage ==
Many academic courses incorporate rhetorical stance. Speech and English departments, especially, have implemented this tactic in their educational plans. In speech classes, rhetorical stance is used when the speaker is addressing the audience. Also, a speaker not only takes a rhetorical stance in public addresses, formal arguments, or academic essays but in all communications. Although the bulk of the discussion on rhetorical stance is generally found in academia, a myriad of "other-than-academic communities," such as business, law and politics, journalism and media, and religious institutions utilize and discuss theories of rhetorical stance.
