= Amy J. Devitt =

American academic

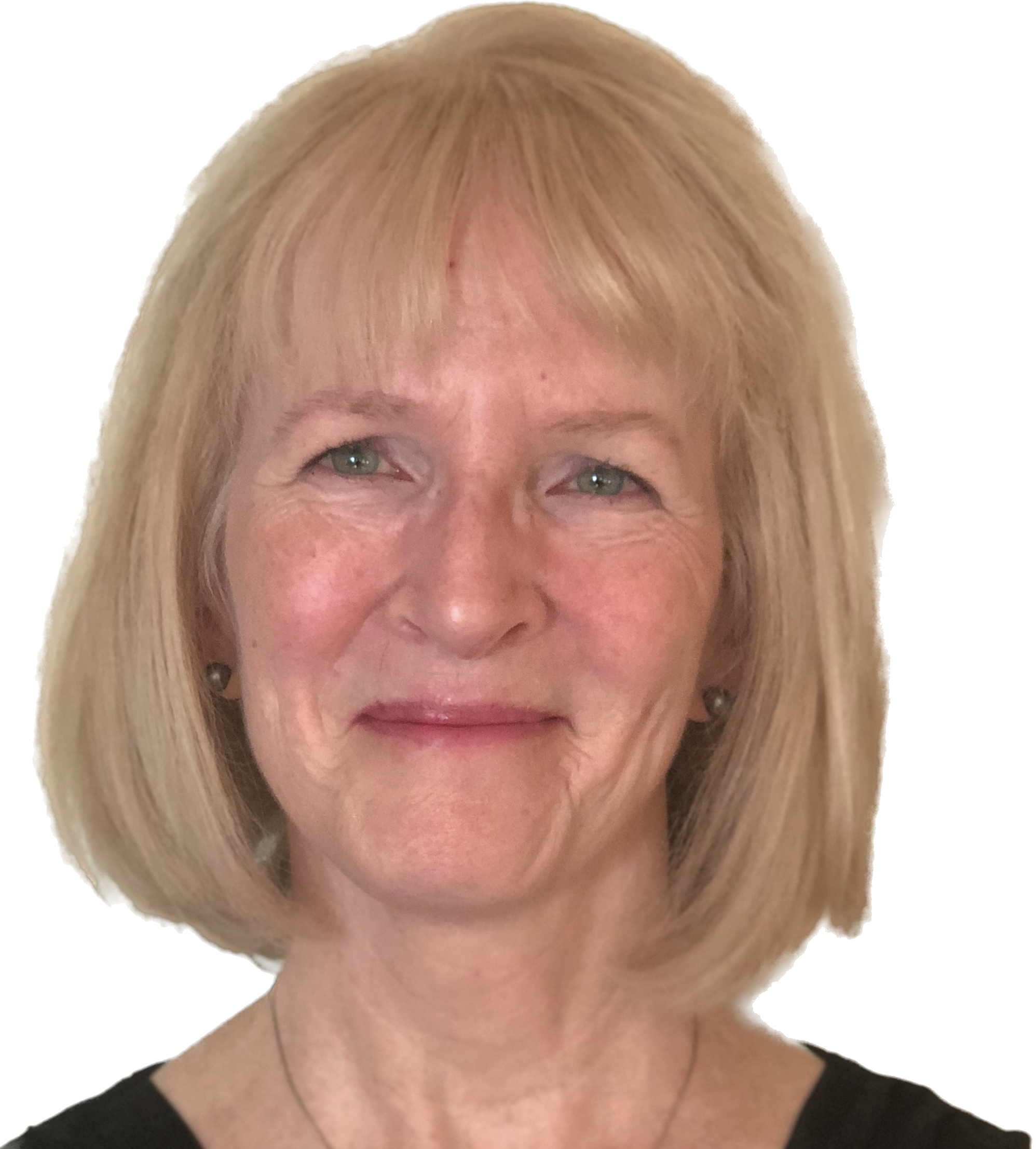
- Born: February 14, 1955 (age 71); Ft. Collins, Colorado, U.S.
- Known for: Genre theory

Academic background
- Education: University of Michigan

Academic work
- Discipline: Genre studies, Composition studies
- Institutions: University of Tulsa, University of Kansas

Amy J. Devitt (born 1955) (Ph.D., University of Michigan, 1982) is an American scholar and educator most known for her work in genre studies, writing pedagogy, and professional writing. She is Professor Emerita of English (retired) at the University of Kansas where she taught since 1985, most notably as Chancellor's Club Teaching Professor (2007-2020), Frances Stiles Teaching Professor (2012-2015), and Conger-Gables Teaching Professor (2001-2004). Her teaching awards also include the first Kemper Teaching Fellow and the Byron A. Alexander Outstanding Graduate Mentor Award. She is the author or coauthor of three books and over 25 academic articles and chapters as well as co-editor (with Carolyn Miller) of the book Landmark Essays on Rhetorical Genre Studies.

== Biography ==
=== Education ===
Devitt earned a B.A. in English from Trinity University (Texas) in 1977, an M.A. in English Literature and Composition from University of Kansas in 1979, and a Ph.D. in English Language and Literature from the University of Michigan in 1982.

=== Teaching and professional experience ===
After graduating from the University of Michigan with a Ph.D in English, Devitt worked as an Assistant Professor of English at the University of Tulsa from 1982-1985. Devitt then joined the English department at the University of Kansas, where she had earned her M.A. in 1985, and taught there until her retirement in 2020.

== Research impact ==
As one of the founders of Rhetorical Genre Studies, Devitt is known as contributing the evolution of genres and the relation to language change, introducing the concept of genre sets, clarifying the reciprocal relationship between formal genre markers and recognition of genre activity, and elaborating the pedagogic implications of genre awareness and antecedent genres. These contributions have been documented by scholars Anis Bawarshi and Mary Jo Reiff and recognized in the substantial citation of her work.

== Professional contributions ==
=== Major publications ===
==== Books ====
Standardizing Written English: Diffusion in the Case of Scotland 1520-1659 (1989), presents a new perspective on the process of linguistic standardization. It demonstrates, through empirical research and theoretical arguments, how language standards spread over time gradually, with significant variation, and at different rates in different genres. Its particular case study is of English written in Scotland in the sixteenth and seventeenth centuries, as the standard was shifting for socio-political reasons from a Scots-English to Anglo-English set of norms. Variation across genres proved as statistically significant as variation across a century and a half, attributable to the contextual variables underlying different genres. Standardization proves a gradual and highly variable process influenced by social and political contexts.

Writing Genres (2004) offers a comprehensive view of genre as a rhetorical concept and as an influence on what and how people write. Drawing from rhetorical, linguistic, and literary research and scholarship, chapters explore genre in its social settings and contexts, how genres change, genre norms and creativity, literary genres, and ways of teaching genres through genre awareness and antecedent genres. It argues for a fuller understanding of genre as context as well as form, offering insights into the tensions between stability and flexibility, standardization and innovation, conformity and critique.

Scenes of Writing: Strategies for Composing with Genres with Mary Jo Reiff and Anis Bawarshi (2004, reissued 2018) was an early textbook to apply rhetorical genre theory to the teaching of writing. It leads students in analyzing the rhetorical situations of any genre in order to understand any genre they write, to write their own texts more effectively, and to make their own critical decisions about whether and how to conform or innovate within a genre. After teaching the process for any genre, the text guides students through academic, workplace, and public genres they may write.

==== Articles and chapters ====
“Generalizing about Genre: New Conceptions of an Old Concept” (1993) argues for a shift within writing studies from treating genre as a formal convention to seeing it as a constructor of rhetorical situation and context. The implications for teachers and students of writing include that assigning or choosing a genre carries with it expected purposes and audiences as well as rhetorically meaningful textual expectations. Peter Vandenberg has called this article "germinal" and introducing this new concept of genre to the mainstream composition world.

“Intertextuality in Tax Accounting: Generic, Referential, and Functional” (1991) examines the complex interactions of texts and genres within a community as they function to fulfill the community’s needs and reinforce its values. Based on empirical and contextual analysis of texts and interviews, it reports the results of a study on the writing done by tax accountants, examining how the texts within a professional community define and shape the work of that community. Those genres work together as a genre set to define, construct, and perform the work that needs to be done.

“Genre for Social Action: Transforming Worlds through Genre Awareness and Action” (2021) argues that critical genre awareness can and should lead to critical genre action. It suggests and briefly illustrates four ways to use genres not just and but for social action: genre mindfulness, resistance, revision, and creation.
