= Richard Vatz =

American academic, lecturer and writer (born 1946)

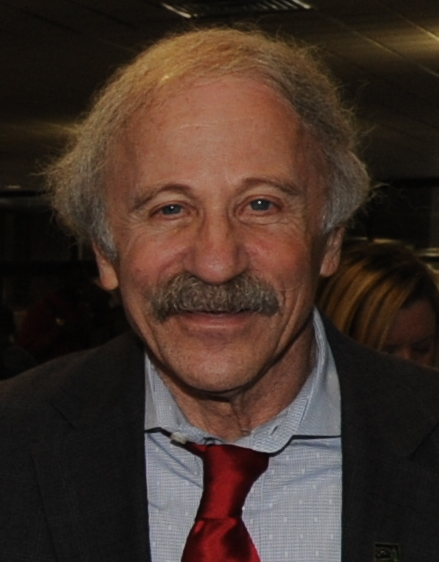
- Born: December 21, 1946 (age 79)
- Occupation: Professor

Richard Eugene Vatz (born December 21, 1946) is an American academic, lecturer and writer who is a professor of Rhetoric and Communication at Towson University.

Vatz was an associate psychology editor for USA Today Magazine from 1987-2022. He has been a member of the National Communication Association since 1969.

Vatz wrote The Only Authentic Book of Persuasion: the Agenda-Spin Model, and he is co-editor of Thomas Szasz: The Man and His Ideas (Transaction Books, 2017). He has also published over 200 articles, reviews and lectures on the preeminence of rhetorical study, political rhetoric, rhetoric and psychiatry and media criticism.

Vatz has spoken at Hillsdale College and the University of Richmond and Middle Tennessee State University, March 4, 1999. He taught a course called "Persuasion" for over one-half century.

He is married to Joanne Pychock Vatz; the couple has two children and two grandchildren.

== Career ==
Vatz has participated in academic lectures, public forums, and political debates throughout his career. In March 1999, he delivered the Windham Fellow Lecture Series in Liberal Arts lecture "Rhetoric and Impeachment" at Middle Tennessee State University. He was a featured speaker at a 2000 symposium honoring psychiatrist and author Thomas Szasz on his 80th birthday, titled "Liberty and/or Psychiatry: 40 Years After 'The Myth of Mental Illness.

From 1993 to 2022, Maryland Governor Bob Ehrlich periodically addressed Vatz's "Persuasion" class at Towson University, continuing until Vatz's retirement. Vatz also moderated several political debates, including a 2002 debate between Maryland State Senate candidates Jim Brochin and Martha Klima and debates involving U.S. House candidates, including Dutch Ruppersberger and Helen Bentley. His public commentary on elections was highlighted in the Towson Times in October 2002, and The Washington Post profiled Ehrlich's appearances in Vatz's Persuasion class in May 2004. He was a member of his Towson University University Senate for a record 41.

== Research ==
Vatz's work has received recognition in the field of rhetoric and communication. A panel on his work, titled "Richard E. Vatz on Rhetoric and Psychiatry," was presented at the National Communication Association (NCA) convention in 1999. He was identified as a major rhetorical theorist in an essay on "The Rhetorical Situation" in Twentieth-Century Roots of Rhetorical Studies and in the 2003 Communication Studies essay "Rhetorical Theory as Message Reception.

In 2002, Vatz was selected by an NCA vice president to participate in a debate on President George W. Bush's policies toward Iraq at the NCA national convention. That year, he also served as an advertising critic for WBAL Radio, providing printed analyses of campaign advertisements during the 2002 elections. In January 2004, the Baltimore Jewish Times published a short biographical feature on Vatz titled "No Rhetoric Here." He was also appointed a lifetime member of the Board of Trustees.

== Works ==
During the 1970s, Vatz published the article, "The Myth of the Rhetorical Situation," in the journal Philosophy and Rhetoric. In it, he critiqued Lloyd Bitzer's 1968 article "The Rhetorical Situation" in the same journal and this has served as the basis for his world view on persuasion; namely, that rhetorical study is conceived most advantageously for the field through a model of competition for agenda and spin, not as controlled by some objective view of reality. Vatz maintains that the latter view makes rhetorical study simply a copy and mouthpiece of other social sciences, fields that are anti-rhetorical. The article became one of the most cited pieces in rhetorical studies, appearing on syllabi across communication programs in the United States and regularly anthologized alongside Bitzer's original piece as the canonical pairing that defines the debate over the rhetorical situation. Scholars typically present the Bitzer-Vatz exchange as establishing the two foundational positions on whether situations constrain rhetorical choice or whether rhetoricians actively construct the meaning of situations. Communication Studies scholars Scott Consigny and Richard Gregg later entered the debate with their own positions, but the Bitzer-Vatz polarity has remained the most frequently taught formulation in undergraduate and graduate rhetoric courses.

In January 2009, Vatz published a follow-up piece to the "Myth" article in the NCA's January, 2009, Review of Communication. The article was titled "The Mythical Status of Situational Rhetoric: Implications for Rhetorical Critics’ Relevance in the Public Arena." Vatz argued there that the "Myth" perspective was the appropriate rhetorical approach to the study of persuasion. In contrast, the perspective offered in "The Rhetorical Situation" was anathema to the academic status of rhetorical study, as it implied that situations caused the production of rhetoric rather than high-ethos rhetoricians' choices. This caused what audiences perceived as dominant situations and their meaning.

In 2012, Vatz published The Only Authentic Book of Persuasion: the Agenda-Spin Model and a new co-edited book Thomas Szasz: The Man and His Ideas and others. He has also published articles on political rhetoric and media criticism in The Wall Street Journal, The Washington Post, The Washington Times and The Los Angeles Times. Vatz has presented hundreds of convention papers and panels at the National Communication Association and Eastern Communication Association (ECA), the SSCA, and elsewhere, including regular analyses of political rhetoric in seminars at the NCA with progressive colleagues.

== Media appearances ==
Vatz has appeared on CNN’s Crossfire, Larry King Live, The Phil Donahue Show, and William F. Buckley's Firing Line. He appeared for over forty years as a guest on WBAL Radio in Baltimore. He has recently appeared on Fox television in Baltimore and Washington.

He has also appeared frequently on WBFF-TV, WMAR-TV, primarily on their talk show "Square Off" hosted by Richard Sher, Maryland Public Television, WJZ-TV, and WBAL-TV.

Over his career Vatz published in The Washington Post, The Baltimore Sun, The Los Angeles Times and multiple other publications; he wrote and writes on conservative perspectives generally.

Vatz was a blogger for Red Maryland and blogged several pieces a year on national conservative perspectives on rhetorical theory, media criticism and contemporary political issues.

Vatz claimed that mental illness should be stigmatized when not caused by physical damage which would be brain disease, claiming that destigmatizing “mental illness” is counterproductive for people with interpersonal or intrapersonal problems to seek help.

== Awards and honors ==
- President's Award for Distinguished Service, 2004, Towson University
- Maryland "Governor’s Citation" for Achievements in Higher Education and Service to Towson University, 2004
- The Thomas Szasz Civil Liberties Award January, 1994
- Winner, Teaching Fellow Award, Eastern Communication Association, 2004
- Keynote Speaker and award-winner at first "Towson's Elite" Night, 2004
- Towson University Faculty Volunteer Service Award, 2003
- "Teacher of the Year," 2002, Towson University, awarded by the Student Government Association
- University Merit Award 1984, 1988, 1990 (awarded to 30 faculty each year 1983-1990)
- Won 1977, 1978, 1979, 1980 – Outstanding Teaching Grants (awarded to ten of approximately 500 full-time faculty each year 1976-1980); most of such awards on faculty to Vatz
- Appointed to Faculty of Honors College, Towson State University, 1982
