= Carolyn Miller =

American academic

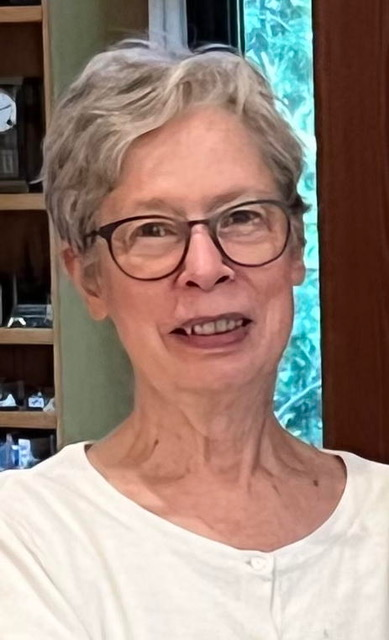
- Miller in 2022
- Born: April 29, 1945 (age 81); Boston, Massachusetts, U.S.
- Known for: Rhetorical genre studies

Academic background
- Education: Rensselaer Polytechnic Institute
- Doctoral advisor: S. Michael Halloran

Academic work
- Discipline: Genre studies, Technical Communication
- Institutions: North Carolina State University

Carolyn Rae Miller (born 1945 in Boston, MA) is SAS Institute Distinguished Professor of Rhetoric and Technical Communication Emerita at North Carolina State University. In 2006 she won the Rigo Award for Lifetime Achievement in Communication Design from the ACM-SIGDOC (Association for Computing Machinery, Special Interest Group in Design of Communication) and in 2016 the Cheryl Geisler Award for Outstanding Mentor, the Rhetoric Society of America. She is a Fellow of the Association of Teachers of Technical Writing (1995) and of the Rhetoric Society of America (2010). Her “groundbreaking and influential article” on “Genre as Social Action” is foundational for Rhetorical Genre Studies. Three of her articles have been identified as essential works in Technical Communication.

== Academic career ==
Carolyn Miller earned her B.A. in English Honors at Penn State University in 1967 followed by her M.A. 1968. In 1980 Carolyn Miller received a Ph.D. in Communication and Rhetoric from Rensselaer Polytechnic Institute with a dissertation on “Environmental Impact Statements and Rhetorical Genres.” After several years as a technical writer and editor, she began her teaching career at North Carolina State University as an Instructor in 1973, was advanced to Assistant Professor in 1980, Associate Professor in 1983, and Full Professor in 1990. There in 1988, she was the founding director of a master’s program in technical communication and in 2005 a doctoral program in communication, rhetoric, and digital media. In 2005 she was named SAS Institute Distinguished Professor of Rhetoric and Technical Communication, retiring in 2015. She was Watson Distinguished Visiting Professor at the University of Louisville in 2013. She has also been visiting professor at Michigan Technological University (1988), Pennsylvania State University (1988), Georgia Institute of Technology (1991), and the Federal University of Pernambuco (2007). She is past president of the Rhetoric Society of America (1996-1997) and past editor of its journal, Rhetoric Society Quarterly.

== Publications ==
Her article “Genre as Social Action” is cited as foundational for rhetorical genre studies and has been identified as an essential work in Technical Communication. It is the most-cited article published in the Quarterly Journal of Speech. It has been translated into Norwegian, Portuguese, and German, has been reprinted in English three times, and has been the subject of special issues of the journals Composition Forum and the Canadian Journal for the Study of Discourse and Writing. In it Miller connects the concept of rhetorical situation characterized by Lloyd Bitzer with the phenomenological and sociological tradition of Alfred Schutz through the concept of typification. She sees genre as embodying typified rhetorical action which also has implication for perceived repetition or typification of situation, form, and motive. Rather than considering genre through a set of formal categories, this conception locates genres in social recognitions that are not finite in number nor determinate in form; rather, they change over time, both decaying and proliferating.

In a 2009 overview of genre research, Karlyn Kohrs Campbell in a handbook chapter on genre included an extensive summary of this article, calling it “groundbreaking.” She wrote, “Miller’s conclusion emphasizes the ways in which social knowledge and language competence teach us how to adopt personae and perform appropriate symbolic acts and to recognize such action in others, which are essential elements in creating and interpreting the discourse that is a part of our daily life as communicators.” In the introduction to his 1998 collection of landmark essays on contemporary rhetoric, which includes “Genre as Social Action,” Thomas Farrell said this essay “builds upon touchstone research in speech communication as well as compositional studies and philosophy of language. This essay works from one of the most wide-ranging bases of literature available to the field. Yet the result is a meticulously developed argument that gives new force to ‘genre’ as a governing term in rhetorical theory.” Aviva Freedman in 1999 said that Miller's article "launched a new field of inquiry, most aptly named rhetorical genre studies (RGS). Her reconceptualization of genre did more than illuminate a heretofore neglected area of composition studies; it cast a new light on all the central issues of writing theory and pedagogy.” She has written a series of other articles that have continued the study of genre, including “Rhetorical community: the cultural basis of genre” and “Blogging as social action: A genre analysis of the Weblog”

Her 1979 article “A Humanistic Rationale for Technical Writing” won the National Council of Teachers of English Award for the Best Article in the Philosophy or Theory of Technical and Scientific Communication, 1975-1980 and is listed as an essential work in Technical Communication. It has been reprinted three times, and is the subject of an article analyzing its influence which identifies it as the most cited article in technical communication and the fourth most cited article in the history of the journal College English. Miller's article argues for a rhetorical approach to scientific and technical discourses that acknowledges their basis in communal goals, values, and conventions. Rather than accepting positivist understandings of science, which assume unproblematic relations between language and the external world, scholars and teachers of technical and scientific writing should seek to understand the basis of persuasive appeals for the relevant audiences of such discourse.

Miller’s other research has explored how concepts from the rhetorical tradition, such as topical invention, kairos or timing, and ethos or character, can interpret contemporary scientific, technical, and digitally-mediated discourse.
