= CARS model =

Academic writing model

The CARS model (Create a Research Space model) is an approach, developed by John M. Swales (1990), to aid in the writing of introductions to academic research. Swales describes three "moves" that are normally required. The moves are: 1: Establishing a Territory; 2: Establishing a Niche; 3: Occupying a Niche

Each of these Moves is then discussed in terms of the steps required to make the move.

Move 1 Establishing a Territory: Requires (Step 1) a claiming of centrality; (Step 2) a making of topic generalizations and (Step 3) a reviewing previous items of research.

Move 2 Establishing a Niche: Here the researcher needs to argue that there is "niche" in the current literature that might be usefully addressed by the research being promoted. Four ways of doing this are identified: Counter-claiming; indicating a gap; question-raising; continuing of a tradition.

Move 3: Occupying a Niche: Here the Niche discussed in Move 2 is discussed in such a way that counter-claim might be substantiated, the gap filled, the question answered and the existing research extended. The steps involved here are (Step 1A) and outlining of the purpose(s) of the work;(Step 1B) announcing present research in the area; (Step 2) announcing the principal findings; (Step 3): indicating the structure of the article.
