= John Swales =

British linguist (1938–2025)

- Born: John Malcolm Swales; 1938; Reigate, England
- Died: 19 March 2025 (aged 86–87)
- Education: University of Cambridge (BS, MA); University of Leeds (PGDip)
- Awards: Honorary PhD, Uppsala University; Honorary PhD, University of Silesia
- Scientific career
- Fields: Linguistics; English as a second language
- Workplaces: University of Bari; University of Libya; University of Leeds; University of Khartoum; University of Aston; University of Michigan

John Malcolm Swales (1938 – 19 March 2025) was an English linguist. He joined the University of Michigan as a faculty member in 1985. He retired in 2006 as professor emeritus of linguistics and co-director of the Michigan Corpus of Academic Spoken English project.

Swales was best known for his work on genre analysis, particularly with regard to its application to the fields of rhetoric, discourse analysis, English for Academic Purposes and, more recently, information science. His writing has studied second language acquisition.

== Life and career ==
Swales was born in 1938 in Reigate, in the south of England, and attended various private schools before going up to Queens' College, Cambridge in 1957.

Educated at the University of Cambridge, Swales received a Bachelor of Science with a major in psychology in 1960 and a Master of Arts in 1964. He received a postgraduate diploma in linguistics and English as a second language from the University of Leeds in 1964.

He first taught in southern Italy for two years, both in a high school and at the local university, and then went to Sweden for a year as an English language teacher. His next move was as an Assistant Lecturer at the University of Libya from 1963 to 1965. After a year studying for an advanced diploma in linguistics and English language teaching at the University of Leeds, UK he returned to Libya as Head of the English Section at the College of Engineering in Tripoli. After three more years at the Leeds Institute of Education, he returned to the Middle East, this time to the prestigious University of Khartoum, Sudan, where he was Director of the English Language Servicing Unit from 1973 to 1978. He returned to the UK in 1978 as a senior lecturer (later reader) in the Language Studies Unit at the University of Aston, where he jointly developed the first master’s course in the teaching of English for Specific Purposes.

In 1985 he moved to the University of Michigan on a visiting position and in 1987 was appointed Professor of Linguistics. He was appointed Director of the English Language Institute from 1985 to 2001. He retired in 2007, but remained Professor Emeritus of Linguistics and an active scholar. His writing on topics such as the concept of discourse community, the relating of descriptive linguistic research to pedagogical uptake, and the design of materials for advanced learners of English, has been influential in many countries around the world. In particular, his analysis of research article introductions (known as the CARS model, short for "Creating A Research Space") has been widely adopted and extended. In more recent years, John Swales has been closely involved with two corpus projects at the English Language Institute at the University of Michigan: MICASE (The Michigan Corpus of Academic Spoken English) and MICUSP (The Michigan Corpus of Upper Level Student Papers). He had honorary doctoral degrees from Uppsala University (2004) and the University of Silesia (2015).

Overall, he has written or co-written twenty books and about 130 research articles or book chapters. He continued to be frequently invited to be a keynote speaker at conferences around the world. A partial list of his book-length publications follows.

Swales died on 18 March 2025.

== Selected publications ==
- That's One Good Thing About Dictators!: My Experience in Libya (Oxford: Pergamon Press, 1969)
- Episodes in ESP (Oxford: Pergamon Press, 1985, ISBN 0-132-83383-2)
- Genre Analysis: English in Academic and Research Settings (Cambridge, 1990, ISBN 0-521-33813-1)
- Other Floors, Other Voices: A Textography of a Small University Building (Erlbaum, 1998, ISBN 0-805-82088-4)
- English in Today’s Research World: A Writing Guide (with C. B. Feak) (University of Michigan Press, 2000, ISBN 0-472-08713-4)
- Academic Writing for Graduate Students, 2nd Ed. (with C. B. Feak) (Michigan, 2004, ISBN 0-472-08856-4)
- Research Genres: Explorations and Applications (Cambridge, 2004, ISBN 0-521-53334-1)
- Telling a Research Story: Writing a Literature Review (with C. B. Feak) (Michigan, 2009, ISBN 0-472-03336-0)
- Abstracts and the Writing of Abstracts (with C. B. Feak) (Michigan, 2009, ISBN 0-472-03335-2)
- Incidents in an Educational Life: A Memoir (of sorts) (Michigan, 2009, ISBN 0-472-03358-1)
- Aspects of Article Introductions (Michigan, 2011, ISBN 0-472-03474-X)
- Navigating Academia: Writing Supporting Genres (with C. B. Feak) (Michigan, 2011, ISBN 0-472-03453-7)
- Creating Contexts: Writing Introductions Across Genres (with C. B. Feak) (Michigan, 2011, ISBN 0-472-03456-1)
- Academic Writing for Graduate Students, 3rd Ed. (with C. B. Feak) (Michigan, 2012, ISBN 0-472-03475-8)
- Reflections on the concept of discourse community (ASp, n. 69, 2016)
- Other Floors, Other Voices: A Textography of a Small University Building, Twentieth Anniversary Ed. (University of Michigan Press, 2018, ISBN 0-472-03717-X)
