= War from the Ground Up =

Book about the nature of civil wars

War from the Ground Up: Twenty-First Century Combat as Politics
- First edition
- Author: Emile Simpson
- Language: English
- Subject: Military science
- Publisher: Oxford University Press
- Publication date: 2012
- Publication place: United States
- Pages: 256
- ISBN: 978-0199327881

War from the Ground Up: Twenty-First Century Combat as Politics is a 2012 book on war and military strategy written by Emile Simpson, a former British Army officer. The book analyzes the War in Afghanistan (2001–2021) in terms of Carl von Clausewitz's theory of war, arguing that modern counter-insurgencies have more in common with domestic political struggles than the traditional state-on-state conflicts described by Clausewitz. The book was favorably reviewed by Michael Howard, a prominent military historian, among others.

== Background ==
Much of War from the Ground Up is an analysis of the 2001–present War in Afghanistan, based on the author's personal experience. Simpson studied history at Jesus College, Oxford under Niall Ferguson before attending the Royal Military Academy Sandhurst and receiving his commission as an officer in the Royal Gurkha Rifles. Simpson deployed to Afghanistan three times, retiring from the Army in 2012.

== Content ==
War from the Ground Up covers a wide range of topics, including grand strategy, civil-military relations, and counter-insurgency. Simpson's primary thesis is that the traditional model of war as a bi-polar conflict between two discrete political units is not helpful on the modern battlefield. Whereas in the past wars were fought to achieve a specifically military end state, soldiers today "directly seek political, as opposed to military, outcomes." At the same time, military leaders must consider the impact of their actions not only on the enemy but on a diverse set of "audiences". Much of the material consists of historical analysis, including a chapter devoted to the Borneo Confrontation of 1962-1966. Elsewhere, Simpson critiques Samuel P. Huntington's 1957 book The Soldier and the State. Whereas Huntington had advocated strict civilian control of the military, Simpson argues for reciprocal dialogue between civilian leaders and the military. Simpson also draws on Aristotle's Rhetoric to emphasize the importance of "strategic narrative," which he defines as "a story" used "to explain one's actions."

== Reception ==
War from the Ground Up received generally positive reviews. Military historian Michael Howard compared the work to The Face of Battle by John Keegan and even On War by Carl von Clausewitz, saying that it "should be compulsory reading at every level in the military." Journalist Thomas Ricks reviewed the book as well, praising its writing style and its exploration of strategic narrative. Paul Raymond Newton, writing for the RUSI Journal, described the book as "impressive" but noted that it incorporated some strawman arguments, while in Parameters Richard Swain found the work to contain a "great wealth of thought" but also some structural deficiencies. Writing on the book in Foreign Affairs, Lawrence Freedman called it "an erudite and intelligent contribution to the literature on counterinsurgency."
