= Rhetorical situation =

Context of a rhetorical event

A rhetorical situation is an event that consists of an issue, an audience, and a set of constraints. A rhetorical situation arises from a given context or exigence. An article by Lloyd Bitzer introduced the model of the rhetorical situation in 1968, which was later challenged and modified by Richard E. Vatz (1973) and Scott Consigny (1974). More recent scholarship has further redefined the model to include more expansive views of rhetorical operations and ecologies.

== Theoretical development ==
In the twentieth century, three influential texts concerning the rhetorical situation were published: Lloyd Bitzer's "The Rhetorical Situation", Richard E. Vatz's "The Myth of the Rhetorical Situation", and Scott Consigny's "Rhetoric and Its Situations". Bitzer argues that a situation determines and brings about rhetoric; Vatz proposes that rhetoric creates "situations" by making issues salient; and Consigny explores the rhetor as an artist of rhetoric, creating salience through a knowledge of commonplaces.

=== Bitzer's definition ===
Lloyd Bitzer began the conversation in his 1968 piece titled "The Rhetorical Situation". Bitzer wrote that rhetorical discourse is called into existence by situation. He defined the rhetorical situation as "a complex of persons, events, objects, and relations presenting an actual or potential exigence which can be completely or partially removed if discourse, introduced into the situation, can so constrain human decision or action as to bring about the significant modification of the exigence." Similar to Aristotle, Bitzer's theory of exigence depended on a notion of rhetoric as dealing with contingent rather than fixed topics or issues. With any rhetorical discourse, a prior rhetorical situation exists. The rhetorical situation dictates the significant physical and verbal responses as well as the sorts of observations to be made. An example of this would be an activist speaking out on climate change as an apparent global problem. The situation, thus, calls for the activist to use and respond with rhetorical discourse on the climate change issue. In other words, rhetorical meaning is brought about by events. Bitzer especially focuses on the sense of timing (kairos) needed to speak about a situation in a way that can best remedy the exigence.

Three constituent parts make up any rhetorical situation.

1. The first constituent part is the exigence, or a problem existing in the world. Exigence is rhetorical when it can be affected and changed by human interaction, and when it is capable of positive modification through the act of persuasion. A rhetorical exigence may be strong, unique, or important, or it may be weak, common, or trivial.
2. The second constituent part is audience. Rhetorical discourse promotes change through influencing an audience's decision and actions.
3. The third constituent part is the set of constraints. Constraints may be the persons, events, objects, and relations that limit decisions and action. Theorists influenced by Marx would additionally discuss ideological constraints, which produce unconscious limitations for subjects in society, including the social constraints of gender, class, and race. The speaker brings about a new set of constraints through the image of his or her personal character (ethos), logical proofs (logos), and use of emotion (pathos).

=== Critical responses ===
==== Vatz's challenge ====
An important critique of Bitzer's theory came in 1973 from Richard E. Vatz. Vatz believes that rhetoric defines a situation, because the context and choices of events could be forever described, but the persuader or influencer or rhetor must select which events to make part of the agenda. Choosing certain events and not others, and deciding their relative value or importance, creates a certain presence, or salience. Vatz quotes Chaïm Perelman: "By the very fact of selecting certain elements and presenting them to the audience, their importance and pertinency to the discussion are implied. Indeed such a choice endows these elements with a presence..."

In essence, Vatz claims that the definitive elements of rhetorical efforts are the struggle to create for a chosen audience saliences or agendas, and this creation is then followed by the struggle to infuse the selected situation or facts with meaning or significance. What are we persuaded to talk about? What are we persuaded it means or signifies? These questions are the relevant ones to understand persuasion, not "What does the situation make us talk about?" or "What does it intrinsically mean?". Situations that do not physically make us attend to them are avoided and reflect the significance of subjectivity in framing socio-political realities. Vatz believes that situations are created, for example, when an activist sets an agenda to focus on climate change, thus creating a "rhetorical situation" (a situation determined by rhetoric). The activist (rhetor) enjoys more agency because they are not "controlled" by a situation, but creates the situation by making it salient in language. Vatz emphasizes the social construction of the situation as opposed to Bitzer's realism or objectivism.

While the two opinions have been widely recognized, Vatz has acknowledged that his piece is less recognized than Bitzer's. Vatz admits, while claiming that audience acceptance is not dispositive for measuring validity or predictive for future audience acceptance, that "more articles and professionals in our field cite his situational perspective than my rhetorical perspective." Bitzer's objectivism is clear, and easily taught as a method, despite Vatz's criticism. Vatz claims that portraying rhetoric as situation-based vitiates rhetoric as an important field, while portraying rhetoric as the cause of what people see as pressing situations enhances its significance as a field of study.

==== Consigny's challenge ====
Another response to Bitzer and Vatz came from Scott Consigny. Consigny believes that Bitzer's theory gives a rhetorical situation proper particularities, but "misconstrues the situation as being thereby determinate and determining," and that Vatz's theory gives the rhetor a correct character but does not correctly account for limits of a rhetor's ability.

Instead, he proposes the idea of rhetoric as an art. Consigny argues that rhetoric gives the means by which a rhetor can engage with a situation by meeting two conditions.

1. The first condition is integrity. Consigny argues that the rhetor must possess multiple opinions with the ability to solve problems through those opinions.
2. The second condition is receptivity. Consigny argues that the rhetor cannot create problems at will, but becomes engaged with particular situations.

Consigny finds that rhetoric which meets the two conditions should be interpreted as an art of topics or commonplaces. Taking after classical rhetoricians, he explains the topic as an instrument and a situation for the rhetor, allowing the rhetor to engage creatively with the situation. As a challenge to both Bitzer and Vatz, Consigny claims that Bitzer has a one-dimensional theory by dismissing the notion of topic as instrument, and that Vatz wrongly allows the rhetor to create problems willfully while ignoring the topic as situation. The intersection of topic as instrument and topic as realm gives the situation both meaning (as a perceptive formal device) and context (as material significance). Consigny concludes:

The real question in rhetorical theory is not whether the situation or the rhetor is "dominant," but the extent, in each case, to which the rhetor can discover and control indeterminate matter, using his art of topics to make sense of what would otherwise remain simply absurd.

=== Other critical responses ===
==== Flower and Hayes ====
In their 1980 article, "The Cognition of Discovery: Defining a Rhetorical Problem", Linda Flower and John R. Hayes expand upon Bitzer's definition of the rhetorical situation. In studying the cognitive processes that induce discovery, Flower and Hayes propose the model of the rhetorical problem. The rhetorical problem consists of two elements: the rhetorical situation (exigence and audience), and the writer's goals involving the reader, persona, meaning, and text. The rhetorical problem model explains how a writer responds to and negotiates a rhetorical situation while addressing and representing his or her goals for a given text.

==== Biesecker ====
In response to both Bitzer and Vatz, Barbara Biesecker challenges the idea of the rhetorical situation in her 1989 article "Rethinking the Rhetorical Situation from Within the Thematic of Différance". Biesecker critiques both Bitzer's claim that rhetoric originates from the situation and Vatz's claim that the rhetoric itself creates its own situation. Rather, she proposes a deconstruction of rhetorical analysis, specifically through the lens of Jacques Derrida's thematic of différance. In addition to questioning proposed views of the speaker and the situation, this lens also challenges the view of the audience as a unified, rational concept. Taken together, Biesecker suggests that the thematic of différance allows us to see the rhetorical situation as an event that does not simply convince audiences to believe or act in a certain way or represent the claims put forth by a static speaker or situation. Rather, she argues, this deconstruction reveals the ability of the rhetorical situation to actually create provisional identities and social relationships through articulation.

==== Garret and Xiao ====
In their 1993 article, Mary Garrett and Xiaosui Xiao apply Bitzer's rhetorical situation model to the response of the Chinese public to the Opium Wars of the 19th century. Garrett and Xiao propose three major changes to the existing theory of the rhetorical situation:

1. Elevating the audience as a defining factor of rhetorical situation, rather than the speaker, because of its role in deciding exigency, kairos ("fittingness"), and constraints.
2. Recognizing the power of discourse traditions within a given culture to influence the audience's perceptions, exigency, kairos, and constraints.
3. Emphasizing the interactive and dialectical nature of the rhetorical situation.

== Rhetorical ecology ==
Rhetorical ecology was cemented as a method by Jenny Edbauer in 2005; this shifted from Lloyd Bitzer's model of rhetorical situations. She argued that this consists of independent elements of exigence, audience, and constraints. Edbauer argues that the rhetorical situation lies within more extensive networks of meaning, or "ecologies."She offered rhetorical ecology as a new method that includes the interaction transformation fluidity openness of all these elements with ongoing social flux. Pushing the theory to be more dynamic than static argues that rhetoric is inherently interactive. Edbauer argues that viewing rhetorical situations as ecologies shows us that "public rhetorics do not only exist in the elements of their situations but also the radius of their neighboring events.

=== Elements of rhetorical ecologies ===
The six core elements of Rhetorical ecology as a method are Interconnectedness, Fluidity and Change, Affective Dimensions, Materiality, Public Engagement, and Historical Context.

Interconnectedness: Rhetorical ecologies emphasize how rhetoric is interconnected in nature. Instead of viewing rhetorical elements like audience, text, and content as separate, individual entities that operate independently, Edbauer argues that utilizing rhetorical ecologies shows a more extensive network of interactions that constantly shape each other.

Fluidity and change: Rhetorical ecologies account for rhetoric's fluidity and change over time. Edbauer points out that situations are not static; they take on a life of their own and evolve due to changing social conditions.

Affective dimensions: The concept of rhetorical ecologies incorporates affective dimensions, such as emotional and sensory experiences, that affect how messages are received and ultimately understood.

Materiality: Rhetorical ecologies also account for the material conditions and aspects of rhetoric, including the physical context in which communication occurs, technology, environment, and cultural artifacts that shape communication practices

Public engagement: Rhetorical ecologies also highlight rhetoric's role in creating public policies and social formations of identity. This aligns closest to materiality, as collective identity is formed through various symbiotic relationships that affect public discourse.

Historical context: Rhetoric did not develop out of nowhere but is impacted by a variety of historical factors. This portion of the framework encourages an examination of the historical and temporal dimensions of rhetoric, ultimately suggesting that understanding the past is vital for analyzing any current rhetorical situation and its possible implications.

=== Theories leading up to rhetorical ecology ===
==== Coe ====
The first time the concepts of rhetoric and ecology were explored in relation to one another was in 1975 by Richard Coe. In his article, "Eco-Logic for the Composition Classroom", Coe offers up eco-logic as an alternative to traditional analytical logic used in rhetoric and composition studies. The contrast between the two is that analytical logic breaks down wholes into smaller parts to examine them, while eco-logic examines the whole as itself. His primary proof in favor of this type of thinking and approach to rhetoric and composition is that the meaning of the written or spoken word is relative to the context in which it is written or spoken.

==== Cooper ====
A more explicit link between rhetoric and ecology was drawn in 1986 by Marilyn Cooper in her article titled "The Ecology of Writing". With an acute focus on the composition classroom, Cooper critiques the notion of writing as a primarily cognitive function, positing that it ignores important social aspects of the writing process. She also argues that a simply contextual perspective of writing is also insufficient; rather, an ecological view of writing extends past the immediate context of a writer and their text to examine the systems that the writer is a part of with other writers. Cooper suggests five different systems that are all intricately interwoven in the actual act of writing: ideas, purposes, interpersonal interactions, cultural norms, and textual forms. Cooper illustrates this ecological model using the metaphor of a web, in that something that impacts one system will inevitably impact all the systems. Cooper also addresses the significant rhetorical concern of audience, claiming that within the ecological model, views of audience are improved as the implication is that there is really communication with a real audience happening, as opposed to an imagined audience, or generalized other. For Cooper, the ecological model allows us to look at people who interact through writing and the systems making up the act of writing itself.

=== Challenges to rhetorical ecology ===
==== Jones ====
In 2021, Madison Jones published an article titled "A Counterhistory of Rhetorical Ecologies", challenging the rhetorical ecology framework. In the article, he explicitly acknowledges that he is not writing off the theory as something inherently bad; rather, he is observing complications within it and offering up creative new perspectives on the topic. He begins by outlining the various environmental, colonial, and nuclear issues that arise when the metaphor of ecology is invoked. Tying this back to rhetoric, he argues that spatiotemporal issues within the idea of rhetorical ecology (i.e., issues that are related to the location and timing of a rhetorical event) are directly linked back to these historical realities interwoven into the larger idea of ecology. He suggests the framework of field histories as a way to acknowledge the complicated history of the field of ecology as it is used rhetorically. He particularly focuses on the need to employ place-based and community-engaged research to better understand the history of the discipline and work toward shaping a better future.

== Other recent theories and applications ==
=== Gallagher ===
John R. Gallagher's 2015 article, "The Rhetorical Template", addresses the rhetorical situation in relation to "Web 2.0" and the templates of social networking sites, such as Facebook. Gallagher defines these Web 2.0 templates as "prefabricated designs that allow writers to create a coherent text." Gallagher contends that rhetorical templates offer a new approach to making meaning within new exigency. Rhetorical templates function within constraints of the genre, but also affect the exigence and purpose by creating how the text is written and read.

=== Ordeman ===
In his 2023 study, William. J Ordeman employs a rhetorical ecology perspective. He examined how power dynamics, historical contexts, and nonhuman agents such as disease or natural disasters influence rhetorical strategies across different communities. He focused his research on Mexican American communities in El Paso, Texas, specifically the Chihuahuita neighborhood. He compared a historical event such as the Spanish flu epidemic (1918) to the communicative strategies used by a mix of government policies and media narratives to illustrate how public health officials communicate to marginalized communities in times of global health pandemic like that of COVID-19. Ordeman argued that the distribution of resources was affected by neoliberal policies and historical context to strip away citizens of their agency.

A fundamental way in which Ordeman's study utilized aspects of rhetorical ecology was its use of nonhuman agents such as the Rio Grande River and infectious diseases. He argued that these factors significantly contributed to the vulnerability of marginalized populations during the Spanish flu outbreak. He argues that Neoliberal policies have and continue to affect the treatment of marginalized bodies by prioritizing the interests and growth of a white economy, leading to the disenfranchisement of communities of color which are then deemed as expendable aliens. Because of these Neo-Liberal policies, Ordeman argues that Mexican Americans face poor working conditions and low wages. This exploration of bodies combined with the lack of governmental support and resources, Ordeman argues, makes this community especially vulnerable to health crises.

=== Gruber ===
In her chapter titled The Power of Ecological Rhetoric Trans-Situational Approaches to Veganism, Vegetarianism, and Plant-Based Food Choice scholar Sibylle Gruber looks at the complexity of food choices. She emphasizes that what we choose to consume is not a simple choice; however, that choice is affcted by various social, political, and cultural factors. Utilizing Blitzer's original rhetorical situation analysis, Gruber stresses the importance of context in understanding how messages surrounding a plant-based diet are constructed and received. Grubber further argues that we must consider the audience, exigence, and constraints that help shape the rhetoric surrounding veganism, Vegetarianism, and environmentalism. She mentions the existence of several rhetorical situations that occur concurrently. These different conversations surrounding veganism are showcased through the sharing of personal narratives from a wide variety of communities. Pinpointing the responses allows Gruber to situate various responses to veganism. It recognizes that knowledge in a rhetorical situation becomes valuable, incorporating new perspectives as they become available. The chapter also furthers the concept of rhetorical ecologies by utilizing a portion of the method. Gruber shows the need for inclusivity from mainstream media in addressing social change and environmental justice.

=== Hitchcock ===
In her 2023 article Framing Palestinian Rights: A Rhetorical Frame Analysis of Vernacular Boycott, Divestment, Sanctions (BDS) Movement Discourse by Jennifer Hitchcock. She applies rhetorical situation methodology to the American political movement supported by many college students nationwide, known as Pro-BDS. Pro-Bds is a political movement supporting Palestinian rights and attempting to scrutinize Israel for its actions regarding Palestinian territories. Hitchcock examines how pro-BDS student activists create and alter discourse surrounding the movement, suggesting that the discourse is ever-evolving as it interacts with various speakers, audiences, and exigencies. A central component from the foundation of the rhetorical situation is the need to focus on the audience, and the students did just that by primarily targeting their discourse to their peers, faculty, and administration. By doing this, the students hoped to resonate with their audience's core values, such as justice, freedom, and equality for all people. This was done in an attempt to increase their persuasive power and solicit emotional empathy. Hitchcock also uniquely utilized expenses by looking at the long-term occupation of Israel on Palestinian land. As well as the short-term or immediate concerts such as Israeli Apartheid Week (IAW). This dual analysis helps contextualize the activist messaging in both the immediate sense and broader historical frames.

=== Fuglsby ===
In her 2023 Dissertation titled: Including Critical Feminist Approaches in the Technical & Professional Communication Classroom: An Autoethnography throughout Changing Rhetorical Ecologies, Brandi Jo Fuglsby advocates for the inclusion of critical feminist perspectives in technical and professional communication (TPC) in higher education. By utilizing a rhetorical ecological perspective, Fuglsby showcases how rhetoric is not about isolated messaging but messaging in and of itself is influenced by various social, cultural, and technological factors. To further emphasize her point, she argues that a classroom is part of a more extensive ecological system where students and teachers alike are affected by outside circumstances in an ongoing process and thus subject to change. Fuglsby furthers that the incorporation of critical feminist approaches into the classroom allows for recognition and support of counter-rhetorical strategies by showcasing how different messages compete with each other. This highlights Fuglsby's belief that rhetoric inside the classroom can either challenge or support the existing narratives. On a technical level, Fuglsby highlights the importance of multimodality in communication practices. She suggests that incorporating different approaches in the classroom also means different mediums, which can affect the learning outcomes of an ever-growing, diverse student population. Her dissertation thus works in meta-formation, one where her argumentation is subject to growth and development similar to that which she studies.

=== Edholm ===
Just as rhetorical situations worked to create the concept of rhetorical ecologies, these methods pushed academia to new heights. In his work Rhetorical Narrative Theory and the Act of Telling: Reflections on the Search for a New Paradigm, Scholar Roger Edholm examines the limits to the current iteration of narrative theory. He borrows from the foundation of the work of rhetorical ecologies to push Narrative theory to new levels. He does this by linking the importance of contextual understanding, which is emphasized in rhetorical ecologies. This point argues that rhetoric should include various social, cultural, and environmental factors. Edholm argues that this shapes how a narrative is created. Where the process becomes dynamic and changing as it shifts from the narrator to the audience and even the narrative itself; another point Edholm makes about the complexity that incorporates communication borrowing from the study of rhetorical ecologies Edholm argues that narrative communication is multilayered and can not be simple formulas however they must include various voices from the environment. Another similarity is that of audience engagement, which rhetorical ecologists submit is an important part of understanding the impact of rhetoric. Edholm argues that how the audience responds to narratives is crucial to understanding the efficacy of rhetoric.

== Rhetorical Circulation in Online Communities ==
Rhetorical situation theory has been expanded recently to account for the rapid circulation of discourse in digital environments through platforms and audiences. Scholars of digital rhetoric deliberate that online communication challenges traditional understanding of audience, exigences, and constraints because messages are no longer limited to a single moment or rhetorical context. Social media platforms permit rhetorical situations to expand actively as users repost, remix, and reinterpret discourse that are created around various communities.

Douglas Eyman argues that digital rhetoric should be understood as a field examining how rhetorical functions within digital spaces, including social media, online activism, and multimodal communication.

== Use in teaching writing ==

The rhetorical situation is a component of some first-year college writing courses, wherein students learn about the rhetorical situation, rhetorical analysis, and awareness of the features they must respond to from their rhetorical situation(s). In this context, the rhetorical situation is taught in several parts:

- Writer: the author, speaker, or other generator of the rhetoric under examination
- Exigence: the reason the author is writing about their particular subject and why they are writing about it at this moment
- Purpose: what the writer wants from the audience
- Audience: the intended (and sometimes unintended) recipients of the writer's message
- Genre: how the topic is presented by the writer to the audience
- Subject: the topic that the writer is discussing
- Context: describes the author, where and when the rhetoric is being created and/or received, etc.
- Constraints: all of the elements that can limit or alter the message's efficacy; this is sometimes grouped together with context

Though some scholars, such as Douglas Downs and Elizabeth Wardle, have criticized the use of the rhetorical situation as a core component of first-year writing courses, arguing that it would be better to teach students about writing and writing studies than it would be to teach them how to write by responding to rhetorical situations. In response, some others (such as Tara Boyce) have noted that both approaches appear to have their limitations, and that challenges remain regardless of approach. Boyce writes that "students, though aware of and capable of implementing [rhetorical] awareness into writing practices, most often do not. The question remains in how to adapt pedagogy to achieve this awareness and how to measure that achievement."
