= Rhetoric (Aristotle) =

Work of literature by Aristotle

Aristotle's Rhetoric (Ancient Greek: Ῥητορική, romanized: Rhētorikḗ; Latin: Ars Rhetorica) is an ancient Greek treatise on the art of persuasion, dating from the 4th century BCE. The English title varies: typically it is Rhetoric, the Art of Rhetoric, On Rhetoric, or a Treatise on Rhetoric.

== Background ==
Aristotle is credited with developing the basics of a system of rhetoric that "thereafter served as [the] touchstone" of the discipline, influencing the development of rhetorical theory from ancient through modern times. The Rhetoric is regarded by most rhetoricians as "the most important single work on persuasion ever written." Alan G. Gross and Arthur Walzer concur, indicating that, just as Alfred North Whitehead considered all Western philosophy a footnote to Plato, "all subsequent rhetorical theory is but a series of responses to issues raised" by Aristotle's Rhetoric. This is largely a reflection of disciplinary divisions, dating back to Peter Ramus' attacks on Aristotelian rhetoric in the late 16th century and continuing to the present.

Like the other works of Aristotle that have survived from antiquity, the Rhetoric seems not to have been intended for publication, being instead a collection of his students' notes in response to his lectures. The treatise shows the development of Aristotle's thought through two different periods while he was in Athens, and illustrates Aristotle's expansion of the study of rhetoric beyond Plato's early criticism of it in the Gorgias (c. 386 BCE) as immoral, dangerous, and unworthy of serious study. Plato's final dialogue on rhetoric, the Phaedrus (c. 370 BCE), offered a more moderate view of rhetoric, acknowledging its value in the hands of a true philosopher (the "midwife of the soul") for "winning the soul through discourse". This dialogue offered Aristotle, first a student and then a teacher at Plato's Academy, a more positive starting point for the development of rhetoric as an art worthy of systematic, scientific study.

Aristotle developed the Rhetoric during two periods when he was in Athens, the first, from 367–347 BCE (when he was second to Plato in the academy); and the second, from 335–322 BCE (when he was running his own school, the Lyceum).

The study of rhetoric was contested in classical Greece: on one side were the sophists, and on the other were Socrates, Plato, and Aristotle. The trio saw rhetoric and poetry as tools that were too often used to manipulate others by appealing to emotion and omitting facts. They accused the sophists in particular—including Gorgias and Isocrates—of this sort of manipulation. Plato blamed sophistical rhetoric for the arrest and the death of Socrates. In contrast to the emotional rhetoric and poetry of the sophists was a type of rhetoric grounded in philosophy and the pursuit of enlightenment.

Aristotle identified rhetoric as one of the three key elements—along with logic and dialectic—of philosophy. The first line of the Rhetoric is: "Rhetoric is a counterpart (antistrophe) of dialectic." According to Aristotle, logic is concerned with reasoning to reach scientific certainty, while dialectic and rhetoric are concerned with probability and, thus, are the branches of philosophy that are best suited to human affairs. Dialectic is a tool for philosophical debate; it is a means for skilled audiences to test probable knowledge in order to learn. Rhetoric is a tool for practical debate; it is a means for persuading a general audience using probable knowledge to resolve practical issues. Dialectic and rhetoric partner to form a system of persuasion based on knowledge instead of upon manipulation and omission.

== Composition process ==
Aristotle wrote versions of the Rhetoric within the range of 360-334 BCE. The latest portions of the work must have been written after 346 BCE when Isocrates' Philippus was published, which is referenced in Rhetoric book 3.

The text of Aristotle's Rhetoric that has been preserved is generally believed to have been edited by Andronicus of Rhodes in the 1st century BCE. Diogenes Laertius lists among Aristotle's writings a 2-volume Art of Rhetoric and a separate treatise, On Style. Demetrius of Phalerum also seems to view On Style as an independent work. However, Quintilian describes Aristotle's On Rhetoric as having three volumes. Book 3 of the preserved text of the Rhetoric is widely regarded to have originally been published as a separate work based on its style and arrangement.

Some scholars suggest that Aristotle's students and successors may have contributed to the text as we have received it in addition to Aristotle himself. Tomas Veteikis says "Aristotle's own contribution to Corpus Aristotelicum and the actual shape of his Rhetoric in his lifetime is a matter of discussion". Veteikis prefers to refer to "the author or composer of Rhetoric" rather than naming him as Aristotle.

== English translation ==
Most English readers in the 20th century relied on four translations of the Rhetoric. The first, by Richard C. Jebb, was published in 1909. The next two translations were published in the 1920s. John H. Freese's translation was published as a part of the Loeb Classical Library while W. Rhys Roberts' was published as a part of the Oxford University series of works in the Classics. Roberts' translation was edited and republished in 1954, and is widely available online. The fourth standard translation, by Lane Cooper, came out in 1932.

Not until the 1990s did another major translation of the Rhetoric appear. Published in 1991 and translated by George A. Kennedy, a leading classicist and rhetorician, this work is notable for the precision of its translation and for its extensive commentary, notes, and references to modern scholarship on Aristotle and the Rhetoric. It is generally regarded today as the standard scholarly resource on the Rhetoric.

Modern translations are still being produced, such as the ones published in 2008 by Joe Sachs and the 2019 one by Robert C. Bartlett.

== Neo-Aristotelian theory ==
Rhetorical theory and criticism in the first half of the 20th century was dominated by neo-Aristotelian criticism, the tenets of which were grounded in the Rhetoric and were summed up in 1925 by Herbert Wichelns. (Forbes I. Hill argues that while Wichelns traditionally gets the credit for summing up neo-Aristotelian theory, Hoyt Hopewell Hudson is more deserving of this credit instead.) The dominance of neo-Aristotelian criticism was "virtually unchallenged until the 1960s" and even now is considered not only as one of many approaches to criticism, but as fundamental for understanding other theoretical and critical approaches which "developed largely in response to [its] strengths and weaknesses."

== Overview of Book I ==
The Rhetoric consists of three books. Book I offers a general overview, presenting the purposes of rhetoric and a working definition; it also offers a detailed discussion of the major contexts and types of rhetoric. Book II discusses in detail the three means of persuasion that an orator must rely on: those grounded in credibility (ethos), in the emotions and psychology of the audience (pathos), and in patterns of reasoning (logos). Book III introduces the elements of style (word choice, metaphor, and sentence structure) and arrangement (organization). Some attention is paid to delivery, but generally the reader is referred to the Poetics for more information in that area.

Many chapters in Book I cover typical deliberative argument varieties in Athenian culture.

Chapter One
Aristotle says rhetoric is the counterpart (antistrophe) of dialectic. He explains the similarities between the two but fails to comment on the differences. Here he introduces the term enthymeme.

Chapter Two
Aristotle defines rhetoric as the ability in a particular case to see the available means of persuasion. He defines pisteis (plural of πῐ́στῐς, pístis, lit. ''trust in others, faith; means of persuasion'') as atechnic (inartistic) and entechnic (artistic). Of the pisteis provided through speech there are three: ethos, pathos, and logos. He introduces paradigms and syllogisms as means of persuasion.

Chapter Three
Aristotle introduces the three genres of rhetoric: deliberative, forensic, and epideictic rhetoric. He also touches on which "ends" the orators in each of these genres hope to reach with their persuasions—which are discussed in further detail in later chapters. Aristotle introduces these three genres by saying that "[t]he kinds of rhetoric are three in number, corresponding to the three kinds of hearers".

Chapter Four
Aristotle discusses the types of political topics of deliberative rhetoric. The five most common are finance, war and peace, national defense, imports and exports, and the framing of laws.

Chapter Five
Aristotle discusses the different ethical topics of deliberative rhetoric. Aristotle identifies the telos (goal) of human action with eudaimonia ("happiness" or "flourishing") and describes the many factors contributing to it.

Chapter Six
This explains in greater detail the stoikhea (elements) of the "good" described in the previous chapter.

Chapter Seven
Introduces the term koinon of degree. Discusses the "ends" of deliberative rhetoric in relation to the greater good or more advantageous.

Chapter Eight
Aristotle defines and discusses the four forms of politeia useful in deliberative rhetoric: democracy, oligarchy, aristocracy, and monarchy.

Chapter Nine
This chapter discusses the virtues and concepts of to kalon (the honorable) included in epideictic rhetoric. Aristotle describes what makes certain topics appropriate or worthy for praise or blame. He also states that it is important to highlight certain traits of the subject of praise.

Chapter Ten
Aristotle discusses what syllogisms should be derived from kategoria (accusations) and apologia (defenses) for judicial rhetoric. He also introduces the wrongdoing, which is useful for judicial rhetoric.

Chapter Eleven
This chapter discusses the many different types of hedone (pleasure) useful in judicial rhetoric to describe the motives for people doing wrong.

Chapter Twelve
This chapter, also about judicial rhetoric, discusses people's dispositions of mind and whom people wrong from motives of hedone discussed in the previous chapter. Aristotle emphasizes the importance of willingness, or intentions, of wrongdoings.

Chapter Thirteen
Aristotle classifies all acts that are just and unjust defined in judicial rhetoric. He also distinguishes what kinds of actions are fair and unfair with being just.

Chapter Fourteen
This chapter parallels the koinon described in chapter Seven. Aristotle clarifies the magnitude in relation to questions of "wrongdoing" meant for judicial rhetoric.

Chapter Fifteen
Aristotle summarizes the arguments available to a speaker in dealing with evidence that supports or weakens a case. These atechnic pisteis contain laws, witnesses, contracts, tortures, and oaths.

== Overview of Book II ==
Book II gives advice for all types of speeches. Aristotle's Rhetoric generally concentrates on ethos and pathos, and—as noted by Aristotle—both affect judgment. Aristotle refers to the effect of ethos and pathos on an audience since a speaker needs to exhibit these modes of persuasion.

=== Chapter 1 ===
In Chapter 1, Aristotle notes that emotions cause men to change their opinions and judgments. As such, emotions have specific causes and effects. A speaker can therefore employ this understanding to stimulate particular emotions from an audience. However, Aristotle states that along with pathos, the speaker must also exhibit ethos, which for Aristotle encompasses phronesis, arete, and eunoia.

=== Chapters 2–11 ===
Chapters 2–11 explore those emotions useful to a rhetorical speaker. Aristotle describes how to arouse these emotions in an audience so that a speaker might be able to produce the desired action successfully. Aristotle arranges the discussion of the emotions in opposing pairs, such as anger and calmness or friendliness and enmity. For each emotion, Aristotle discusses the person's state of mind, against whom one directs the emotion, and for what reasons. It is pertinent to understand all the components in order to stimulate a certain emotion within another person.

For example, to Aristotle, anger results from the feeling of belittlement. Those who become angry are distressed due to a foiling of their desires. The angry direct their emotion towards those who insult them or that which those people value. These insults are the reasoning behind the anger.

In this way, Aristotle defines each emotion, assesses the state of mind for those experiencing the emotion, determines to whom people direct the emotion, and reveals their reasoning behind the emotion. The significance of Aristotle's analysis stems from his idea that emotions have logical grounding and material sources.

=== Chapters 12–17 ===
George A. Kennedy in a note to On Rhetoric: A Theory of Civic Discourse remarks that ethos predominantly refers to the "moral character" of actions and mind. Kennedy reveals the purpose of chapters 12–17 as a demonstration to the speaker of "how his ethos must attend and adjust to the ethos of varied types of auditor if he is to address them successfully." As seen in the chapters explaining the various emotions, in chapters 12–17 Aristotle focuses on the necessary means of successfully persuading an audience. Yet, in these chapters, Aristotle analyzes the character of different groups of people so that a speaker might adjust his portrayed ethos in order to influence the audience.

First, he describes the young as creatures of desire, easily changeable and swiftly satisfied. The young hate to be belittled because they long for superiority. According to Aristotle, the old are distrustful, cynical, and small-minded, for unlike the young their past is long and their future short. The old do not act on desire but rather act for profit. Those in the prime of life represent the mean to Aristotle, possessing the advantages of both old and young without excess or deficiency. One of good birth, wealth, or power has the character of a lucky fool, a character in which insolence and arrogance breed if these good fortunes are not used to one's advantage.

=== Chapters 18–26 ===
Although Book II primarily focuses on ethos and pathos, Aristotle discusses paradigm and enthymeme as two common modes of persuasion. There are two kinds of paradigm: comparisons, referencing that which has happened before; and fables, inventing an illustration. Maxims, or succinct, clever statements about actions, serve as the conclusion of enthymemes. In choosing a maxim, one should assess the audience views and employ a fitting maxim. Amplification and deprecation, although not elements of an enthymeme, can contribute to refuting an opponent's enthymeme or revealing a falsehood by exposing it as just or unjust, good or evil, etc. Aristotle also mentions the koina, fallacious enthymemes, and lysis (the refutation of an opponent's enthymeme). In all of these techniques, Aristotle considers popular wisdom and audiences as a central guide. Thus, the speaker's effect on the audience serves as a key theme throughout Book II.

Book II ends with a transition to Book III. The transition concludes the discussion of pathos, ethos, paradigms, enthymemes, and maxims so that Book III may focus on delivery, style, and arrangement.

== Overview of Book III ==
Book III of Aristotle's Rhetoric is often overshadowed by the first two books. While Books I and II are more systematic and address ethos, logos, and pathos, Book III is often considered a conglomeration of Greek stylistic devices on rhetoric. However, Book III contains informative material on lexis (style) which refers to the "way of saying" and taxis, which refers to the arrangement of words.

=== Chapters 1–12: style (lexis) ===
Chapter 1
Summarizes Book I and Book II and introduces the term hypokrisis (pronuntiatio). Aristotle argues that voice should be used to most accurately represent the given situation as exemplified by poets.

Chapter 2
Highlights aretê, which is defined as virtue or excellence. When applied to rhetoric, aretê means natural rather than forced or artificial. Metaphors are also addressed as a skill that cannot be taught and that should bestow "verbal beauty".

Chapter 3
Deals with "frigid" language. This occurs when one uses elaborate double words, archaic and rare words, added descriptive words or phrases, and inappropriate metaphors.

Chapter 4
Discusses another figurative part of speech, the simile (also known as an eikon). Similes are only occasionally useful in speech due to their poetic nature and similarity to metaphor.

Chapter 5
Addresses how to speak properly by using connectives, calling things by their specific name, avoiding terms with ambiguous meanings, observing the gender of nouns, and correctly using singular and plural words.

Chapter 6
Gives practical advice on how to amplify language by using onkos (expansiveness) and syntomia (conciseness). Not using the term circle, but giving its definition, would exemplify onkos, and using the word as the definition would exemplify syntomia.

Chapter 7
Aristotle expands on the use of appropriate style in addressing the subject. "Lexis will be appropriate if it expresses emotion and character and is proportional to the subject matter". Aristotle stresses emotion, credibility, genus (like age), and moral state as important considerations.

Chapter 8
Rhythm should be incorporated into prose to make it well "rhythmed" but not to the extent of a poem.

Chapter 9
Looks at periodic style and how it should be seen as a rhythmical unit and used to complete a thought to help understand meaning.

Chapter 10
Aristotle further highlights the metaphor and addresses how it brings about learning and enables visualization

Chapter 11
Explains why devices of style can defamiliarize language. Aristotle warns that it is inappropriate to speak in hyperbole.

Chapter 12
The three genres of oral and written language are deliberative, judicial, and epideictic, all of which are written by logographoi (speech writers) who are each skilled at different types of speeches. This transitions into the next set of chapters on taxis.

=== Chapters 13–19: parts of speech ===
Chapter 13
Covers the necessary parts of a speech which include the prosthesis (which is the statement of the proposition) and then the pistis (which is the proof of the statement), along with the prooemium (introduction) and epilogue.

Chapter 14
Discusses the prooemiun, which demonstrates how the introduction should be used in both epideictic and judicial speeches. Both have the main goal of signaling the end of the speech.

Chapter 15
Handles prejudicial attacks according to Aristotle which later on became part of stasis which is "determining the question at issue in a trial".

Chapter 16
Diēgēsis or narration is discussed and how one must work through an argument by using logos. Narration differs between epideictic, judicial, and deliberative narratives.

Chapter 17
Looks at the pistis or the proof in an oration, and how it varies in each type of speech.

Chapter 18
Erotēsis, also known as interrogation, referred to asking and demanding responses in trials during Aristotle's time. It is "most opportune when an opponent has said one thing and when if the right question is asked, an absurdity results".

Chapter 19
Epilogues are the conclusion of speeches and must include four things: "disposing the hearer favorably toward the speaker and unfavorably to the opponent, amplifying and minimizing, moving the hearer into emotional reactions, and giving reminder of the speech's main points".

Scholars turn to Book III to develop theories about Greek style and its contemporary relevance.

== Reception ==
Martin Heidegger praises the work in Being and Time as "the first systematic hermeneutic of the everydayness of Being with one another".

=== Importance of deliberative rhetoric ===
Amélie Oksenberg Rorty discusses the structure and characteristics of deliberative rhetoric in her research. She cites Aristotle to persuade her audience of the characteristics of deliberative rhetoric's influential nature. "Aristotle marks as central to deliberative rhetoric: considerations of prudence and justice, the projected political and psychological consequences of the decision and the likelihood of encouraging—or entrenching—similar rebellious attitudes amongst allies." The outstanding characteristic of deliberative rhetoric is practicality, Rorty argues: "the deliberative rhetorician who wishes to retain his reputation as trustworthy must pay attention to what is, in fact, actually likely to happen." Additionally, Aristotle focuses on deliberative rhetoric so heavily because "it most clearly reveals the primary importance of truth as it functions within the craft of rhetoric itself." A path to action is determined through deliberative rhetoric, since an individual following practical means is likely to foresee likely events and act accordingly.

In interpreting Aristotle's work on use of rhetoric, Bernard Yack discusses the vast need for public discourse and public reasoning. He states: "We deliberate together in political communities by making and listening to each other's attempts to persuade us that some future action will best serve the end that citizens share with each other... It is this shared goal that distinguishes deliberative rhetoric, and therefore public reasoning, from the other forms of rhetoric and political judgment that Aristotle examines." Shared goals are of utmost importance when deliberating on an issue that affects the common good. Without such a version of deliberative rhetoric, arguments would unfairly favor the interests of power and neglect the rights of the common people.

== See also ==
- Enthymeme
- The Art of Being Right
- Contra principia negantem disputari non potest
- War from the Ground Up, book partially based on Aristotle's Rhetoric
