= Epideictic =

Branch or "eidē" of rhetoric

The epideictic oratory, also called ceremonial oratory or praise-and-blame rhetoric, is one of the three branches, or "species" (eidē), of rhetoric, as outlined in Aristotle's Rhetoric, to be used to praise or blame, during ceremonies.

== Origin and pronunciation ==
The term's root has to do with display or show (δεῖξις deixis). It is a literary or rhetorical term from the Greek ἐπιδεικτικός "for rhetorical effect". It is generally pronounced /ɛpɪˈdaɪktɪk/.

== Characteristics ==
This is rhetoric of ceremony, commemoration, declamation, demonstration, on the one hand, and of play, entertainment and display, including self-display. It is also the rhetoric used at festivals, the Olympic games, state visits and other formal events like the opening and closing ceremonies, and celebrations of anniversaries of important events, including illustrious victories, births, deaths, and weddings. Its major subject is praise and blame, according to Aristotle in the limited space he provides for it in the Art of Rhetoric (Freese translation).

This rhetoric deals with goodness, excellence, nobility, shame, honor, dishonor, beauty, and matters of virtue and vice. The virtues or the "components" of virtue according to Aristotle, were "justice, courage, self-control, magnificence, magnanimity, liberality, gentleness, practical and speculative wisdom" or "reason". Vice was the "contrary" of virtue.

In his book Rhetoric and Poetics in Antiquity, Jeffrey Walker claims that epideictic rhetoric predates the rhetoric of courts and politics, the study of which began in the 5th or 4th century BC with the Sophists. The other two kinds of public speech were deliberative or political speech, and forensic, judicial, or legal speech. Epideictic rhetoric or style is according to Aristotle most appropriate for material that is written or read. In the Art of Rhetoric, Aristotle stated that "The epideictic style is especially suited to written compositions; for its function is reading." (Book III, 12).

== Aristotle on epideixis ==
Aristotle instructs that in creating a speech of praise or blame, the author should consider the attitude of their audience: Will they be moved to see his object of praise (be it a person or a thing) in a new light, or will he be wasting everyone's time by "preaching to the choir"? What values and behavior does this particular audience find praiseworthy? Whether the audience is sympathetic, hostile, or indifferent to their object of praise or blame determines how difficult the task is that lies before them. As Aristotle reminds the reader, "[F]or as Socrates used to say, it is not difficult to praise Athenians in Athens" (Rhetoric, 1367b).

According to Aristotle's conception of epideixis, “the present is the most important; for all speakers praise or blame in regard to existing qualities, but they often make use of other things, both reminding [the audience] of the past and projecting the course of the future” (Rhet. 1358b). Epideixis is Aristotle's least favored and clearly defined topic. Now considered to be the stuff of ceremonies with its exhortations, panegyrics, encomia, funeral orations and displays of oratorical prowess, epideictic rhetoric appears to most to be discourse less about depth and more attuned to style without substance. Still, the Art of Rhetoric is cited as an example of epideictic work.

Epideixis may not deserve the charge of lacking depth. The charge that this branch of rhetoric lacks depth can be countered by the recognition that it systematizes the successful attribution of value (to things, people, or concepts). Attributing value (whether in terms of "the good" and "the bad" or of "virtue" and "vice") to 1) perception, 2) emotions, 3) thought, 4) action, and 5) goals is the fundamental basis of relativistic conceptions of 1) aesthetics, 2) human character, 3) intelligence, 4) ethics, and 5) wisdom. For instance, applying epideixis to 'human perceptions' yields aesthetics, and its application to 'human action' yields fundamental relativistic ethics. Nevertheless, epideixis can always be reduced to simply the study of how best to preach the positive or negative characteristics of creatures, contraptions, concepts (etc.) to an audience. Epideictic rhetoric appeals to - and serves to sway - personal and cultural values, whereas pure deliberative and judicial rhetoric appeal to reason alone.

And, Lockwood, also in The Reader's Figure, describes how readers are figured by their readings, and how readers figure their readings, and that readers can accept the readers' account, and forget their own account of their present and past, and that the rhetor's account is produced by language.

== Modern authors on epideixis ==
For centuries, epideictic oratory was a contested term, for it is clearly present in both forensic and deliberative forms, but it is difficult to clarify when it appears as a dominant discursive form. According to Chaïm Perelman and Lucy Olbrechts-Tyteca, “The speaker engaged in epidictic discourse is very close to being an educator. Since what he is going to say does not arouse controversy, since no immediate practical interest is ever involved, and there is no question of attacking or defending, but simply of promoting values that are shared in the community . . .” (52). Some of the defining terms for epideictic discourse include declamation, demonstration, praise or blame of the personal, and pleasing or inspiring to an audience.

Lawrence W. Rosenfield contends that epideictic practice surpasses mere praise and blame, and it is more than a showy display of rhetorical skill: “Epideictic’s understanding calls upon us to join with our community in giving thought to what we witness, and such thoughtful beholding in commemoration constitutes memorializing”. Epideictic rhetoric also calls for witnessing events, acknowledging temporality and contingency (140). However, as Rosenfield suspects, it is an uncommon form of discourse because of the rarity of “its necessary constituents — openness of mind, felt reverence for reality, enthusiasm for life, the ability to congeal significant experiences in memorable language . . .” (150).

The philologist Ernst Curtius provides an account of its history, and many examples, in European Literature and the Latin Middle Ages. Praise and blame were "reduced" to praise by Aristotle, he wrote; and recently another author called it a "blameless genre". He and Lockwood seem to say that what was in the past called rhetoric was later called literature. Curtius believed that misinterpretations of medieval literature occur because so much of it is epideictic, and the epideictic is so alien to us today. During the Middle Ages it became a "school subject" as the sites for political activity diminished in the West, and as the centuries went on the word "praise" came to mean that which was written. During this period literature (more specifically histories, biographies, autobiographies, geographies) was called praise.

Ben Witherington III, writing from a biblical perspective on sacred exhortation, noted that "in general, epideictic rhetoric is highly emotional and meant to inspire the audience to appreciate something or someone, or at the other end of the spectrum, despise something or someone. Epideictic rhetoric seeks to charm, or to cast odium."

== In poetry ==
Commendatory verse is a genre of epideictic writing. In the Renaissance and Early Modern European tradition, it glorified both its author and the person to whom it was addressed. Prefatory verses of this kind— e.g. those printed as preface to a book—became a recognised type of advertising in the book trade.

A significant example of epideictic writing in Chinese poetry is the fu rhapsody that developed in the early Han dynasty. This highly ornamented style was used for almost any subject imaginable, and often incorporated obscure language with extensive cataloguing of rare items, all in verse of varying rhyme and line length.

== See also ==
- Deictic – Words requiring context to understand their meaning
- Deliberative rhetoric
- Forensic rhetoric
- Gratitude
- Praise
- Signifying
- Panegyric
- Encomium
