= Forensic rhetoric =

Forensic rhetoric, as described by Aristotle's On Rhetoric, encompasses any discussion of past action including public legal discourse—the primary setting for the emergence of rhetoric as a discipline and theory. It promotes hindsight as a way to search for justice.This contrasts with deliberative rhetoric and epideictic rhetoric, which are reserved for discussions concerning future and present actions respectively.

In contemporary times, the word forensic is commonly associated with criminal and civil law referring specifically to forensic science. The term forensic associated with criminal investigation exists because forensic (or judicial) rhetoric first existed. Essentially, forensic rhetoric is reserved for "passing judgement."

== References in On Rhetoric ==
An introduction of the three types of rhetoric (forensic, deliberative, and epideictic) occurs in Book I Chapter III of Aristotle's On Rhetoric. Discussion of forensic rhetoric is found in Book I, Chapters X–XV, outlined as follows:

- Chapter 10: "Topics about Wrongdoing" asserts: "Let wrongdoing be defined as doing harm willingly in contravention of the law." Aristotle also defines three considerations of forensic rhetoric: 1. For what purposes persons do wrong 2. How these persons are mentally disposed 3. What kind of persons they wrong and what these persons are like.
- Chapter 11: "Topics about Pleasure" categorizes pleasure as natural, not compulsive, and can be the cause of crime: gaining revenge, winning, or restoring honor.
- Chapter 12: "Topics about Wrongdoers and Those Wronged" includes many features of both the wrongdoers and the wronged that relate to criminalities:
  - Wrongdoers: believe they will not be detected or punished, are likely to go unsuspected if their appearance is inconsistent with the charges (a weak man charged with assault), have either no enemy or many enemies.
  - Those who are wronged: have something the wrongdoer lacks, do not live cautiously, have never been wronged, or have been often wronged with no retaliation.
- Chapter 13: "Topics about Justice and Injustice" discusses the law in two ways: specific (that which has been defined for each person) and common (that which is based on nature or common principle).
- Chapter 14: "The Koinon of Degree of Magnitude" proposes: "A wrong is greater insofar as it is caused by greater injustice. Thus the least wrong can sometimes be the greatest." Aristotle asserts that varying degrees of wrong exist based on the accessibility of retribution from the wronged and punishment for the wrongdoer.
- Chapter 15: "Atechnic Pisteis in Judicial Rhetoric: Laws, Witnesses, Contracts, Tortures, Oaths" summarizes the objects listed in its title, including evidence that supports or refutes a case. These summaries and guidelines are very practical in law both in Aristotle's and in modern times. Aristotle also focuses on fairness and introduces the possibility that the defendant could be legally guilty yet morally justified.

== Beginning connections between law and rhetoric ==
According to George A. Kennedy, rhetoric emerged as a response to legal freedoms introduced in Greece around 467 BCE. "Citizens found themselves involved in litigation... and were forced to take up their own cases before the courts. They required a rhetorical technique that required and used a proof for an argument. A few clever Sicilians developed simple techniques for effective presentation and argumentation in the law courts and taught them to others." Thus, trained capacity in speech-making and the theory about such speech-making exists because of legal exigencies. The end goal was persuasion and litigants used rhetorical interaction to support this goal. Summarily, these early rhetoricians had to use specific techniques to ensure justice. Additionally, these publicized instances of forensic oratory generally utilized performance techniques similar to that of ancient legal dramas.

The Stasis Doctrine, proposed by Hermagoras, is an approach to systematically analyze legal cases, which many scholars include in their treatises of rhetoric, most famously in Cicero's "De Inventione." Encyclopedia author James Jasinski describes this doctrine as taxonomy to classify relevant questions in a debate and the existence or nonexistence of a fact in law. Essentially, its goal is to reference "staseis," the raw facts of a situation according to Aristotle. The Stasis Doctrine is incorporated in rhetoric handbooks today.

== Traditional connection between law and rhetoric ==
Since forensic rhetoric's original purpose was to win courtroom cases, legal aids have been trained in it since legal freedoms emerged. Because in early law courts, citizens were expected to represent themselves and training in forensic rhetoric was very beneficial. In ancient Athens, litigants in a private lawsuit and defendants in a criminal prosecution were expected to handle their own case before the court—a practice that Aristotle approved of. The hearings would consist of questions addressed to the litigant/defendant and were asked by a member of the Court, or the litigants could ask one another; these circumstances did not call for legal or oratorical talent—therefore oratory or legalism was not expected, encouraged, or appreciated.

After the time of Solon, the Court of Areopagus was replaced and the litigant/defendant would deliver a prepared speech before the courts to try and sway the jury; they expected dramatic and brilliant oratorical displays. Now, listeners appreciated oratorical and even legalistic niceties, such as appeals to passion, piety, and prejudice. It was at this point in Athens history where the forensic speech-writer made his first appearance. The speech-writer would prepare an address which the litigant/defendant memorized and delivered before the court. Forensic speech-writing and oratory soon became an essential part of the public performance of general rhetoric. After the nineteenth century, forensic rhetoric "became the exclusive province of lawyers,” as it essentially remains today. These people were experts in the court system and dominated forensic rhetoric, since it is tied to past events—thus the relationship between law and rhetoric was solidified. Many of the "norms" established in Athenian rhetoric became standard through the continued practice of stylistic forensic rhetoric. Scholar Virginia Wohl summarily explains this concept and describes early forensic oratory as "a genre made up of typicalities..."

== Contemporary connection between law and rhetoric ==
The critical legal studies movement occurred because as John L. Lucaites, a prominent author on the subject, concluded both legal studies and rhetorical scholars desire to demystify complex law discourse. His task was to "explore how 'the law'—conceptualized as a series of institutional procedures and relationships—functions within a larger 'rhetorical culture'."

Author James Boyd White cultivated the law and literature movement, promoting the relationship between law and rhetorical literary studies at the constitutive level of discourse. The name law and literature relates to both the study of law in literature (such as legal fiction) and law as literature (the community built from a discourse community). This movement asserts that the process of interpretation, both in law and literature, is rhetorical: "interpretation is a process of constructing arguments and the meaning of a text emerges through rhetorical interaction."

== See also ==
- Deliberative rhetoric
- Epideictic
