= Deliberative rhetoric =

Kind of rhetoric described by Aristotle

Deliberative rhetoric (Greek: γένος συμβουλευτικόν, genos symbouleutikon; Latin: genus deliberativum; sometimes called legislative oratory) is one of the three kinds of rhetoric described by Aristotle. Deliberative rhetoric juxtaposes potential future outcomes to communicate support or opposition for a given action or policy. In deliberative rhetoric, an argument is made using examples from the past to predict future outcomes in order to illustrate that a given policy or action will either be harmful or beneficial in the future. It differs from deliberative democracy, which is a form of governmental discourse or institution that prioritizes public debate.

Aristotle proposed that the form and function of speeches are shaped by the possible speech goals, and classified three different types of speeches to exemplify a range of purposes: forensic, epideictic, and deliberative. Deliberative speeches are those that argue for a course of action, derived from the Greek sumbouleutikos, meaning “to weigh” or “to consider.” Designed for use in the senate, the purpose of deliberative speeches is to make a case for what people should or should not do in the future.

In Rhetoric (4th century BCE), Aristotle wrote that deliberative rhetoric is relevant in political debate since the "political orator is concerned with the future: it is about things to be done hereafter that he advises, for or against." According to Aristotle, political orators make an argument for a particular position on the grounds that the future results will be in the public's best interest. He wrote that a politician "aims at establishing the expediency or the harmfulness of a proposed course of action; if he urges its acceptance, he does so on the ground that it will do good; if he urges its rejection, he does so on the ground that it will do harm."

== See also ==
- Epideictic
- Forensic rhetoric
