= Word of God =

Word of God or God's Word may refer to:

== Religion and philosophy ==
- Certain religious texts, especially:
  - The Bible
  - The Quran
- Logos, a Western philosophical, psychological, religious, and rhetorical term
  - Logos (Christianity), a name or title of Jesus Christ, seen as the pre-existent second person of the Trinity
- Rhema, a word that signifies the action of utterance
  - Rhema (doctrine), a divine revelation or inspiration given to an individual
- Dabar (Hebrew word), meaning "word", "talk", or "thing" in Hebrew
- Divine language, the concept of a mystical or divine proto-language, which predates and supersedes human speech

== Other uses ==
- Word of God (community), a Christian community in Ann Arbor, Michigan
- Word of God (film), a 2017 Danish film
- God's Word Translation (GW), an English translation of the Bible
- The Word of God, a superpower of Jesse Custer in the comic book series Preacher

== See also ==
- Divine Word (disambiguation)
