= Divine Word =

Divine Word or Divine Logos may refer to:

== Religious philosophy ==
- Divine language, the concept of a mystical or divine proto-language, which predates and supersedes human speech
- Religious text, a text that a religion considers to be of central importance to its religious tradition
  - List of religious texts
- Dabar (Hebrew word), meaning "word", "talk", or "thing" in Hebrew
- Logos (Christianity), a name or title of Jesus Christ, seen as the pre-existent second person of the Trinity
- Rhema (doctrine), a divine revelation or inspiration given to an individual

== Organizations ==
- Society of the Divine Word, a Catholic missionary order
  - Divine Word College, a Catholic seminary
  - Divine Word University, a Catholic university

== See also ==
- Word of God (disambiguation)
