= Beyond the Time =

1988 single by TM Network

"Beyond the Time ~Möbius no Sora wo Koete~"

Single by TM Network

from the album Mobile Suit Gundam: Char's Counterattack (Original Soundtrack)
- Language: Japanese
- English title: Beyond the Time ~Beyond the Möbius Universe~
- B-side: "Beyond the Time (Instrumental Mix)"
- Released: March 5, 1988
- Genre: J-pop; synth-pop
- Length: 5:34
- Label: Epic Records
- Composer: Tetsuya Komuro
- Lyricist: Mitsuko Komuro
- Producer: Tetsuya Komuro

TM Network singles chronology
"Resistance" (1988)	"Beyond the Time ~Möbius no Sora wo Koete~" (1988)	"Seven Days War" (1988)

Alternative cover
- 2025 version cover

Music videos
- "Beyond the Time ~Möbius no Sora wo Koete~" on YouTube

"Beyond the Time ~Möbius no Sora wo Koete~" (BEYOND THE TIME (メビウスの宇宙を越えて); lit. "Beyond the Time ~Beyond the Möbius Universe~") is the 13th single by Japanese rock band TM Network, released on March 5, 1988 under Epic Records. Written by Mitsuko Komuro and Tetsuya Komuro, the song was used as the ending theme of the 1988 mecha anime film Mobile Suit Gundam: Char's Counterattack. It was also included in the band's sixth studio album Carol: A Day in a Girl's Life 1991.

The single peaked at No. 4 on Oricon's singles chart. It was nominated for the Gold Award at the 30th Japan Record Awards.

In 2018, the song was ranked No. 4 on NHK's "Announcement! All Gundam Big Vote" (発表!全ガンダム大投票, Happyō! Zen Gandamu Dai Tōhyō).

"Beyond the Time" was re-released as a digital single in 2025 and was used as the episode 11 ending theme of the series Mobile Suit Gundam GQuuuuuuX. The 2025 version hit No. 1 on Oricon's Digital Singles chart with over 7,600 downloads while the original 1988 version resurfaced to No. 5 with over 3,200 downloads.

== Track listing ==
All lyrics are written by Mitsuko Komuro; all music is composed and arranged by Tetsuya Komuro.

1988 Mini CD single
No.	Title	Length
1.	"Beyond the Time ~Möbius no Sora wo Koete~" ((BEYOND THE TIME (メビウスの宇宙を越えて); "Beyond the Time ~Beyond the Möbius Universe~"))	5:34
2.	"Beyond the Time" (Instrumental Mix)	5:36
Total length:		11:10

1988 7 inch vinyl single
No.	Title	Length
1.	"Beyond the Time ~Möbius no Sora wo Koete~"	4:52
2.	"Beyond the Time" (Instrumental Mix)	5:35
Total length:		10:27

2025 single
No.	Title	Length
1.	"Beyond the Time ~Möbius no Sora wo Koete~" (2025 Version)	5:31
2.	"Beyond the Time ~Möbius no Sora wo Koete~" (2025 Short Edit)	1:47
Total length:		7:18

== Personnel ==
- Tetsuya Komuro – keyboards
- Takashi Utsunomiya – lead vocals
- Naoto Kine – guitar

== Charts ==
Chart (1988)	Peak position
Japanese Oricon Singles	4

Chart (2025)	Peak position
Japanese Oricon Digital Singles	1

== Luna Sea version ==
"Beyond the Time ~Möbius no Sora wo Koete~"

Single by Luna Sea
- Language: Japanese
- English title: Beyond the Time ~Over the Möbius Skies~
- Released: September 6, 2019
- Recorded: 2019
- Genre: J-pop; alternative rock
- Length: 5:13
- Label: UMJ
- Composer: Tetsuya Komuro
- Lyricist: Mitsuko Komuro
- Producer: Luna Sea

Luna Sea singles chronology
"Sora no Uta ~Higher and Higher~/Hisōbi" (2019)	"Beyond the Time ~Möbius no Sora wo Koete~" (2019)	"Make a Vow" (2020)

Music videos
- "Beyond the Time ~Möbius no Sora wo Koete~" on YouTube

Japanese rock band Luna Sea covered the song as the third opening theme of the 2019 anime series Mobile Suit Gundam: The Origin: Advent of the Red Comet. Released digitally through Universal J on September 6, 2019, it peaked at number 79 on Billboard Japan's Japan Hot 100, but reached number 15 on their Hot Animation chart, which tracks anime and video game music. The song was also later included in a limited edition of their album Cross.

=== Track listing ===
No.	Title	Lyrics	Music	Length
1.	"Beyond the Time ~Möbius no Sora wo Koete~" ((BEYOND THE TIME (メビウスの宇宙を越えて); "Beyond the Time ~Over the Möbius Skies~"))	Mitsuko Komuro	Tetsuya Komuro	5:13

=== Charts ===
Chart (2019)	Peak position
Billboard Japan Hot 100	79
Billboard Japan Hot Animation	15

== Other cover versions ==
- Chie Nakamura covered the song on the 2008 various artists album Hyakka Seiren: Josei Seiyū-hen - 2.
- Starving Trancer feat. Hideki covered the song on the 2009 various artists album Exit Trance Presents Speed: Anime Trance Bitter.
- SawanoHiroyuki[nZk]:Aimer covered the song as a bonus track in the 2016 soundtrack album Mobile Suit Gundam RE:0096 Complete Best (Limited Edition).
- Hiroko Moriguchi covered the song on her 2019 album Gundam Song Covers. She re-recorded the song with TM Network on her 2022 album Gundam Song Covers 3.
- Nami Tamaki covered the song for the 2023 pachinko game P-Fever Mobile Suit Gundam: Char's Counterattack. The cover version was later released on her 2024 album Singularity.
- SawanoHiroyuki[nZk] featuring SennaRin covered the song on the 2024 compilation album TM Network Tribute Album: 40th Celebration. The cover version is also included as a bonus track on SennaRin's 2026 EP Lost and Found.
- Takanori Nishikawa covered the song on his 2025 album SINGularity III - VOYAGE -.

== See also ==
- 1988 in Japanese music
