= Rheme =

Rheme may refer to:

- In semiotics, a sign that represents its object with respect to quality; see Semiotic elements and classes of signs (Peirce) § Classes of signs
- In linguistics, what is being said about a topic; see Theme–rheme

== See also ==
- Rhema, a Greek word meaning a thing said
