= Forever (Luna Sea song) =

2026 single by Luna Sea

Single by Luna Sea
- Released: May 29, 2026
- Genre: Rock
- Length: 4:43
- Label: Avex Trax
- Songwriter: Luna Sea
- Producer: Luna Sea

Luna Sea singles chronology
"The Beyond" (2020)	"Forever" (2026)

"Forever" is the twenty-second single by Japanese rock band Luna Sea, released by Avex Trax on May 29, 2026. It is the band's first release of new material in six years and their first following the February 2026 death of Shinya, although his drums parts, which were recorded years earlier, are featured. It sold more than 10,500 copies and reached number four on both the Oricon Singles Chart and Billboard Japan's Top Singles Sales chart.

== Overview ==
After announcing that he had been diagnosed with a brain tumor in September 2025, Luna Sea drummer Shinya died on February 17, 2026. The band later announced that they would continue activities per his wishes. On April 17, Luna Sea announced "Forever" via a YouTube video where each band member discussed the song and their future. Vocalist Ryuichi estimated that bassist J had brought the song to the band five or ten years earlier, at which point Shinya helped create a demo tape.

The song was mixed by Steve Lillywhite, who previously produced Luna Sea's album Cross and mixed their self-cover versions of the albums Mother and Style. Lillywhite said working on the track was emotional, as he was fully aware that it was Shinya's final performance with Luna Sea, and called it one of his favorite songs by the band that he has worked on. The single's B-side, "Forever (Instrumental)", marks the first time Luna Sea included an instrumental version of one of their songs.

== Release ==
"Forever" was released on May 29, 2026. The cover art features a landscape image depicting a snow-covered inlet, illuminated by the morning sun, with five eagles flying through the sky, seemingly representing the five members of the band. It is Luna Sea's first new material in six years, following "Make a Vow", and their first single since 2020's "The Beyond".

On the same day the single was released, Luna Sea played the song live for the first time in their hometown of Hadano, Kanagawa, at the Hadano City Cultural Hall. It was the opening day of their sold-out Unending Journey -Forever- tour, which saw 33 shows in 22 cities, before ending on October 18. Each venue played on the tour featured an exclusive version of the "Forever" single with different cover art that was available exclusively to members of the band's fanclub. An additional four-date leg of the tour, subtitled To Rise, will take place in December at World Memorial Hall and Ariake Arena.

== Reception ==
"Forever" debuted at number four on both the Oricon Singles Chart and Billboard Japan's Top Singles Sales chart, with 10,594 copies sold. It peaked at number 78 on the Billboard Japan Hot 100.

Fumiaki Kurubayashi of Real Sound described "Forever" as having a "grand" feeling due to its strings and emotional vocals, and wrote that its beautiful melody conveys a determination to move forward after a period of sorrow, therefore signaling a new beginning for Luna Sea. His colleague Hiroko Goto, called the song a "straightforward, classic rock ballad", but noted Lillywhite's mix gives it a grandeur that sets it apart from the other ballads in the band's catalogue. She described Ryuichi's vocals as riding smoothly over Shinya's drum rhythms, Inoran's guitar tones as delicately coloring the track, while Sugizo's guitar solo overflows with emotion, and noted that J's bass provides a solid core while his powerful backing vocals leave a strong impact.

== Track listing ==
All songs written and composed by Luna Sea.

1. "Forever" - 4:43
  Originally composed by J.
2. "Forever (Instrumental)" - 4:43

== Personnel ==
Luna Sea

- Ryuichi – vocals
- Sugizo – guitar, violin
- Inoran – guitar
- J – bass
- Shinya – drums

Additional personnel

- Daisuke "d-kiku" Kikuchi – sound effects, programming
- Seiki Sato – strings arrangement
- Hiroaki Hayama – strings copyist
- Yui Strings – strings
- Steve Lillywhite – mixing
- Howie Weinberg – mastering
