= Arion (manga) =

Japanese manga series

- Fifth tankōbon volume cover, published in 1985.

アリオン
- Genre: Adventure; Epic
- Manga
- Written by: Yoshikazu Yasuhiko
- Published by: Tokuma Shoten
- Magazine: Monthly Comic Ryū
- Original run: May 20, 1979 – November 1, 1984
- Volumes: 5
- Anime film

Neo Heroic Fantasia: Arion
- Directed by: Yoshikazu Yasuhiko
- Produced by: Hideo Ogata; Tetsuhisa Yamada; Hironori Nakagawa
- Written by: Chiaki Kawamata (composition); Yoshikazu Yasuhiko, Akiko Tanaka (screenplay)
- Music by: Joe Hisaishi
- Studio: Nippon Sunrise
- Licensed by: NA: Discotek Media
- Released: March 15, 1986
- Runtime: 118 minutes

Arion (Japanese: アリオン) is a Japanese manga series written and illustrated by Yoshikazu Yasuhiko, published in Tokuma Shoten's seinen manga magazine Monthly Comic Ryū from May 1979 to November 1984, with its chapters collected in five tankōbon volumes. A young man kidnapped by Hades as a child and raised to believe that his mother was blinded by Zeus and that killing the ruler of Mount Olympus will cure her.

An anime feature film adaptation, directed by Yasuhiko and co-written with Akiko Tanaka, was released in 1986 under the title Neo Heroic Fantasia: Arion, (Note: Japanese: ネオ・ヒロイック・ファンタジア アリオン) and has been licensed by Discotek Media.

== Cast ==
- Shigeru Nakahara - Arion
- Miki Takahashi - Resphoina
- Mayumi Tanaka - Seneca
- Hirotaka Suzuoki - Apollo
- Masako Katsuki - Athena
- Chikao Ōtsuka - Hades
- Kiyoshi Kobayashi - Poseidon
- Masanobu Ōkubo - Zeus
- Ichirō Nagai - Lycaon
- Reiko Mutō - Demeter
- Hideyuki Tanaka - Prometheus
- Kazue Komiya - Arion (young)
- Ryōko Kinomiya - Gaia
- Toku Nishio - Gido
- Daisuke Gōri - Heracles
- Bin Shimada - Ares
- Takako Ōta - Pio
- Kōhei Miyauchi - Ethos
- Hisako Kyōda - Ethos' Wife
- Tomomichi Nishimura - Priest

== Publication ==
Written and illustrated by Yoshikazu Yasuhiko, Arion was serialized in Tokuma Shoten's seinen manga magazine Monthly Comic Ryū from May 20, 1979, to November 1, 1984. Tokuma Shoten collected its chapters in five tankōbon volumes, published from November 10, 1980, to January 10, 1985.

The manga has been licensed in France by publisher naBan, and in Taiwan by Tong Li Publishing.
