= Modes of persuasion =

Strategies of rhetoric

The modes of persuasion, modes of appeal, or rhetorical appeals (Greek: pisteis) are the broadest classifications of rhetorical devices, which a persuasive speaker or writer uses to convince their audience. Often, the modes of persuasion are directly equated with these three traditional rhetorical appeals: ethos, pathos, and logos—an appeal to the presenter's credibility, an appeal to audience emotions, and an appeal to reasoning or logic, respectively—all three of which appear in Aristotle's Rhetoric. There is also a less well-known fourth term, kairos (Ancient Greek: καιρός): appealing to the timeliness, or meaningfulness of the timing, of the presentation. Other factors Aristotle requires of strong rhetorical speakers are wisdom, virtue, and goodwill to better persuade their audience.

The three or four traditional modes of persuasion are present in fiction, in advertisements, on television, in flyers, in social media, and even on billboards on the side of the road. This type of persuasion can be seen in a simple conversation with family members or friends. Those might present at least one of the aspects of persuasion: logos, with numbers; pathos, with emotional appeal; ethos, with the authority of an entity; and kairos, in the right time or with some relation with them. Another important application of persuasion can be seen in public speeches. Those can be through a process called framing and reframing. This process gets its name because speakers need to use the correct words during a speech so their audience correctly understands their message. If a speaker wants to use a specific word, slang, or metaphor, they need to do a lot of research on their audience's background to understand the values and knowledge of their audience in order to persuade effectively.

In The Essential Guide to Rhetoric, William Keith and Christian Lundberg state that the three traditional forms of persuasion, ethos, pathos, and logos, combine to create the foundation of persuasive rhetorical communication. Ethos is the speaker's skill, personality, and delivery that establishes their credibility or moral appeal. Pathos uses the audience's identities, emotions, and values to create a sense of connection or shared emotion. Lastly, an appeal to reason and logic through the use of structure, logic, and evidence is known as logos. Instead of working alone, these arguments are frequently most effective when combined. Keith and Lundberg also stress the importance of rhetorical context and audience awareness when using these appeals. Knowing the values, beliefs, and expectations of an audience helps writers and speakers identify the best approaches. The authors also present the idea of the rhetorical situation, which consists of the audience, constraints, and exigencies (a problem or issue that needs attention). Understanding these elements allows rhetors to adjust their ethos, pathos, and logos appeals to better suit the audience's unique situation and concerns, which improves the communication's persuasive power.

== Ethos ==
Ethos (plural: ethea) is an appeal to the authority or credibility of the presenter. It is how well the presenter convinces the audience that the presenter is qualified to speak on the subject.

Aristotle acknowledged that the union between the speaker’s appearance, his reputation, and his ability to give the speech all add up to the meaning of Ethos.

This can be done by:

- Being a notable figure in the field in question, such as a college professor or an executive of a company whose business is related to the presenter's topic
- Demonstrating mastery of the terminology of the field (jargon)
- Being introduced by or producing bona fides from other established authorities

== Pathos ==
Pathos (plural: pathea) is an appeal to the audience's emotions. The terms sympathy, pathetic, and empathy are derived from it. It can be in the form of metaphor, simile, a passionate delivery, or even a simple claim that a matter is unjust. Pathos can be particularly powerful if used well, but most speeches do not solely rely on pathos. Pathos is most effective when the author or speaker demonstrates agreement with an underlying value of the reader or listener.

In addition, the speaker may use pathos and fear to sway the audience. Pathos may also include appeals to audience imagination and hopes, done when the speaker paints a scenario of positive future results of following the course of action proposed. It is also related to the mood or the tone of a speech and the skill that the speaker possesses in harnessing the emotional side of the audience. Aristotle connected this skill with virtues like courage, wisdom, and generosity as ways that the speaker or any other person can use to appeal to his/her or their audience's emotions.

In some cases, downplaying the ethos can be done while emphasizing pathos, for example as William Jennings Bryan did in his Cross of Gold speech:

I would be presumptuous, indeed, to present myself against the distinguished gentlemen to whom you have listened if this were but a measuring of ability; but this is not a contest among persons. The humblest citizen in all the land when clad in the armor of a righteous cause is stronger than all the whole hosts of error that they can bring. I come to speak to you in defense of a cause as holy as the cause of liberty—the cause of humanity.

— William Jennings Bryan

== Logos ==
Logos (plural: logoi) is logical appeal or the simulation of it, and the term logic is derived from it. It is normally used to describe facts and figures that support the speaker's claims or thesis. There are also more traditional forms of logical reasoning, such as syllogisms and enthymemes. Logos is also related to the rational appeal that speakers use to persuade their audience through the usage of patterns, such as facts, statistics, and data, also known as informational processing. Aristotle believed that those who used persuasion should use those forms of logical reasoning.

Having a logos appeal also enhances ethos because information makes the speaker look knowledgeable and prepared to their audience. However, the data can be confusing and thus confuse the audience. Logos can also be misleading or inaccurate, however meaningful it may seem to the subject at hand. In some cases, inaccurate, falsified, or misconstrued data can even be used to enact a pathos effect. Such is the case with casualty numbers, which, while not necessarily falsified, may include minor casualties (injuries) that are equated with deaths in the mind of an audience and therefore can evoke the same effect as a death toll.

== Kairos ==
Kairos (plural: kairoi) is an arguable fourth mode of persuasion which means the "right time", "season" or "opportunity". Kairos is an appeal to the timeliness or context in which a presentation is publicized, which includes contextual factors external to the presentation itself but still capable of affecting the audience's reception to its arguments or messaging, such as the time in which a presentation is taking place, the place in which an argument or message is being made, the background information and demographics of an audience such as age, culture, faith, creed, etc., the appropriateness of the speaker's tone given the nature of the occasion, and the relationship between the speaker, the audience and the topic.

It is also important for speakers to be aware of events that might happen during the moment of a speech, like outside noise, the technology that can be used during the event, or the weather conditions on the day, so it can be easier for to connect with the audience and not be disturbed during the speech.

An example would be an outdated advertisement that would have been effective 40 years ago but hasn't aged well by today's standards. If both the advertisement made 40 years ago and the exact same advertisement made today contain the same speaker with the same credentials (ethos), and the same arguments with the same logic (logos), and they both appeal to the same emotions and the same values (pathos), but the reception is completely different, then what has changed is the context in which the presentation was made (kairos).

== "Arguments and Persuasion" by Keith and Lundberg ==
The main argument put forward by Keith and Lundberg throughout the course of this chapter was that rhetoric is not force or manipulation but rather a systematic thought-out method of persuasion. They go on to talk about Aristotle's three frameworks and how they can be used to appeal or make an argument: logos (proof), ethos (credibility), and pathos (emotions). Tools for finding arguments, otherwise known as Topoi, are also examined in the chapter. The authors differentiate two different kinds of topoi: general (which is used in universal arguments) and special (which is more content specific arguments). Finally, the passage discusses stock issues and the following important frameworks of it: presumption and burden of proof, legal stock issues, and policy stock issues. All in all, the text explains the various tools used in persuasion and how effective they can be if used correctly.
