= Mobile Suit Gundam: Char's Counterattack (soundtrack) =

Mobile Suit Gundam: Char's Counterattack (Original Soundtrack)

Soundtrack album by Shigeaki Saegusa
- Released: March 13, 1988
- Recorded: 1987
- Studios: Sound City; Sedic; Aoi Studio; Avaco Creative Studio
- Genres: Film score; J-pop; synth-pop
- Length: 52:33
- Language: Japanese
- Label: Epic Records
- Producers: Yukio Nagasaki; Masahiro Oji; Tetsuya Komuro; Yōji Kōsaka

Singles from Mobile Suit Gundam: Char's Counterattack (Original Soundtrack)
- 1. "Beyond the Time ~Möbius no Sora wo Koete~" Released: March 5, 1988

Alternative cover
- 25th Anniversary Limited Edition cover

Mobile Suit Gundam: Char's Counterattack (Original Soundtrack) (機動戦士ガンダム 逆襲のシャア オリジナル・サウンドトラック, Kidō Senshi Gandamu Gyakushū no Shā Orijinaru Saundotorakku) is the soundtrack album to the anime film of the same name, released by Epic Records on May 13, 1988. The album features the film's orchestral score by Shigeaki Saegusa, plus the ending theme "Beyond the Time ~Möbius no Sora wo Koete~" by TM Network. For the film's 25th anniversary, the soundtrack was re-released by GT Music on June 11, 2014, in two editions: single CD with 10 bonus tracks, and 3-CD box set. On February 18, 2023, a limited edition red vinyl LP was released to commemorate the film's 35th anniversary.

== Track listing ==
All music is composed by Shigeaki Saegusa, except where indicated.

Side A
No.	Title	Length
1.	"Main Title (メイン・タイトル, Mein Taitoru)"	4:44
2.	"Segment I: Quess Paraya (クェス・パラヤ, Kuesu Paraya)"	3:32
3.	"Segment II: Neo Zion (ネオ・ジオン軍, Neo Jion-gun)"	4:00
4.	"Segment III: Sally (出撃, Shutsugeki)"	2:38
5.	"Segment IV: Rondo Bell (ロンド・ベル隊, Rondo Beru-tai)"	3:10
6.	"Segment V: Swan (白鳥, Shiratori)"	3:40
7.	"Segment VI: ν Gundam (ニュー・ガンダム, Nyū Gandamu)"	4:31

Side B
No.	Title	Lyrics	Music	Artist	Length
8.	"Segment VII: Anxiety (不安, Fuan)"				2:34
9.	"Segment VIII: Mission (使命, Shimei)"				2:58
10.	"Segment IX: Axcis (惑星アクシズ, Wakusei Akushizu)"				2:14
11.	"Segment X: Sacrifice (犠牲, Gisei)"				3:05
12.	"Segment XI: Combat (格闘, Kakutō)"				4:44
13.	"Segment XII: Destiny (宿命, Shukumei)"				3:08
14.	"Segment XIII: Aurora (オーロラ, Ōrora)"				2:43
15.	"Beyond the Time ~Möbius no Sora wo Koete~ (BEYOND THE TIME ～メビウスの宇宙を越えて～, BEYOND THE TIME ~Mebiusu no Sora wo Koete~; "Beyond the Time ~Beyond the Möbius Universe~")"	Mitsuko Komuro	Tetsuya Komuro	TM Network	4:52

25th Anniversary single disc bonus tracks
No.	Title	Length
16.	"M2"	1:37
17.	"M6"	1:15
18.	"M7"	1:57
19.	"M13"	0:48
20.	"M14"	1:20
21.	"M18: Warera ga Negai (我等が願い, "Our Prayers")" (Instrumental)	0:43
22.	"M19"	1:30
23.	"M22"	1:03
24.	"M24"	1:26
25.	"M26"	1:25
Total length:		66:02

25th Anniversary Limited Edition disc 2: Bonus Tracks + Unreleased Original Takes
No.	Title	Length
1.	"M2"	1:37
2.	"M6"	1:15
3.	"M7"	1:58
4.	"M13"	0:48
5.	"M14"	1:20
6.	"M18: Warera ga Negai" (Instrumental)	0:43
7.	"M19"	1:30
8.	"M22"	1:04
9.	"M24"	1:27
10.	"M26"	1:28
11.	"M44 Variation (M44 ヴァリエーション, M44 Variēshon)"	1:24
12.	"M44 Variation 2 (M44 ヴァリエーション2, M44 Variēshon 2)"	0:52
13.	"M29: Another Take (M29 別テイク, M29 Betsu Teiku)"	1:42
14.	"M29: Another Take 2 (M29 別テイク2, M29 Betsu Teiku 2)"	1:37
15.	"M11 Variation (M11 ヴァリエーション, M11 Variēshon)"	1:53
16.	"M20" (Stereo)	1:16
17.	"M35, 36: Another Take (M35,36 別テイク, M35, 36 Betsu Teiku)" (No Drums, Bass)	2:18
18.	"M35, 36: Another Take" (Tempo Slow)	2:23
19.	"M40: Another Take (M40 別テイク, M40 Betsu Teiku)"	1:14
20.	"M42: Another Take (M42 別テイク, M42 Betsu Teiku)"	0:29
21.	"M45"	1:57

25th Anniversary Limited Edition disc 3: Film Synchronization Edit
No.	Title	Lyrics	Music	Artist	Length
1.	"M1 (M35, 36, 1)"				1:40
2.	"M2 (M2)"				1:02
3.	"M3 (M44)"				1:01
4.	"M4 (M5)"				1:25
5.	"M5 (M6)"				1:20
6.	"M6 (M7)"				1:00
7.	"M7 (M8A)"				1:06
8.	"M8 (M28, 31)"				1:18
9.	"M9 (M43, M31)"				1:28
10.	"M10 (M10)"				1:20
11.	"M11 (M11)"				1:52
12.	"M12 (M12)"				1:03
13.	"M13 (M13)"				0:49
14.	"M13" (M2)"				0:45
15.	"M14 (M14)"				1:21
16.	"M15 (M15)"				2:09
17.	"M17 (M17)"				1:59
18.	"M19 (M19)"				1:38
19.	"M20 (M20 Mono)"				0:50
20.	"M21 (M21)"				1:35
21.	"M22 (M22)"				0:54
22.	"M23 (M23)"				2:18
23.	"M24 (M24)"				0:56
24.	"M25 (M25)"				1:03
25.	"M26 (M26)"				1:21
26.	"M27 (M27)"				1:07
27.	"M28 (M28, 31)"				2:06
28.	"M29 (M8B, M28, M31)"				1:51
29.	"M31 (M28, 31)"				2:13
30.	"M32 (M32, 33)"				0:49
31.	"M33 (M32, 33)"				0:56
32.	"M34 (M34)"				1:30
33.	"M35 (M35, 36)"				1:05
34.	"M36 (M36)"				1:46
35.	"M37 (M24)"				1:04
36.	"M38-1 (M32, 33)"				0:13
37.	"M38-2 (M38, 39)"				2:07
38.	"M39-1"				0:36
39.	"M39-2"				0:56
40.	"M40 (M40)"				1:09
41.	"M42 (M15)"				1:19
42.	"M43 (M43)"				1:53
43.	"M44 (M44): Cut (M44 (M44)Cutあり, M44 (M44) Cut ari)"				1:14
44.	"M46B (M46B)"				2:00
45.	"Theme Vocal Beyond the Time Ending Edit (テーマVocal BEYOND THE TIME MOVIE ENDING EDIT)"	M. Komuro	T. Komuro	TM Network	3:21
