= The Beyond (song) =

- Cover of the CD

Single by Luna Sea

from the album Cross
- Released: April 29, 2020
- Genre: Alternative rock
- Length: 5:33
- Label: Universal
- Songwriter: Luna Sea
- Producers: Luna Sea, Steve Lillywhite

Luna Sea singles chronology
"Sora no Uta ~Higher and Higher~/Hisōbi" (2019)	"The Beyond" (2020)	"Forever" (2026)

Music video
- "The Beyond" on YouTube

"The Beyond" is the twenty-first single by Japanese rock band Luna Sea, released on April 29, 2020. Despite receiving a limited production amount, it became the band's first in over 20 years to top the Oricon Singles Chart.

== Overview ==
Like several other songs that would be included on the December 2019 album Cross, "The Beyond" is related to the Gundam media franchise. It was used as the official theme of the franchise's 40th anniversary. This was announced at a press conference on November 21, 2018, where Sugizo performed the song on violin.

At co-producer Steve Lillywhite's suggestion, Sugizo added a counter-melody at the song's second chorus for Inoran to play.

A music video for the song was uploaded to YouTube on May 29, 2020, as the start of one of the band's 30th anniversary projects that saw them upload one music video a day for 30 days. Luna Sea performed "The Beyond" at the December 18, 2020 opening ceremony of the Gundam Factory Yokohama, which was broadcast live on TV. It marked their first performance in about 10 months since their tour was postponed due to the COVID-19 pandemic.

== Release ==
The single's official full title is "The Beyond Gunpla 40th Edition The Beyond x MS-06 Zaku II Ver. Luna Sea" and it was released as a box that contains a CD of the song "The Beyond" and a custom Luna Sea version Zaku II Gundam model, or Gunpla. The model commemorates the 40th anniversary of Gundam and the 30th anniversary of the band. Due to Sugizo's eco-consciousness, it was the first in the Master Grade series to use recycled eco-friendly plastic. The single was released on April 29, 2020, and sold exclusively at Tsutaya Records and the Universal Music Store. Its cover art features the Luna Sea Gundam drawn by Yoshikazu Yasuhiko, character designer of the franchise.

In addition to being previously included on Luna Sea's album Cross, "The Beyond" was later included in June 2020's Mobile Suit Gundam 40th Anniversary Album ~Beyond~.

== Chart performance ==
"The Beyond" became Luna Sea's first single in 20 years and one month, since "Gravity" (2000), to top the Oricon Singles Chart. This marks the second-longest interval between number ones for a music act in the chart's history, behind only Mariya Takeuchi's 21 years and one month, which took place just a few months earlier. It also topped Oricon's new Rock Singles Chart, and came in twentieth on their combined digital download and streaming singles chart.

== Track listing ==
All songs written and composed by Luna Sea.

1. "The Beyond" - 5:33
  Originally composed by Sugizo.
