= Rhema (doctrine) =

Specific sayings of Jesus (as distinguished from the general logos)

While both rhema and logos are translated into the English 'word', in the original Greek there was a substantial distinction. The use of the term rhema has special significance in some Christian groups, especially those advocating the Five-Fold Ministry that God gave of five gifts (Ephesians 4:11) or callings to some people. Christian denominations that advocate the Five-Fold Ministry include Charismatic Christianity, the Pentecostal Movement, the Apostolic-Prophetic Movement and the Word of Faith Movement.

== Epistemology ==
Some Christians, such as Apostolic-Prophetic Movement Christian minister and author Bill Hamon, put forward the position that rhema is a process within Christian epistemology. In this understanding, the logos is universal for all humanity, while any intellectual changes for a specific individual believer are categorized as rhema. Under this system, rhema is a broad term that includes many types of spiritual interaction; "any method God uses to reveal His specific will to an individual, whether by divinely directed desire, illumination, revelation, vision, or dream. ...rhema will be our general term to refer to all of these means of God communicating His specific will to an individual." Hamon states, "A rhema is an inspired Word birthed within your own spirit, a whisper from the Holy Spirit like the still, small voice that spoke to Elijah in the cave. It is a divinely inspired impression upon your soul, a flash of thought or a creative idea from God. It is conceived in your spirit, but birthed into your natural understanding by divine illumination. A true rhema carries with it a deep inner assurance and witness of the Spirit."

Citing John 1:1,14 Hamon holds "Jesus was the eternal Word revealed and manifest in mortal flesh" and can be called by the personal name "Logos". Citing Timothy 2:15, Hamon defines the less personal usage, logos, as "the Scriptures as a whole". He defines rhema as "a specific word from the Lord that applies it to us individually. ...The Logos is like a well of water, and the rhema is a bucket of water from that well. ...Truth is truth, and the Logos and rhema are one with God." The logos "is the standard of all truth...the rhema, [is that] which provides the precise word needed for the specific situation. All Christians must live by the logos and receive the rhema as needed." Under this definition the method of receiving rhemas "may come by many ways. A rhema may come while reading the Bible, as God quickens a certain text, or it may come to us through the spoken words of another person."

In support of this Hamon cites Ephesians 6:17: "take the sword of the Spirit, which is the word (rhema) of God", and points to William Edwy Vine's An Expository Dictionary of New Testament Words that explains the passage "Here the reference is not to the whole Bible as such, but to the individual scripture which the Spirit brings to our remembrance for use in time of need, a prerequisite being the regular storing of the mind with scripture". Hamon, expounding on Romans 10:17, goes on to say that a rhema is "that timely, Holy Spirit-inspired Word from the Logos that brings life, power, and faith to perform and fulfil it...[it] must be received with faith by the hearer in order for it to fulfil its mission."

Pentecostal minister and author Jack W. Hayford shares similar sentiments, saying:

"Jesus is the living Logos (John 1:1), the Bible is the written logos (Heb. 4:12), and the Holy Spirit utters the spoken logos (1 Cor. 2:13). ...The meaning of rhema in distinction to logos is illustrated in Ephesians 6:17, where the reference is not to the Scriptures as a whole, but to that portion which the believer wields as a sword in the time of need."

Christian writer Watchman Nee, writing along the same lines, wrote:

In Matthew 4:4 Jesus said, '"It is written, 'Man shall not live on bread alone, but on every rhema that proceeds out through the mouth of God."' ...Can we say that man shall not live by bread alone, but by the Word of God recorded in the Bible? No. We are not saying that the written Word of God is of no use, but that logos—the Word of God recorded in the Bible—is of no use to us by itself. ...Both logos and rhema are the Word of God, but the former is God's Word objectively recorded in the Bible, while the latter is the word of God spoken to us at a specific occasion.

According to Nee a passage of the logos can move into being rhema if it becomes shown to apply to the specific individual. As an example, Nee holds the statement in Scripture at John 3:16 "that whoever believes in Him shall not perish but have eternal life" is held to have moved from logos to become rhema if the believer feels a realization that the passage is saying to them "It is I who will not perish and it is I who even now have eternal life." According to Nee, at such an instance "God speaks the word to us, and at the same moment, we have faith. ...This does not mean that logos is of no use...for without logos, we could never have rhema. All the rhema of God is based upon logos."

=== Possible link to Hebrew term memra ===
Professor of biblical studies Shirley Christian links the Greek word rhema to the use of the Hebrew word memra which was used in rabbinic Judaism since before the advent of Christianity. She takes special note of the use of memra in the Targum, "where it is used when speaking of God's expression of Himself. ...[and] figures constantly as the manifestation of the divine power. When God inspires a prophetic Word, this Rhema carries with it, the power to produce the result."

She cites The Jewish Encyclopedia on the matter, and it states that memra

"commonly denotes the speech addressed to patriarch or prophet" but "frequently it denotes also the creative word". This leads to a reading where "'The Word,' heard and announced by the prophet, often became, in the conception of the seer, an efficacious power apart from God, as was the angel or messenger of God: 'The Lord sent a word into Jacob, and it hath lighted upon Israel'[Isaiah 9:8]; 'He sent his word, and healed them' (Psalm 107:20); and compare 'his word runneth very swiftly' (Psalm 147:15)."

The Encyclopedia also notes that memra "becomes more and more a personified agency" in the biblical apocrypha and rabbinic literature, and in the Targum it "figures constantly as the manifestation of the divine power, or as God's messenger in place of God Himself, wherever the predicate is not in conformity with the dignity or the spirituality of the Deity."

== Bible incidents ==
Bill Hamon holds that while the Bible has much truth that is "universally valid...the general word which is the eternal logos for everyone"; there are also "personal prophecies which were given to individuals or groups, and are not universally valid" - these are "the rhema of personal prophecy in the Bible" they are instances of messages to "specific instructions [that] are not for everyone". Examples he cites are YHWH's instructions for Noah to build an Ark, for Abraham to sacrifice Isaac, for Hosea to marry a harlot, for Isaiah to walk around naked for three years, and Jacob receiving prophetic words about the descendants of his sons.

Watchman Nee uses additional examples such as the Annunciation, where Mary tells the angel "May it happen to me according to your rhema." Nee also points to Simeon who had been granted to live till he saw the birth of the Messiah, once seeing the baby Jesus he says "Now You release Your slave, Master, according to Your rhema, in peace." He points to the calling of John the Baptist in Luke 3:2 "the rhema of God came to John the son of Zachariah in the wilderness." Nee also points to Peter's memory after his denial of Jesus as a rhema – "The rhema was that which was brought to his remembrance. While Peter was telling a lie, suddenly rhema came. The very sentence of the Lord came to him. Rhema is the word which the Lord has spoken, and now He speaks it again."

Nee points to where Simon Peter on the fishing boat says to Jesus "Master, through the whole night we toiled and caught nothing; but based on Your rhema I will let down the nets." Nee says "The 'word' in this verse was something spoken by the Lord for that occasion. It was the Lord speaking personally to Simon." Nee points to when Peter is told "Come" by Jesus walking on the water "If someone attempted to walk on the sea because of Matthew 14:29, he would certainly sink. This is not the word which the Lord is speaking today, though He did speak it on that day. It is true that the word spoken by God in the past and the word He speaks today carry the same authority; they have never changed. But the important thing is this: Is God speaking that very word to us today?"

Nee says these events were not "according to a certain chapter or a certain verse in the Bible, but it was according to the word spoken" to these individuals, and "Only the word which the Lord speaks to us is of any use. The rhema reveals something to us personally and directly; it shows us what we need to deal with and what we need to be cleansed from. We must specifically seek after this very matter, because our Christian life is based on this rhema. ...We must remember that today's Christianity is still the Christianity of personal revelation. If the Lord does not speak within man, it is not Christianity, nor is it the New Testament."

== As hermeneutical inspiration ==
Hamon differentiates between "the illuminating work of the Holy Spirit to bring out the deeper and greater meaning of Scripture [which] is a personal event" and personal prophecy "God's revelation of His thoughts and intents to a particular person, family, or group of people. It is specific information coming from the mind of God for a specific situation, an inspired word directed to a certain audience...a word from the Word". Still, within his ontology as both these spiritual encounters happen to specific individuals their occurrence are both classified as receiving rehma.

Hamon says "God sometimes reveal His Will by a rhema from 'out of the clear blue.' But at other times we receive it by an illumination of a particular Scripture. As we read God sends a quickening rhema that says, 'This applies to you.' ...This type of divine directive may also be called 'revelation knowledge' or 'Scriptural illumination.'" Hamon holds "Jesus received direction for His ministry that way". He cites Luke 4:16-21 were Jesus reads a scroll of Isaiah in the Nazareth synagogue and "Unrolling it, he found the place where it is written [the text of Isaiah 61:1-2;58:6]...Then he rolled up the scroll...[and began] by saying to them, 'Today this scripture is fulfilled in your hearing.'"

Concerning receiving deeper understanding of Scripture from the Holy Spirit Hamon says "The Bible give the factual knowledge of God, His Word, Will and Way, His plan and purpose for mankind. Fact, however, is not faith. But, fact (Scripture) can become faith when it is quickened by the Holy Spirit and mixed with heart belief. The writer of Hebrews revealed this truth when he said, 'The word [logos] did not profit them, not being mixed with faith in them that heard it' (Heb. 4:2). The Logos plus the Holy Spirit quickening and faith equals a rhema from the Lord."

Hamon goes on to say "there is a big difference between preaching and personal prophecy; between quoting the logos and speaking a rhema; between speaking faith statements based on scriptural truth and speaking the specific mind of the Lord for that individual: between speaking the Word of God and speaking a word from the Lord."

Hamon says "Paul declared that faith for specific miracles come not from our opinions but rather from a rhema from the Logos: 'Faith comes by hearing and hearing by the rhema of God' (Rom. 10:17). ...the rhema spoken from our mouth has to come from our heart as a rhema in order to be effective: 'The rhema is nigh thee even in your heart and mouth, that is the rhema of faith' (Rom. 10:8)." Citing Hebrews 4:2 Hamon states "The Bible gives the factual knowledge of God, His Word, Will and Way, His plan and purpose for mankind. Fact, however is not faith. But, fact (Scripture) can become faith when it is quickened by the Holy Spirit and mixed with heart belief."

"The logos plus the Holy Spirit quickening and faith equals a rhema form the Lord. As a minister I preach the Logos, but as a prophet I prophesy the rhema. General biblical truth does not guarantee specific application and appropriation of that truth. A preacher speaks from the letter of the Word which applies to all men for all time, while the prophet speaks from the Spirit of the Word which is personalized to a particular person for a specific situation."

== As cleansing ==
Nee wrote "In the eternal plan of God the church is without sin. ...In what way will Christ bring the church into perfection? He will do it by cleansing her with the washing of the water in the word--the rhema." Nee holds that Jesus used his physical life to provide redemption from sin and "Christ is using His life in His word, His rhema, to cleanse us." Nee says the Church's "defect is not that the Christ whom she has received is too little, but that she has too many things other than Christ. The church in God's will comes entirely out of Christ, without any sin, without any flesh, and containing no natural life. ...Every one of who truly belongs to Christ has a certain portion which is solely and wholly Christ. ...In addition to this portion, we still have many things which are not of Christ. We need to be cleansed because of all these other things. ...Many times we do not know in which aspect we need to be cleansed. But one day the life within us will not let us go. Before long His rhema comes into us, indicating what must be dealt with."

Nee states that this being held back can occur even when "we are engaged in something which seems quite good according to doctrine, and our reason for doing it is also quite right, but within there is something which keeps touching us and will not let us go. Eventually, the Lord speaks to us; rhema comes, the mighty word of the Lord. It tells us that a certain matter must be dealt with and cleansed. ...If we have any inner feeling in life, we should never let it go. We must pray, 'Lord, please give the rhema that I might know how to deal with this situation.' ...If we pay attention to these matters and do not take them lightly, the Lord will cleanse us by the washing of the water in the word that we may be sanctified. ...The natural life and all that is not out of Christ must be purged away. Sanctification can only come after cleansing, and the basis of cleansing is the Lord's word, the rhema. If we do not know the Lord's word, there is no way for us to be cleansed and sanctified."

Nee holds that to be truly Christian one can not rely on "an outward source" but "an inward one" in order to "understand the will of God from within" and not have "His will still something outside of us". By means of believers inward reception of rhema "He [Jesus] intends to restore and recover them to what He proposed in eternity past, so that He might have that which fulfills His desire in eternity future. In his magnificent work, the Lord is using the words He speaks as the instrument to bring the church back to God's original purpose."

In this Nee maintains "All doctrine, teaching, theology, and knowledge are of little use if they just flow from one person to another. True growth depends upon our receiving the word directly from God. God is using His rhema to do His work, and He desires to speak to us. Therefore, if our purpose in reading the Scriptures is solely for knowledge, it is indeed pitiful. If this is so, we are finished. The real value of the Scriptures is that God can speak to man through them. If we desire to be useful in the Lord's hands, we must be spoken to by the Lord. Whether or not our building is spiritual depends upon whether the Lord has spoken to us. Knowledge and doctrine are of no spiritual use. Only the Lord's speaking in us is of spiritual value. ...Only rhema is of any value. If we do something just because others tell us to do it, we are keeping the law; we are not in the New Testament."

Nee holds that "knowledge of the Scriptures and understanding of the doctrine" are not spirituality, "Bible knowledge can never be a substitute for spirituality. Only God's speaking to us, personally and directly is of any real value. ...We need to know what is dead and what is living, what is mere knowledge and what is spiritual. Whatever is not living has no spiritual value. If we have rhema, the living word of God, we can be cleansed and sanctified."

Nee states that by this use of rhema Ephesians 5:25-27 will be fulfilled and Jesus will "sanctify and cleanse it [the Church] with the washing of water by the word (rhema). That he might present it to Himself a glorious Church, not having spot, or wrinkle, or any such thing; but that it should be holy and without blemish." Nee holds that by rhema Jesus will "bring the Church to the stage where there is nothing old, where there is nothing of the past. He wants everything in the church to be new. ...it should be holy and blameless. God will bring the Church to the place where nothing can be said against her in any respect." At that point the world, Satan, or "even God Himself will have nothing to say. In that day, when the Church is so glorious, she will become the Bride of Christ." Nee holds believers "are Christ's own Body. As His Body, Christ is purging and preparing us...Now we are in the process of being cleansed. Now is the time that we need the rhema.

Dr. Shirley Christian states that sometimes when a minister is preaching will result in "the Spirit of God quickening the logos and it becomes a rhema to the person...[which] brings the healing." She notes "Often a person with a ministry to multitudes observes this type of healing manifestation. The minister may then ask any that were healed as the Word was proclaimed and the anointing released to come forward to testify."

== Personal prophecies ==
Hamon holds that personal prophecies are rhemas and while the prophecy of the logos never fails, "the Bible is full of rhemas given to individuals which failed to come to pass. Actually...it was not the rhema of the Lord which failed, but rather the people who heard it failed to understand, interpret, believe, obey, respond, wait upon, or act upon it according to God's will and way. This is the meaning of 1 Corinthians 13:8: 'Prophecies shall fail.' When God speaks directly or through a prophet to a person or a nation, and they fail to respond appropriately, the prophecy may not come to pass." He also holds that as they come from the same divine source "No true rhema spoken by a present-day prophet will be in conflict with the spirit and context of the logos. ...Preaching proclaims the logos, while prophecy gives rhema from the Logos. Both are the word of God."

Hamon holds that a believer willing to be an instrument of prophecy can error if they focus on universal truths of logos, such as "divine healing is a scriptural truth" rather than waiting to receive a rhema. In such a case if a believer claims they have a personal prophecy to deliver to another saying "'God showed me you are going to be healed,' or 'Thus saith the Lord I have healed you and you shall live and not die.'" But if that person prophesied to dies this "presumptuous prophesying will also bring reproach on the gift of prophecy, the ministry of prophesying, and the office of the prophet" because they are "doctrinally-directed, instead of divinely inspired, prophecies".

Along these lines Nee wrote "We will always treasure the fact that the Lord still speaks today. He not only spoke in the Scriptures, He not only spoke to Paul and John, He is also speaking to us today. Whenever someone who is working for the Lord stand up to speak for Him, he must expect the rhema. If the Lord does not speak to us today, we are really failures. How many times have we preached, yet the Lord did not speak a word? It is not that there was something wrong with the message, but it was all the general word of the Lord; there was no rhema in it. The problem with the church today is that it lacks the living word of the Lord; instead there are only dead doctrines. There is only a passing on of man's preaching. ...Only when we have rhema can we move ahead and have the living water to supply to others. What we need is rhema."

Dr. Shirley Christian also holds that "The Prophetic Word will bring healing, miracles, deliverance and wholeness." She holds "so-called prophecy spoken from a knowledge of the Word...is presumption" and what is required is "rather a true prophetic Word filled with he Spirit and life--one directly from God. When God gives a word of knowledge, word of wisdom or a prophetic Word on healing, it becomes the Rhema that is filled with Spirit and life. The Rhema Word has within it, the spiritual seed that releases faith, life and power. Its fulfilment is accomplished through the operation of the Holy Spirit. ...The Lord's will is clear on healing, and we preach and teach it from the Scriptures. A minister may believe strongly and speak from his/her faith using a scripture--this Word, if not prophetic, may miss the mark if not united with the sick one's faith. But when such a one receives a personal prophecy, a true prophetic Word form the Lord, it contains life-giving power to accomplish the miraculous." She holds "a Rhema word" is "receiving a download from God for a person or the Spirit of God directly". She holds that Elisha sent such a rhema to Naaman in 2 Kings 5:10 and when he obeyed this "the Word came to pass." She goes on to say "In the New Testament, prophets are also active in speaking a Rhema and accomplishing healing--and this continues today." She holds that through rhema, prophets today are able to fulfil the mission Jesus laid out in Luke 4:18 including "recovery of sight for the blind". Citing Isaiah 50:4 she holds that prophets today can have "the Spirit of Counsel" come upon them and they can speak "a Word of deliverance prophetically for someone", which results in "inner healing begins to manifest in the person." She calls on believers to follow 2 Chronicles 20:20 and "Put your trust in His prophets and succeed."

Hamon holds that in cases where statements about healing were believed to be rhema but fail it was because "personal conviction of the scriptural truth of divine healing" has interfered with receiving actual rhema for the sick individual and "This is the main reason so many words given as a personal prophecy or rhema fail to come to pass... The main problems are mindset, soul blockage and doctrinal domination that keep us from being Holy Spirit-directed." A believer wanting to be a conduit for prophecy must also be "earnestly and sincerely seeking God about the matter" and be wary of their "own wishful thinking and imagination." To overcome these obstacles Hamon holds there is a "need of prophets being trained and under apprenticeship to an older mature prophet—as Elisha was to Elijah". Failed rhema makes it so a prophet may "justly be judged and proclaimed a false representative of the mind of God in the matter"; but it does not automatically mean that person is a false prophet it is "rather his immaturity, zeal, and biblical convictions had motivated him to give a presumptuous prophecy" and should "be a humbling, learning process to prepare him to be a mature prophet."

Citing Deuteronomy 17:6; 19:15 and 2 Corinthians 13:1, Hamon holds that "the scriptural requirement that everything must be confirmed in the mouth of two or three witnesses before accepting the fact...can be applied to a word of counsel, a word of prophecy, or a rhema word. Just as the general Will of God cannot be established by a single verse, neither can the specific Will of God be established by one prophecy, one rhema, one counselor, or one anything else. ...He [YHWH] insists that in all serious matters there be at least two and preferably three witnesses before you accept a prophetic word."

== Finding rhema ==
In some Christian groups (such as Daybreak Resources) rhema is defined as "God's Word Spoken to You". One of the methods to find rhema is for the believer to look over lists of scriptural passages that are grouped by themes and choose one "that stands out from the list for you." The believer is then to "Read it slowly and quietly (as in "hagah" meditation)." The believer is to read the prayer repeatedly until a few lines hold their attention, and then slowly and quietly repeat those lines with closed eyes until "this scripture will root in you and other words will begin to rise from your heart and interact with the scripture." Which are taken to mean "God is speaking to you and you are speaking to Him." The believer is said to "experience the confidence of this communication." In this way the believer is held to experience that "The Word has become rhema in your heart and you are praying a scripture that is alive and active in you." Any spontaneous prayers should be recorded for future use.

Along these lines Nee writes that "Luke 24:8 says, 'They remembered His words (rhema),'" similarly "In Acts 11:16 Peter said, 'And I remembered the word of the Lord, how He said, John baptised in water, but you shall be baptised in the Holy Spirit.' While Peter was preaching to the household of Cornelius, the Spirit of the Lord fell upon them, and the word of the Lord came to Peter. It was not that Peter tried to recall the word from his memory [of the events of Acts 1:5], but it was the Lord who spoke to him, 'John baptized with water, but you shall be baptised in the Holy Spirit.'" Nee holds that this is because "Rhema is something the Lord has spoken previously which He is now speaking again. In other words, rhema is the word which the Lord speaks the second time. This is something living."

Jamee Rae at Sharefaith echoes these sentiments "Through daily reading of God's Word, which is referred to as the logos, Christians will have knowledge of God and be able to memorize Scripture and to offer non-believers the truth that is written. But in addition to that, God wants to speak to His people and provide insight beyond human understanding. With the help of the Holy Spirit, portions of Scripture that were once words on a page will become rhema. They will have great significance and offer supernatural guidance, comfort, answers and assurances. Intermittent rhema from Scripture is good, but daily rhema will guide a Christian's steps and move them toward greater understanding, revelation and joy."

Other Christian groups also hold that reading the Bible can bring rhemas to the believer, such as the Advanced Training Institute International who teach "In the regular course of our daily reading of God's Word (logos), we need to ask God to speak to us through His Word and give us insight into it. The Holy Spirit can cause certain passages to stand out with significant meaning or application for our lives. These are the rhemas of Scripture and should become a part of our daily thoughts and actions."

== Criticism ==
Non-charismatic Christian groups can take issue with the Charismatic Christians having rhema doctrines.

Arise My Love Ministries also questions rhema doctrine on this point. They state that according to the doctrine the fulfillment of a statement declared to be a rhema and spoken to a receiving believer has to be accepted in absolute faith for there to be a possibility of it coming to pass and that "teaches that failed, false or 'unfulfilled' modern prophecy is because of the 'lack of faith' of the receiver of the prophecy". At the same time another aspect of the doctrine is that there always remains the possibility that the person held to be speaking a rhema to that believer may be presumptuous and confusing doctrine with rhema. They concluded that this means that under this system modern prophecy was actually "'conditional'; and yet the person being prophesied over had to receive that 'conditional' word as if it were 'factual and true' as the 'engrafted Word of God.'... [this] "teaches that untested modern prophecy must be received as true, and in 'faith'. This is equivalent of having 'faith' in something unsubstantiated by the Bible; it is the equivalent of having blind faith in the blind faith put in 'established' prophets...[and] teaches all modern prophecy is conditional, even if those conditions aren't stated at the time of the prophecy! This makes God out to be a lying trickster who doesn't love us enough to tell us what He expects us to do." They hold rhema doctrine "redefines the 'rhema' word as a distinct category of (untested) modern prophecy, separate from the Logos written word. ...[and] commits the accursed sin of raising modern prophetic words to the level of the written word of God. ...[teaching] that untested modern prophecy must be received as 'the engrafted Word of God'. ...[this is] the sin of adding to the Word of God with untested modern revelations...it is changing God's contract with us. One cannot add to a contract or 'covenant' without changing it".

They concluded that this was teaching "that God was like a Magic Eight Ball in the Sky" where "we can pull down at will and on demand 'prophecies' that are 'false' but also 'true' at the same time." They also held that this placed too much emphasis on the actions and conditions of humans, robbing YHWH of His sovereignty. They were also troubled by the light consequences for prophesying falsely (which is worthy of death according to Deuteronomy 13:1-10). Saying that the idea "modern prophets are on a 'learning curve'" is unscriptural, and likened the idea to those chastised by Jesus in Revelation 2:20 for tolerating the prophetess Jezebel. They ask if failed or false prophecy is to be tolerated how will Christians be able to discern the coming of the end times when "many false prophets will appear" (Matthew 24:11) and the coming of the Second Beast who is described as "the false prophet that wrought miracles" (Revelation 19:20).
