= Kum-Kum =

Japanese anime television series

- わんぱく大昔クムクム
- Created by: Yoshikazu Yasuhiko
- Directed by: Rintaro
- Music by: Masahiro Uno
- Country of origin: Japan
- Original language: Japanese
- No. of episodes: 26

Production
- Producer: Tatsuo Shibayama
- Animator: Soeisha
- Production companies: Mainichi Broadcasting System; ITC Japan

Original release
- Network: JNN (MBS, TBS)
- Release: 3 October 1975 – 26 March 1976

Wanpaku Ōmukashi Kum Kum (わんぱく大昔クムクム, Wanpaku Ōmukashi Kumu Kumu; "Naughty Ancient Kumu Kumu") is a Japanese animated television series, consisting of 26 episodes. The series was created by Yoshikazu Yasuhiko and directed by Rintaro. It was first broadcast on TBS between October 3, 1975, and March 26, 1976. The name was changed to Kum Kum after the sixth episode in order to strengthen the image of "a child in the primitive era thriving in great nature" while also making it more approachable and familiar to viewers. The series received a recommendation from the Central Child Welfare Council due to its positive portrayal of themes such as friendship through the perspective of children.

Paramount Pictures produced an English dub of the series, which aired on ITV in the United Kingdom and Network 10 in Australia in between 1977 and 1978. It also aired in other countries like France, Germany, Argentina, Italy, Brazil, and Indonesia.

The series was adapted as a manga in December 1975, written and illustrated by Takemaru Nagata, and serialized in Kodansha's Terebi Magajin (TV Magazine) under the name "Kum Kum". A four-panel comic strip adaptation of the series also appeared periodically in Mainichi Shimbun in Osaka.

== Plot ==
The series explored the adventures of Kum Kum, a naughty boy in primeval times, and his friends as they grow up, often playing antics that surprise the occasional visitor to their village, and which almost always end up with Kum Kum being scolded by his stern father, Paru Paru.

== Characters ==
- Kum Kum (voiced by Kazue Tagami (Japanese); Ray Hartley (English)) is the main character, a naughty, yet kind boy.
- Chiru Chiru/Butterfly (voiced by Teruko Akiyama (Japanese); Barbara Frawley (English)) is Kum Kum's girlfriend, whose father is deceased.
- Aaron/Little Rock (voiced by Yoshiko Ota (Japanese); Keith Scott (English)) is one of Kum Kum's faithful friends.
- Goron/Jumbo (voiced by Toku Nishio (Japanese); Noel Judd (English)) is Aaron's huge, slow older brother.
- Mochi Mochi/Bumbles (voiced by Kōko Kikuchi (Japanese); Derani Scarr (English)) is Kum Kum's shy friend.
- Furu Furu/Wildflower (voiced by Yōko Asagami (Japanese); Barbara Frawley (English)) is Kum Kum's teenage sister.
- Paru Paru/Strongarm (voiced by Kōsei Tomita (Japanese); Noel Judd (English)), Kum Kum's grumpy father.
- Maru Maru/Flora (voiced by Mitsuko Tobome (Japanese); Beryl Marshall (English)) is Kum Kum's sweet mother
- Toru Toru/Tum Tum (voiced by Sachiko Chijimatsu (Japanese); Barbara Frawley (English)) is Kum Kum's baby brother.
- Klopedia/The Wise One (voiced by Ryūji Saikachi (Japanese); Keith Scott (English)) is the wise elder of the village, who lives surrounded by stone books.
- Roman (voiced by Ryūsei Nakao (Japanese); Keith Scott (English)) the son of Klopedia who eventually marries Furu Furu.
- Shama (voiced by Hisako Kyōda (Japanese); Derani Scarr (English)) is a female fortune teller. Adults have secret doubts about the accuracy of her predictions, while the children love to make fun of her.
- Saurus is a Brontosaurus-like dinosaur who lives in a pond near the village, and a friend of Kum Kum and his friends.

== Episodes ==
No.	Title	Animation directed by	Storyboarded by	Written by	Original release date
1	"Catching the Clouds" (オーイ集れ! ぼくらは原始っ子)	Norio Yazawa	Rintaro	Eiichi Tachi	3 October 1975
2	"The Ostrich Egg" (ダチョウになったパルパルプ)	Yoshikazu Yasuhiko	Yoshikazu Yasuhiko	Keisuke Fujikawa	10 October 1975
3	"The Seafolk" (南から来た少女メルシー)	Norio Yazawa	Noboru Ishiguro	Hideo Rokuka	17 October 1975
4	"The Rainbow Fish" (はねろ! 虹色の大魚)	Yoshikazu Yasuhiko	Yoshikazu Yasuhiko	Junji Tashiro	24 October 1975
5	"Roman Returns" (帰ってきた旅の子ローマン)	Norio Yazawa	Noboru Ishiguro	Hideo Rokuka	31 October 1975
6	"Ashes from the Sky" (ピョンキーのふしぎな贈り物)	TBA	Unknown	Unknown	7 November 1975
7	"The Rabbit" (ぼくらの村にお湯が出た)	TBA	Unknown	Unknown	14 November 1975
8	"The Sundial" (月にのぼったうさぎ)	TBA	Unknown	Unknown	21 November 1975
9	"The Necklace" (ゴロンがつくった首かざり)	Norio Yazawa	Norio Yazawa	Yoshiaki Yoshida	28 November 1975
10	"The Search for a Student" (クロペディアのあとつぎ探し)	Hiromitsu Morita	Ryōsuke Takahashi	Isao Okijima	5 December 1975
11	"Saurus the Coward" (おこれ! 恐竜サウルス)	Norio Yazawa	Mitsuo Kaminashi	Eiichi Tachi	12 December 1975
12	"Snow Fly" (冬の神をよぶ雪虫)	Yoshikazu Yasuhiko	Yoshikazu Yasuhiko	Yoshikazu Yasuhiko	19 December 1975
13	"Grotto the Wizard" (謎の魔法使いグロータ)	Hiromitsu Morita	Wataru Mizusawa	Yoshiaki Yoshida	26 December 1975
14	"Little Poppa" (ファイトだ! 小さなお父さん)	Norio Yazawa	Takeyuki Kanda	Masaaki Sakurai	2 January 1976
15	"The Elephant Tusk" (マンモスの牙の秘密)	Hiromitsu Morita	Noboru Ishiguro	Ariyoshi Katô	9 January 1976
16	"Goodbye Forever" (家へなんか帰らない)	Yoshikazu Yasuhiko	Yoshikazu Yasuhiko	Masuji Harada	16 January 1976
17	"Saurus Disappears" (サウルスが死んだ?)	Sadayoshi Tominaga	Wataru Mizusawa	Masuji Harada	23 January 1976
18	"The Killer Bear" (人喰いグマをたおせ!)	TBA	Ryōsuke Takahashi	Unknown	30 January 1976
19	"The Challenge" (出てこいローマン決闘だ!)	TBA	Unknown	Unknown	6 February 1976
20	"The Monster (Wild Man of the Mountains)" (出たあ! 山の怪物モンガー)	Futoshi Moriyama	Mitsuo Kaminashi	Masaaki Sakurai	13 February 1976
21	"The Cheeky Squeakeys Declare War" (ピョンキー・ポンキー大決戦)	Norio Yazawa	Yoshikazu Yasuhiko	Yoshikazu Yasuhiko	20 February 1976
22	"The Switch" (チルチルも父さんがほしい)	Hiromitsu Morita	Ryōsuke Takahashi	Hideo Rokuka	27 February 1976
23	"The Three Black Crows" (いたずらガラスをやっつけろ)	Futoshi Moriyama	Noboru Ishiguro	Masaaki Sakurai	5 March 1976
24	"Old Mother Dark Eyes" (シャーマの六つ子こもり歌)	Futoshi Moriyama	Susumu Ishizaki	Isao Okijima and Tadashi Akiyama	12 March 1976
25	"The Broken Heart" (ローマンを追いかけろ!)	Norio Yazawa	Noboru Ishiguro	Yoshikazu Yasuhiko	19 March 1976
26	"The Wedding" (フルフルはお嫁さんになった)	Hiromitsu Morita	Yoshikazu Yasuhiko	Yoshikazu Yasuhiko	26 March 1976

== Production ==
Kum Kum originated when Yoshikazu Yasuhiko, who had previously worked mostly on mecha anime series like Mobile Suit Gundam, expressed a desire to Tokuma Shoten (Soeisha) to "do something different". He was told to "make [the series himself]", which prompted him to devise the concept. This happened to catch the attention of the company Glico, leading to its adoption for their Peloty Chocolate brand and the anime being greenlit. Yasuhiko originally intended to direct it himself, but due to his lack of experience, Rintaro was brought on board instead. Additionally, the project and character designs were initially planned to be credited under Yasuhiko's pseudonym, "Madoka Akitsu" (秋津円, Akitsu Madoka), but ultimately ended up credited under his real name.

The character designs, settings, and story drafts underwent significant changes during the commercialisation process prior to the final version. Because of these changes to his vision, Yasuhiko lost his initial enthusiasm for the series by the time of its broadcast. However, after handling everything from the script to the storyboards and animation direction for episode 12, he was able to regain his affection for the project. The network and sponsors requested changes for episode 16, in which Kum Kum runs away from home. However, Rintaro resisted to keep the episode's grounded realism.

The first episode begins with a scene where Kum Kum is forgiven by his parents and let out of the "punishment hole" (an alternative to the real-world punishment of being locked in a closet or storage room). Producer Tatsuo Shibayama stated that the final episode ends with Kum Kum being put into the "punishment hole", based on the idea of the series starting and ending with said hole.

== Music ==
The theme song record was released by Nippon Columbia. The insert songs first appeared on a compilation LP named Latest TV Manga Idol Deluxe (最新テレビまんが 人気者（アイドル）デラックス, Saishin TV Manga Idol Deluxe), released in March 1976. This album included four songs each from different anime series, including The Adventures of Pepero, Laura, the Prairie Girl, and Arabian Nights: Sinbad's Adventures, for a total of 16 tracks.

Opening Theme

- "Kum Kum's Song (恋してはじめて知った君, Kum Kum no Uta)"
  Lyrics by Hajime Kijima
  Composition and arrangement by Koichi Sugiyama & Arai Yasunori
  Performed by Mitsuko Horie & Columbia Yurikago Kai

Ending Theme

- "Little Saurus (サウルスくん, Saurusu-kun)"
  Lyrics by Hajime Kijima
  Composition and arrangement by Koichi Sugiyama & Arai Yasunori
  Performed by Mitsuko Horie, Tatsuya Kishi & Columbia Yurikago Kai

Image Songs

- "Let's Play (あそぼう, Asobou)"
  Lyrics by Katsumi Tanuma
  Composition and arrangement by Koichi Sugiyama & Reijirō Koroku
  Performed by Mitsuko Horie
- "Naughty Kum Kum (わんぱくクムクム, Wanpaku Kumu Kumu)"
  Lyrics by Katsumi Tanuma
  Composition and arrangement by Koichi Sugiyama & Reijirō Koroku
  Performed by Columbia Yurikago Kai & Koorogi '73

== In popular culture ==
Argentine football player Sergio Agüero's nickname, "Kun", comes from the name of the show.
