= Yoshikazu Yasuhiko =

Japanese manga artist and animator

- 安彦 良和
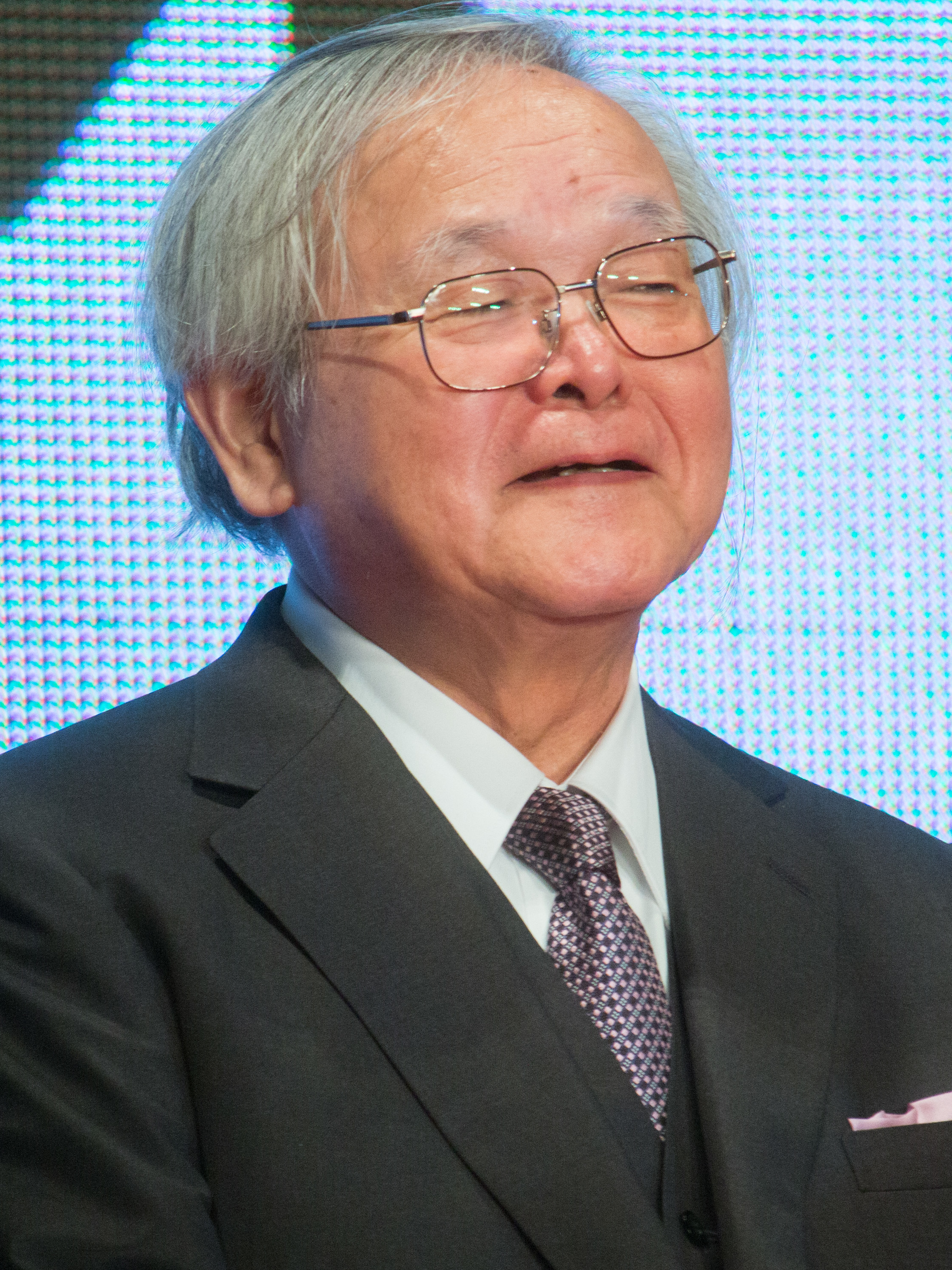
- Yasuhiko at the 28th Tokyo International Film Festival, 2015
- Born: December 9, 1947 (age 78); Engaru, Hokkaidō, Japan
- Occupations: Animator, manga artist, director
- Years active: 1970–present
- Known for: Mobile Suit Gundam; Mobile Suit Gundam: The Origin
- Awards: Seiun Award (1981, 2012); Japan Academy Film Prize (2021)

Yoshikazu Yasuhiko (Japanese: 安彦 良和, Hepburn: Yasuhiko Yoshikazu; born December 9, 1947) is a Japanese animator, manga artist, and anime director. He is best known for being the character designer and animation director of the original Mobile Suit Gundam anime, which began in 1979. That same year, he began working as a manga artist, which had been his dream since childhood. His manga have been critically acclaimed and have won numerous awards.

== Early life ==
Born in 1947 in Engaru, Hokkaidō, Yasuhiko started to draw manga in third grade of elementary school. In high school, he learned the basics of Marxism from a teacher and was inspired by it.

At the time, the world's focus was on the Vietnam War, a proxy war between the capitalist United States and socialist Soviet Union. Yasuhiko said seeing a superpower such as the US burn down a small country naturally made him "anti-American". Additionally, he viewed Japan as complicit in the war by supporting the USA through Yokota Air Base and Misawa Air Base, while claiming to have a pacifist constitution, something he called unforgivable. He began attending Hirosaki University in 1966.

A member of the New Left, he became a leader in the Zenkyōtō student movement and involved in the anti-war protests. In September 1969, Yasuhiko was arrested on suspicion of breaking and entering into Hirosaki University, and subsequently expelled.

== Career ==
After moving to Tokyo at age 22, Yasuhiko joined Mushi Productions' training school and began working as an animator despite dreaming of becoming a manga artist. He has since admitted that he had no interest in animation and did not know what the job would entail, he simply applied to the newspaper advertisement on a whim in order to make a living. It was not until he storyboarded Space Battleship Yamato (1974) that he began to find the job interesting.

Yasuhiko later went freelance and worked on various anime productions for film and television. Some of his most notable works as character designer and director are Brave Reideen, Combattler V, Mobile Suit Gundam, and Giant Gorg. Less well-known is the fact that he was the original character designer for Dirty Pair, when he illustrated the Haruka Takachiho short stories that became the 1980 fixup novel The Great Adventures of the Dirty Pair.

Yasuhiko said he had given up on manga because he was under the impression that manga artists had to use pens and he was personally unable to draw sufficiently with one. But while working on Space Battleship Yamato, he visited Leiji Matsumoto who told him that manga artists could also use brushes. Yasuhiko made his manga debut with Arion (1979–1984). In 1981, he won the Seiun Award in the art category. Yasuhiko turned Arion into an animated film that he directed and co-wrote in 1986. That same year, he began the manga Venus Wars (1986–1990), which he also later adapted into a film.

Yasuhiko became a full-time manga artist in 1989. He serialized Namuji from 1989 to 1991. It won an Excellence Award at the 1992 Japan Cartoonists Association Awards. In the mid-1990s, he created works such as Joan, a three-volume story of a young French girl living at the time of the Hundred Years' War, whose life parallels that of Joan of Arc; and Jesus, a two-volume biographical manga about the life of Jesus Christ. Yasuhiko created Ōdō no Inu from 1998 to 2000. In 2000, it earned him an Excellence Prize at the Japan Media Arts Festival.

Yasuhiko serialized Mobile Suit Gundam: The Origin for ten years, from 2001 to 2011. He stated that, in his mind, "Gundam" is only the original 1979 anime series and that it is the only one that he takes responsibility for. The artist also said that subsequent installments in the franchise focused more on the "Newtypes" seen in the series, which lead to critics and otaku misunderstanding the theme of Gundam. Yasuhiko further stated that the perpetrators of the Tokyo subway sarin attack in 1995 were "undoubtedly familiar" with Gundam and the "Newtypes". As such, "I had to do another job to correct the distortions in understanding 'Gundam'--, which was why I ended up drawing 'The Origin' in response to Sunrise's request." The manga has over 10 million copies in circulation, and earned him the 2012 Seiun Award in the comics category. He returned to animation in the 2010s to direct Mobile Suit Gundam: The Origin's anime adaptations.

He created Ten no Ketsumyaku, about a student in Manchuria on the eve of the Russo-Japanese War, for Monthly Afternoon between January 2012 and September 2016. In 2015, he won a special award for lifetime achievement at the Animation Kobe Awards.

Yasuhiko began Inui to Tatsumi -Siberia Shuppei Hishi- in Monthly Afternoon on September 25, 2018. The historical series set during the Siberian Intervention was announced as being his last serialized manga.

Yasuhiko was honored with a special award for lifetime achievement at the 44th Japan Academy Film Prize in 2021. He also received a lifetime achievement award at the 2022 film awards held by the Agency for Cultural Affairs.

Yasuhiko stated that the 2022 film Mobile Suit Gundam: Cucuruz Doan's Island, which he directed, would be his last work in animation. Yasuhiko began the short-term manga series Giniro no Michi-Handa-yama Ibun in Weekly Young Jump on March 6, 2025. Published in the magazine once every two weeks, the story follows Godai Tomoatsu and how he facilitated the recovery of the Handa Silver Mine.

== Style ==
As a child, Yasuhiko was particularly fond of Mitsuteru Yokoyama's art. His own manga are known for their action scenes. Yasuhiko does not create memos, sketches or names in advance, he draws directly onto manuscript BB Kent paper in pencil. Unusually, after deciding the page's panel layout, he begins by drawing characters' faces. He inks every part of his manga with a Sakuyo brush, except the panels, which are done first with a fineliner pen. He goes through two or three brushes for a 30-page chapter. Yasuhiko said he does not know how to use white ink, so he inks around negative space that he leaves in.

Michael Toole of Anime News Network wrote that by defining the look of Gundam's characters, Yasuhiko also defined the look of science fiction anime characters in the 1980s in general by extension. Yasuhiko signs his artwork as "YAS".

== Filmography ==
=== Television ===
- Wandering Sun (1971) (character design)
- Zero Tester (1973) (animator)
- Space Battleship Yamato (1974) (storyboards)
- Brave Raideen (1975) (character design, animation director)
- Wanpaku Omukashi Kum Kum (1975) (screenplay, original creator, character design, animation director)
- Combattler V (1976) (character design)
- Robokko Beeton (1976) (character design, animation director)
- Zambot 3 (1977) (character design)
- The Adventures of the Little Prince (1978) (character design)
- Mobile Suit Gundam (1979) (character design, chief animation director, key animation)
- Shiroi Kiba White Fang Monogatari (1982) (character design, animation director)
- Giant Gorg (1984) (chief director, storyboard (eps. 1, 4), original creator, character design, animation director)
- Mobile Suit Zeta Gundam (1985) (character design)
- Super Atragon (1995) (character design)
- Strange+ (2014) (end credit illustration for ep. 8)

=== OVA ===
- Kaze to Ki no Uta Sanctus: Sei Naru ka na (1987) (director, storyboard)
- Crusher Joe OVA (1989) (character design)
- Mobile Suit Gundam Unicorn (2009) (original character design, illustrations for the original light novel)
- Mobile Suit Gundam: The Origin (2015) (chief director, storyboard eps. 1–4, original manga, character design)

=== Film ===
- Crusher Joe the Movie (1983) (director, script, screenplay, storyboard, character design, animation director)
- Arion (1986) (director, character design)
- Venus Wars (1989) (original story, director, character design)
- Mobile Suit Gundam F91 (1991) (character design)
- Mobile Suit Gundam: Cucuruz Doan's Island (2022) (director)

== Manga ==
- Arion (1979–1984)
- Kurd no Hoshi (1985–1987)
- Venus Wars (1986–1990)
- C Kouto (1987–1988)
- Namuji (1989–1991)
- Nijiiro no Trotsky (1990–1996)
- Zinmu (1992–1995)
- Anton (1992–1995)
- Joan (1995–1996, spelled Jeanne in Japanese)
- Jesus (1997)
- Maraya (1998)
- Waga na wa Nero (1998–1999)
- Ōdō no Inu (1998–2000)
- Dattan Typhoon (2000–2002)
- Nomi no Ō (2001)
- Mobile Suit Gundam: The Origin (2001–2011)
- Alexandros Sekai Teikoku e no Yume (2003)
- Uruwashijima Yume Monogatari (2006–2012)
- Ten no Ketsumyaku (2012–2016)
- Inui to Tatsumi -Siberia Shuppei Hishi- (2018–2024)
- Giniro no Michi -Handa-yama Ibun- (2025–present)

== Other work ==
- "Sora no Uta ~Higher and Higher~/Hisōbi" (2019) – single from the band Luna Sea – two cover illustrations for the limited edition release
- "The Beyond" (2020) – single from the band Luna Sea – cover illustration
