= Ōdō no Inu =

Japanese manga series

- First tankōbon volume cover

王道の狗
- Genre: Drama, Historical
- Manga
- Written by: Yukinobu Hoshino
- Published by: Kodansha (1998–2000); Hakusensha (2004-2014 print)
- Imprint: Mister Magazine KCDX
- Magazine: Mr. Magazine
- Original run: January 14, 1998 – February 9, 2000
- Volumes: 6

Ōdō no Inu (Japanese: 王道の狗; 'Revolutionary Dog') is a Japanese manga series written and illustrated by Yoshikazu Yasuhiko. It was serialized in Kodansha's seinen manga magazine Mr. Magazine from January 1998 to February 2000, with its chapters collected in six tankōbon volumes.

Ōdō no Inu won the Excellence Prize for manga at the fourth Japan Media Arts Festival in 2000.

== Publication ==
Written and illustrated by Yoshikazu Yasuhiko, Ōdō no Inu was serialized in Kodansha's seinen manga magazine Mr. Magazine from January 14, 1998, to February 9, 2000. Kodansha collected its chapters in six tankōbon volumes, published from June 6, 1998, to March 7, 2000.

The final part of the story was rushed due to the suspension of publication of the magazine in which it was published in January 2000, and a complete edition published by Hakusensha between November 2004 and February 2005 contained major revisions, including new chapters 31 and 47. Hakusensha republished the series in four bunkoban volumes between September and December 2014.

=== Volumes ===
No.	Release date	ISBN
1	June 6, 1998	978-4-06-319941-3
2	October 7, 1998	978-4-06-333988-8
3	March 6, 1999	978-4-06-334042-6
4	August 4, 1999	978-4-06-334211-6
5	December 4, 1999	978-4-06-334262-8
6	March 7, 2000	978-4-06-334287-1

== Reception ==
Along with Massuguni-ikō, Paji and Tasogare Ryūseigun, Ōdō no Inu won the Excellence Prize for manga at the fourth Japan Media Arts Festival in 2000.
