= Logos =

Concept in philosophy, religion, rhetoric, and psychology

Greek spelling of logos

Logos (UK: /ˈloʊɡɒs, ˈlɒɡɒs/, US: /ˈloʊɡoʊs/; Ancient Greek: λόγος, romanized: lógos, lit. 'word, discourse, or reason') is a term used in Western philosophy, psychology and rhetoric, as well as religion (notably Christianity), that most broadly means reason, logic, order, or understanding. Among its connotations is that of a rational form of discourse that relies on inductive and deductive reasoning.

Aristotle first systematized the usage of the word, making it one of the three principles of rhetoric alongside ethos and pathos. This original use identifies the word closely to the structure and content of language or text. Both Plato and Aristotle used the term logos (along with rhema) to refer to sentences and propositions.

== Background ==
Ancient Greek: λόγος, romanized: lógos, lit. 'word, discourse, or reason' is related to Ancient Greek: λέγω, romanized: légō, lit. 'I say' which is cognate with Latin: lex, lit. 'law'. The word derives from a Proto-Indo-European root, *leǵ-, which can have the meanings "I put in order, arrange, gather, choose, count, reckon, discern, say, speak". In modern usage, it typically connotes the verbs "account", "measure", "reason" or "discourse". It is occasionally used in other contexts, such as for "ratio" in mathematics.

== Origins of the term ==
Logos became a technical term in Western philosophy beginning with Heraclitus (c. 535 – c. 475 BC), who used the term for a principle of order and knowledge. Ancient Greek philosophers used the term in different ways. The sophists used the term to mean "discourse". Aristotle applied the term to refer to "reasoned discourse" or "the argument" in the field of rhetoric, and considered it one of the three modes of persuasion alongside ethos and pathos. Pyrrhonist philosophers used the term to refer to dogmatic accounts of non-evident matters. The Stoics spoke of the logos spermatikos (the generative principle of the Universe) which foreshadows related concepts in Neoplatonism.

Within Hellenistic Judaism, Philo (c. 20 BC – c. 50 AD) integrated the term into Jewish philosophy. Philo distinguished between logos prophorikos ("the utterer word or speaker"), logos spermatikos ("the speech") and the logos endiathetos ("the word remaining within").

The Gospel of John identifies the Christian Logos, through which all things are made, as divine (theos), and further identifies Jesus Christ as the incarnate Logos. Early translators of the Greek New Testament, such as Jerome (in the 4th century AD), experienced frustration with the inadequacy of any single Latin word to convey the meaning of the word logos as used to describe Jesus Christ in the Gospel of John. The Vulgate Bible usage of in principio erat verbum was thus constrained to use the (perhaps inadequate) noun verbum for "word"; later Romance language translations had the advantage of nouns such as le Verbe in French. Reformation translators took another approach. Martin Luther rejected Zeitwort (verb) in favor of Wort (word), for instance, although later commentators repeatedly turned to a more dynamic use involving the living word as used by Jerome and Augustine. The term is also used in Sufism, and the analytical psychology of Carl Jung.

Despite the conventional translation as "word", logos is not used for a word in the grammatical sense—for that, the term lexis (λέξις, léxis) was used. However, both logos and lexis derive from the same verb légō (λέγω), meaning "(I) count, tell, say, speak".

In the ancient Greek context, the term logos in the sense of "word" or "discourse" also contrasted with mythos (Ancient Greek: μῦθος). Classical Greek usage sees reasoned argument (logos) as distinct from imaginative tales (mythos).

== Ancient Greek philosophy ==
The writing of Heraclitus (c. 535 – c. 475 BC) was the first place where the word logos was given special attention in ancient Greek philosophy, although Heraclitus seems to use the word with a meaning not significantly different from the way in which it was used in ordinary Greek of his time. For Heraclitus, logos provided the link between rational discourse and the world's rational structure.

This logos holds always but humans always prove unable to ever understand it, both before hearing it and when they have first heard it. For though all things come to be in accordance with this logos, humans are like the inexperienced when they experience such words and deeds as I set out, distinguishing each in accordance with its nature and saying how it is. But other people fail to notice what they do when awake, just as they forget what they do while asleep.

— Diels–Kranz, 22B1

For this reason it is necessary to follow what is common. But although the logos is common, most people live as if they had their own private understanding.

— Diels–Kranz, 22B2

Listening not to me but to the logos it is wise to agree that all things are one.

— Diels–Kranz, 22B50

What logos means here is not certain; it may mean "reason" or "explanation" in the sense of an objective cosmic law, or it may signify nothing more than "saying" or "wisdom". Yet, an independent existence of a universal logos was clearly suggested by Heraclitus.

Aristotle, 384–322 BC

Following one of the other meanings of the word, Aristotle gave logos a different technical definition in the Rhetoric, using it as meaning argument from reason, one of the three modes of persuasion. The other two modes are pathos (πᾰ́θος, páthos), which refers to persuasion by means of emotional appeal, "putting the hearer into a certain frame of mind"; and ethos (ἦθος, êthos), persuasion through convincing listeners of one's "moral character". According to Aristotle, logos relates to "the speech itself, in so far as it proves or seems to prove". In the words of Paul Rahe:

For Aristotle, logos is something more refined than the capacity to make private feelings public: it enables the human being to perform as no other animal can; it makes it possible for him to perceive and make clear to others through reasoned discourse the difference between what is advantageous and what is harmful, between what is just and what is unjust, and between what is good and what is evil.

Logos, pathos, and ethos can all be appropriate at different times. Arguments from reason (logical arguments) have some advantages, namely that data are (ostensibly) difficult to manipulate, so it is harder to argue against such an argument. On the other hand, trust in the speaker—built through ethos—enhances the appeal of arguments from reason.

Robert Wardy suggests that what Aristotle rejects in supporting the use of logos "is not emotional appeal per se, but rather emotional appeals that have no 'bearing on the issue', in that the pathē [πᾰ́θη, páthē] they stimulate lack, or at any rate are not shown to possess, any intrinsic connection with the point at issue—as if an advocate were to try to whip an antisemitic audience into a fury because the accused is Jewish; or as if another in drumming up support for a politician were to exploit his listeners's reverential feelings for the politician's ancestors".

Aristotle comments on the three modes by stating:

Of the modes of persuasion furnished by the spoken word there are three kinds.
The first kind depends on the personal character of the speaker;
the second on putting the audience into a certain frame of mind;
the third on the proof, or apparent proof, provided by the words of the speech itself.

— Aristotle, Rhetoric, 350 BC

Stoic philosophy began with Zeno of Citium c. 300 BC, in which the logos was the active reason pervading and animating the Universe. It was conceived as material and is usually identified with God or Nature. The Stoics also referred to the seminal logos ("logos spermatikos"), or the law of generation in the Universe, which was the principle of the active reason working in inanimate matter. Humans, too, each possess a portion of the divine logos.

The Stoics took all activity to imply a logos or spiritual principle. As the operative principle of the world, the logos was anima mundi to them, a concept which later influenced Philo of Alexandria, although he derived the contents of the term from Plato. In his Introduction to the 1964 edition of Marcus Aurelius' Meditations, the Anglican priest Maxwell Staniforth wrote that "Logos ... had long been one of the leading terms of Stoicism, chosen originally for the purpose of explaining how deity came into relation with the universe".

Public discourse on ancient Greek rhetoric has historically emphasized Aristotle's appeals to logos, pathos, and ethos, while less attention has been directed to Isocrates' teachings about philosophy and logos, and their partnership in generating an ethical, mindful polis. Isocrates does not provide a single definition of logos in his work, but Isocratean logos characteristically focuses on speech, reason, and civic discourse. He was concerned with establishing the "common good" of Athenian citizens, which he believed could be achieved through the pursuit of philosophy and the application of logos.

== Neoplatonism ==
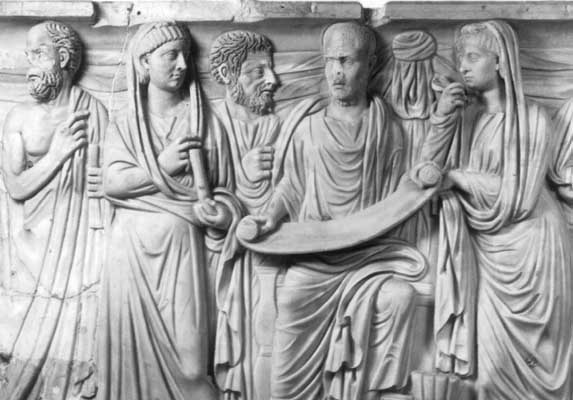
Plotinus with his disciples

Neoplatonist philosophers such as Plotinus (c. 204/5 – 270 AD) used logos in ways that drew on Plato and the Stoics, but the term logos was interpreted in different ways throughout Neoplatonism, and similarities to Philo's concept of logos appear to be accidental. The logos was a key element in the meditations of Plotinus regarded as the first neoplatonist. Plotinus referred back to Heraclitus and as far back as Thales in interpreting logos as the principle of meditation, existing as the interrelationship between the hypostases—the soul, the intellect (nous), and the One.

Plotinus used a trinity concept that consisted of "The One", the "Spirit", and "Soul". The comparison with the Christian Trinity is inescapable, but for Plotinus these were not equal and "The One" was at the highest level, with the "Soul" at the lowest. For Plotinus, the relationship between the three elements of his trinity is conducted by the outpouring of logos from the higher principle, and eros (loving) upward from the lower principle. Plotinus relied heavily on the concept of logos, but no explicit references to Christian thought can be found in his works, although there are significant traces of them in his doctrine. Plotinus specifically avoided using the term logos to refer to the second person of his trinity. However, Plotinus influenced Gaius Marius Victorinus, who then influenced Augustine of Hippo. Centuries later, Carl Jung acknowledged the influence of Plotinus in his use of the term.

Victorinus differentiated between the logos interior to God and the logos related to the world by creation and salvation.

Augustine of Hippo, often seen as the father of medieval philosophy, was also greatly influenced by Plato and is famous for his re-interpretation of Aristotle and Plato in the light of early Christian thought. A young Augustine experimented with, but failed to achieve ecstasy using the meditations of Plotinus. In his Confessions, Augustine described logos as the Divine Eternal Word, by which he, in part, was able to motivate the early Christian thought throughout the Hellenized world (of which the Latin speaking West was a part) Augustine's logos had taken body in Christ, the man in whom the logos (i.e. veritas or sapientia) was present as in no other man.

== Influence in religion ==
=== Hellenistic Judaism ===
==== Philo of Alexandria ====
Philo (c. 20 BC – c. 50 AD), a Hellenized Jew, used the term logos to mean an intermediary divine being or demiurge. Philo followed the Platonic distinction between imperfect matter and perfect Form, and therefore intermediary beings were necessary to bridge the enormous gap between God and the material world. The logos was the highest of these intermediary beings, and was called by Philo "the first-born of God". Philo also wrote that "the Logos of the living God is the bond of everything, holding all things together and binding all the parts, and prevents them from being dissolved and separated".

Plato's Theory of Forms was located within the logos, but the logos also acted on behalf of God in the physical world. In particular, the Angel of the Lord in the Hebrew Bible (Old Testament) was identified with the logos by Philo, who also said that the logos was God's instrument in the creation of the Universe.

==== Targums ====
The concept of logos also appears in the Targums (Aramaic translations of the Hebrew Bible dating to the first centuries AD), where the term memra (Aramaic for "word") is often used instead of 'the Lord', especially when referring to a manifestation of God that could be construed as anthropomorphic.

=== Christianity ===
In Christology, the Logos (Koine Greek: Λόγος, lit. 'word, discourse, or reason') is a name or title of Jesus Christ, seen as the preeminent expression in fulness of all the attributes, the complete thought, and the entire "knowable" reality of the infinite and spiritually transcendent Godhead. This concept is applied to John 1:1 in the Douay–Rheims (1582), King James (1604), as well as the New International and other versions of the Bible, where "logos" is capitalized in translation as "Word"; thereby rendering the verse as:

In the beginning was the Word, and the Word was with God, and the Word was God.

=== Gnosticism ===
According to the Gnostic scriptures recorded in the Holy Book of the Great Invisible Spirit, the Logos is an emanation of the great spirit that is merged with the spiritual Adam called Adamas.

=== Islam ===
The concept of the logos also exists in Islam, where it was definitively articulated primarily in the writings of the classical Sunni mystics and Islamic philosophers, as well as by certain Shi'a thinkers, during the Islamic Golden Age. In Sunni Islam, the concept of the logos has been given many different names by the denomination's metaphysicians, mystics, and philosophers, including ʿaql ("Intellect"), al-insān al-kāmil ("Universal Man"), kalimat Allāh ("Word of God"), haqīqa muḥammadiyya ("The Muhammadan Reality"), and nūr muḥammadī ("The Muhammadan Light").

==== ʿAql ====
One of the names given to a concept very much like the Christian Logos by the classical Muslim metaphysicians is ʿaql, which is the "Arabic equivalent to the Greek νοῦς (intellect)." In the writings of the Islamic neoplatonist philosophers, such as al-Farabi (c. 872 – c. 950 AD) and Avicenna (d. 1037), the idea of the ʿaql was presented in a manner that both resembled "the late Greek doctrine" and, likewise, "corresponded in many respects to the Logos Christology."

The concept of logos in Sufism is used to relate the "Uncreated" (God) to the "Created" (humanity). In Sufism, for the Deist, no contact between man and God can be possible without the logos. The logos is everywhere and always the same, but its personification is "unique" within each epoch. Jesus and Muhammad are seen as the personifications of the logos, and this is what enables them to speak in such absolute terms.

One of the boldest and most radical attempts to reformulate the neoplatonic concepts into Sufism arose with the philosopher Ibn Arabi, who traveled widely in Spain and North Africa. His concepts were expressed in two major works The Ringstones of Wisdom (Fusus al-Hikam) and The Meccan Illuminations (Al-Futūḥāt al-Makkiyya). To Ibn Arabi, every prophet corresponds to a reality which he called a logos (Kalimah), as an aspect of the unique divine being. In his view the divine being would have for ever remained hidden, had it not been for the prophets, with logos providing the link between man and divinity.

Ibn Arabi seems to have adopted his version of the logos concept from neoplatonic and Christian sources, although (writing in Arabic rather than Greek) he used more than twenty different terms when discussing it. For Ibn Arabi, the logos or "Universal Man" was a mediating link between individual human beings and the divine essence.

Other Sufi writers also show the influence of the neoplatonic logos. In the 15th century Abd al-Karīm al-Jīlī introduced the Doctrine of Logos and the Perfect Man. For al-Jīlī, the "perfect man" (associated with the logos or the Prophet) has the power to assume different forms at different times and to appear in different guises.

In Ottoman Sufism, Şeyh Gâlib (d. 1799) articulates Sühan (logos-Kalima) in his Hüsn ü Aşk (Beauty and Love) in parallel to Ibn Arabi's Kalima. In the romance, Sühan appears as an embodiment of Kalima as a reference to the Word of God, the Perfect Man, and the Reality of Muhammad.

== Jung's analytical psychology ==
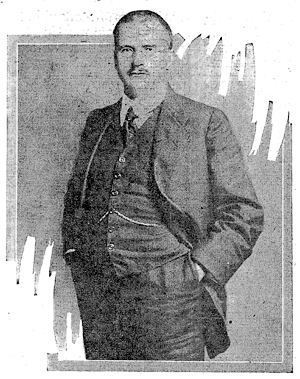
A 37-year-old Carl Jung in 1912

Carl Jung contrasted the critical and rational faculties of logos with emotional, non-reason oriented and mythical elements. In Jung's approach, logos vs eros can be represented as "science vs mysticism", or "reason vs imagination" or "conscious activity vs the unconscious".

For Jung, logos represented the masculine principle of rationality, in contrast to its feminine counterpart, eros:

Woman’s psychology is founded on the principle of Eros, the great binder and loosener, whereas from ancient times the ruling principle ascribed to man is Logos. The concept of Eros could be expressed in modern terms as psychic relatedness, and that of Logos as objective interest.

== Rhetoric ==
Author and professor Jeanne Fahnestock describes logos as a "premise". She states that, to find the reason behind a rhetor's backing of a certain position or stance, one must acknowledge the different "premises" that the rhetor applies via their chosen diction. The rhetor's success, she argues, will come down to "certain objects of agreement...between arguer and audience".

== Rhema ==
The word logos has been used in different senses along with rhema. Both Plato and Aristotle used the term logos along with rhema to refer to sentences and propositions.

The Septuagint translation of the Hebrew Bible into Greek uses the terms rhema and logos as equivalents and uses both for the Hebrew word dabar, as the Word of God.

Some modern usage in Christian theology distinguishes rhema from logos (which here refers to the written scriptures) while rhema refers to the revelation received by the reader from the Holy Spirit when the Word (logos) is read, although this distinction has been criticized.

== See also ==
- Asha
- -logy
- Dharma
- Imiaslavie
- Logocracy
- Logotherapy
- Om
- Parmenides
- Ṛta
- Shabda
- Sophia (wisdom)
- Tao
- Teotl
