= Ethos =

Greek word meaning 'character'

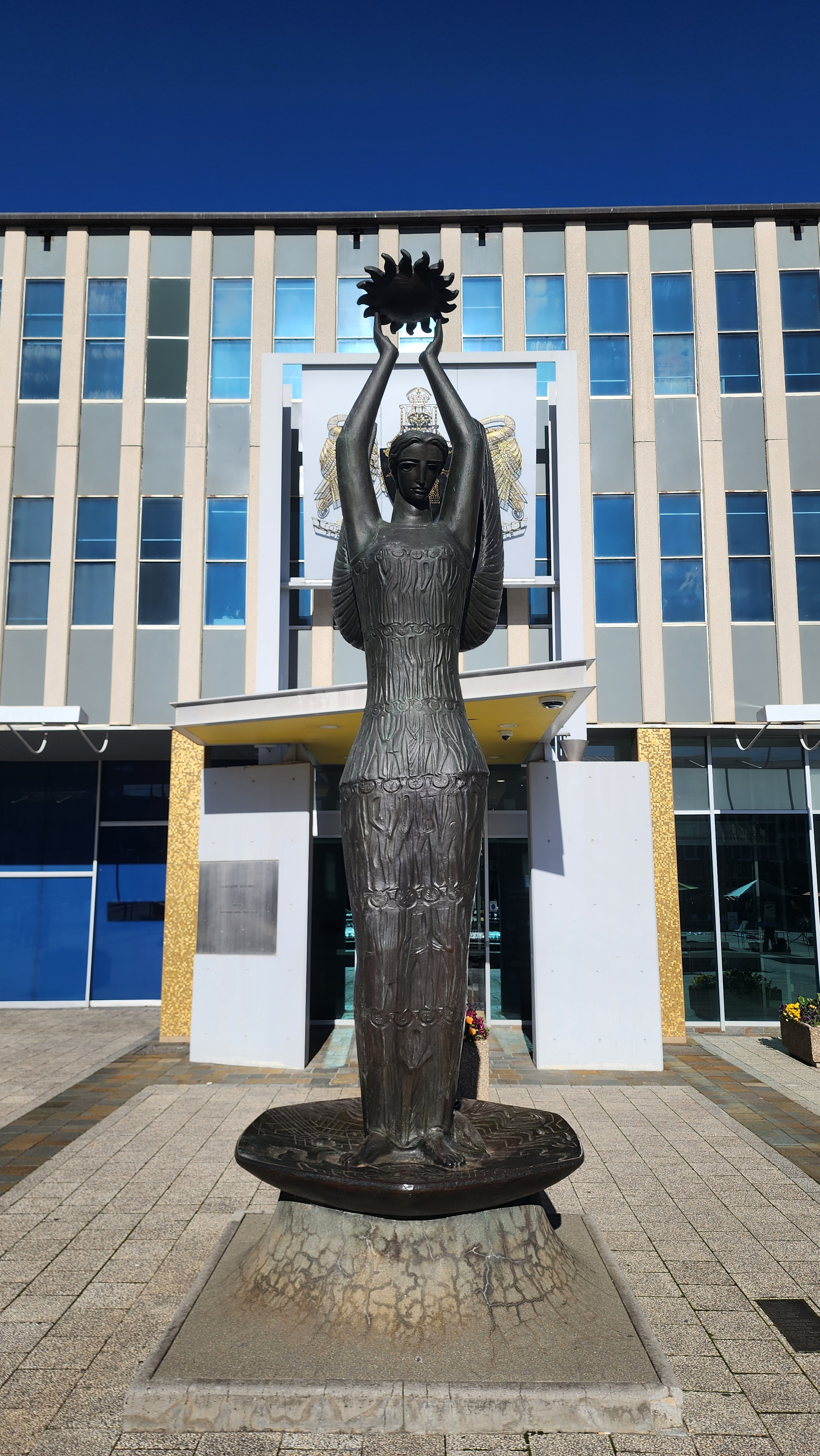
A sculpture representing Ethos outside the Australian Capital Territory Legislative Assembly in Canberra, Australia

Ethos (Note: UK: /ˈiːθɒs/ EE-thos or US: /ˈiːθoʊs/ EE-thohs; pl. ethea, ethe or ethoses) (Note: Ancient Greek: ήθος, romanized: ḗthos, lit. 'character; custom or habit') is a Greek word meaning "custom" that is used to describe the guiding beliefs or ideals that characterize a community, nation, or ideology; and the balance between caution and passion. The Greeks also used this word to refer to the power of music to influence emotions, behaviors, and even morals. Early Greek stories of Orpheus exhibit this idea in a compelling way. The word's use in rhetoric is closely based on the Greek terminology used by Aristotle in his concept of the three artistic proofs or modes of persuasion alongside pathos and logos. It gives credit to the speaker, or the speaker is taking credit.

== Etymology and origin ==
Ethos (ἦθος, ἔθος; plurals: ethe, ἤθη; ethea, ἤθεα) is a Greek word originally meaning "accustomed place" (as in ἤθεα ἵππων "the habitats of horses/", Iliad 6.511, 15.268), "custom, habit", equivalent to Latin mores. Ethos forms the root of ethikos (ἠθικός), meaning "morality, showing moral character". As an adjective in the neuter plural form ta ethika.

== Current usage ==
In modern usage, ethos denotes the disposition, character, or fundamental values peculiar to a specific person, people, organization, culture, or movement. For example, the poet and critic T. S. Eliot wrote in 1940 that "the general ethos of the people they have to govern determines the behavior of politicians". Similarly the historian Orlando Figes wrote in 1996 that in Soviet Russia of the 1920s "the ethos of the Communist party dominated every aspect of public life".

Ethos may change in response to new ideas or forces. For example, according to the Jewish historian Arie Krampf, ideas of economic modernization which were imported into Palestine in the 1930s brought about "the abandonment of the agrarian ethos and the reception of...the ethos of rapid development".

== Rhetoric ==
In classical Western rhetorical theory, ethos is a means of persuasion based on the audience's judgment of the rhetor. Classical Greek rhetoricians disagree on how ethos was constructed.

Isocrates contends that a speaker's ethos extends to and is shaped by the overall moral character and history of the speaker—that is, what people think of his or her character before the speech has even begun.

For Aristotle, ethos is one of the three artistic proofs (pistis, πίστις) or modes of persuasion (other principles being logos and pathos). Speakers must establish ethos from the start. Aristotle broadens the concept from "moral competence" to include expertise and knowledge. Ethos is limited, in his view, by what the speaker says.

According to Aristotle, there are three categories of ethos:

- phronesis – useful skills and practical wisdom
- arete – virtue, goodwill
- eunoia – goodwill towards the audience

In a sense, ethos does not belong to the speaker but to the audience and it's appealing to the audience's emotions. Thus, it is the audience that determines whether a speaker is a high- or a low-ethos speaker. Violations of ethos include:

- The speaker has a direct interest in the outcome of the debate (e.g. a person pleading innocence of a crime);
- The speaker has a vested interest or ulterior motive in the outcome of the debate;
- The speaker has no expertise (e.g. a lawyer giving a speech on space flight is less convincing than an astronaut giving the same speech).

Completely dismissing an argument based on any of the above violations of ethos is an informal fallacy (Appeal to motive). The argument may indeed be suspect; but is not, in itself, invalid.

=== Modern interpretations ===
Although Plato never uses the term "ethos" in his extant corpus; scholar Collin Bjork, a communicator, podcaster, and digital rhetorician, argues that Plato dramatizes the complexity of rhetorical ethos in the Apology of Socrates. For Aristotle, a speaker's ethos was a rhetorical strategy employed by an orator whose purpose was to "inspire trust in his audience" (Rhetorica 1380). Ethos was therefore achieved through the orator's "good sense, good moral character, and goodwill", and central to Aristotelian virtue ethics was the notion that this "good moral character" was increased in virtuous degree by habit (Rhetorica 1380). Ethos also is related to a character's habit as well (The Essential Guide to Rhetoric, 2018). The person's character is related to a person's habits (The Essential Guide to Rhetoric, 2018). Aristotle links virtue, habituation, and ethos most succinctly in Book II of Nicomachean Ethics: "Virtue, then, being of two kinds, intellectual and moral, intellectual virtue in the main owes both its birth and its growth to teaching [...] while moral virtue comes about as a result of habit, whence also its name ethike is one that is formed by a slight variation from the word ethos (habit)" (952). Discussing women and rhetoric, scholar Karlyn Kohrs Campbell notes that entering the public sphere was considered an act of moral transgression for females of the nineteenth century: "Women who formed moral reform and abolitionist societies, and who made speeches, held conventions, and published newspapers, entered the public sphere and thereby lost their claims to purity and piety" (13). Crafting an ethos within such restrictive moral codes, therefore, meant adhering to membership of what Nancy Fraser and Michael Warner have theorized as counter publics. While Warner contends that members of counter publics are afforded little opportunity to join the dominant public and therefore exert true agency, Nancy Fraser has problematized Habermas's conception of the public sphere as a dominant "social totality" by theorizing "subaltern counter publics", which function as alternative publics that represent "parallel discursive arenas where members of subordinated social groups invent and circulate counterdiscourses, which in turn permit them to formulate oppositional interpretations of their identities, interests, and needs" (67).

Though feminist rhetorical theorists have begun to offer ways of conceiving of ethos that are influenced by postmodern concepts of identity, they remain cognizant of how these classical associations have shaped and still do shape women's use of the rhetorical tool. Johanna Schmertz draws on Aristotelian ethos to reinterpret the term alongside feminist theories of subjectivity, writing that, "Instead of following a tradition that, it seems to me, reads ethos somewhat in the manner of an Aristotelian quality proper to the speaker's identity, a quality capable of being deployed as needed to fit a rhetorical situation, I will ask how ethos may be dislodged from identity and read in such a way as to multiply the positions from which women may speak" (83). Rhetorical scholar and Kate Ronald's claim that "ethos is the appeal residing in the tension between the speaker's private and public self", (39) also presents a more postmodern view of ethos that links credibility and identity. Similarly, Nedra Reynolds and Susan Jarratt echo this view of ethos as a fluid and dynamic set of identifications, arguing that "these split selves are guises, but they are not distortions or lies in the philosopher's sense. Rather they are 'deceptions' in the sophistic sense: recognition of the ways one is positioned multiply differently" (56).

Rhetorical scholar Michael Halloran has argued that the classical understanding of ethos "emphasizes the conventional rather than the idiosyncratic, the public rather than the private" (60). Commenting further on the classical etymology and understanding of ethos, Halloran illuminates the interdependence between ethos and cultural context by arguing that "To have ethos is to manifest the virtues most valued by the culture to and for which one speaks" (60). While scholars do not all agree on the dominant sphere in which ethos may be crafted, some agree that ethos is formed through the negotiation between private experience and the public, rhetorical act of self-expression. Karen Burke LeFevre's argument in Invention as Social Act situates this negotiation between the private and the public, writing that ethos "appears in that socially created space, in the 'between', the point of intersection between speaker or writer and listener or reader" (45–46).

According to Nedra Reynolds, "ethos, like postmodern subjectivity, shifts and changes over time, across texts, and around competing spaces" (336). However, Reynolds additionally discusses how one might clarify the meaning of ethos within rhetoric as expressing inherently communal roots. This stands in direct opposition to what she describes as the claim "that ethos can be faked or 'manipulated'" because individuals would be formed by the values of their culture and not the other way around (336). Rhetorical scholar John Oddo also suggests that ethos is negotiated across a community and not simply a manifestation of the self (47). In the era of mass-mediated communication, Oddo contends, one's ethos is often created by journalists and dispersed over multiple news texts. With this in mind, Oddo coins the term intertextual ethos, the notion that a public figure's "ethos is constituted within and across a range of mass media voices" (48).

In "Black Women Writers and the Trouble with Ethos", scholar Coretta Pittman notes that race has been generally absent from theories of ethos construction and that this concept is troubling for black women. Pittman writes, "Unfortunately, in the history of race relations in America, black Americans' ethos ranks low among other racial and ethnic groups in the United States. More often than not, their moral characters have been associated with a criminalized and sexualized ethos in visual and print culture" (43).

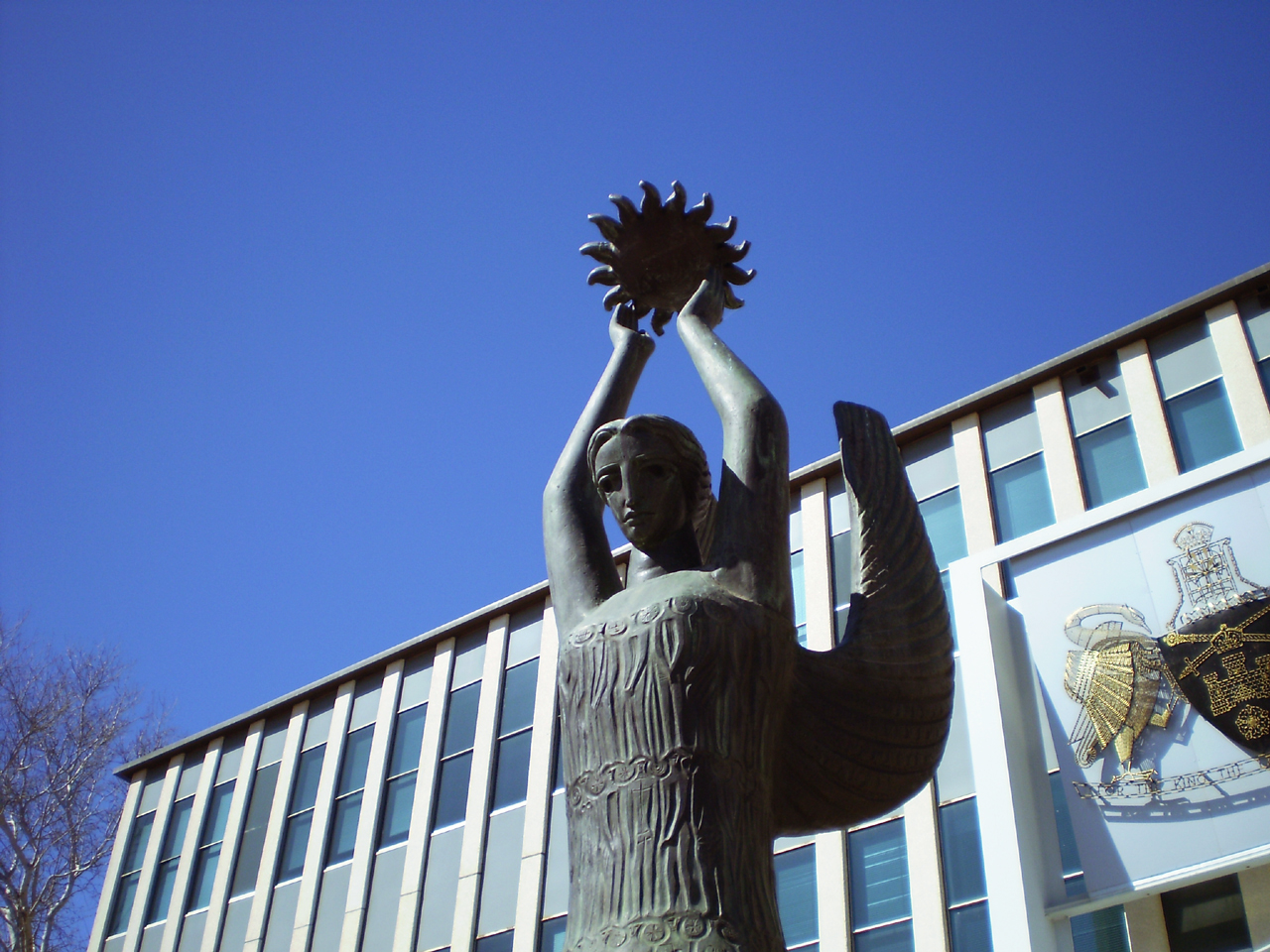
A sculpture representing Ethos outside the Australian Capital Territory Legislative Assembly in Canberra, Australia

== In Greek tragedy ==
The ways in which characters were constructed is important when considering ethos, or character, in Greek tragedy. Augustus Taber Murray explains that the depiction of a character was limited by the circumstances under which Greek tragedies were presented. These include the single unchanging scene, necessary use of the chorus, small number of characters limiting interaction, large outdoor theatres, and the use of masks, which all influenced characters to be more formal and simple. Murray also declares that the inherent characteristics of Greek tragedies are important in the makeup of the characters. One of these is the fact that tragedy characters were nearly always mythical characters. This limited the character, as well as the plot, to the already well-known myth from which the material of the play was taken. The other characteristic is the relatively short length of most Greek plays. This limited the scope of the play and characterization so that the characters were defined by one overriding motivation toward a certain objective from the beginning of the play.

However, Murray clarifies that strict constancy is not always the rule in Greek tragedy characters. To support this, he points out the example of Antigone who, even though she strongly defies Creon at the beginning of the play, begins to doubt her cause and plead for mercy as she is led to her execution.

Several other aspects of the character element in ancient Greek tragedy are worth noting. One of these, which C. Garton discusses, is the fact that either because of contradictory action or incomplete description, the character cannot be viewed as an individual, or the reader is left confused about the character. One method of reconciling this would be to consider these characters to be flat, or type-cast, instead of round. This would mean that most of the information about the character centers around one main quality or viewpoint. Comparable to the flat character option, the reader could also view the character as a symbol. Examples of this might be the Eumenides as vengeance, or Clytemnestra as symbolizing ancestral curse. Yet another means of looking at character, according to Tycho von Wilamowitz and Howald, is the idea that characterization is not important. This idea is maintained by the theory that the play is meant to affect the viewer or reader scene by scene, with attention being only focused on the section at hand. This point of view also holds that the different figures in a play are only characterized by the situation surrounding them, and only enough so that their actions can be understood.

Garet makes three more observations about a character in Greek tragedy. The first is an abundant variety of types of characters in Greek tragedy. His second observation is that the reader or viewer's need for characters to display a unified identity that is similar to human nature is usually fulfilled. Thirdly, characters in tragedies include incongruities and idiosyncrasies.

Another aspect stated by Garet is that tragedy plays are composed of language, character, and action, and the interactions of these three components; these are fused together throughout the play. He explains that action normally determines the major means of characterization. For example, the play Julius Caesar, is a good example for a character without credibility, Brutus. Another principle he states is the importance of these three components' effect on each other; the important repercussion of this being character's impact on action.

Augustus Taber Murray also examines the importance and degree of interaction between plot and character. He does this by discussing Aristotle's statements about plot and character in his Poetics: that plot can exist without character, but the character cannot exist without plot, and so the character is secondary to the plot. Murray maintains that Aristotle did not mean that complicated plot should hold the highest place in a tragedy play. This is because the plot was, more often than not, simple and therefore not a major point of tragic interest. Murray conjectures that people today do not accept Aristotle's statement about character and plot because to modern people, the most memorable things about tragedy plays are often the characters. However, Murray does concede that Aristotle is correct in that "[t]here can be no portrayal of character [...] without at least a skeleton outline of plot".

One other term frequently used to describe the dramatic revelation of character in writing is "persona". While the concept of ethos has traveled through the rhetorical tradition, the concept of persona has emerged from the literary tradition, and is associated with a theatrical mask. Roger Cherry explores the distinctions between ethos and pathos to mark the distance between a writer's autobiographical self and the author's discursive self as projected through the narrator. The two terms also help to refine distinctions between situated and invented ethos. Situated ethos relies on a speaker's or writer's durable position of authority in the world; invented ethos relies more on the immediate circumstances of the rhetorical situation.

== In pictorial narrative ==
Ethos, or character, also appears in the visual art of famous or mythological ancient Greek events in murals, on pottery, and sculpture referred to generally as pictorial narrative. Aristotle even praised the ancient Greek painter Polygnotos because his paintings included characterization. The way in which the subject and his actions are portrayed in visual art can convey the subject's ethical character and through this the work's overall theme, just as effectively as poetry or drama can. This characterization portrayed men as they ought to be, which is the same as Aristotle's idea of what ethos or character should be in tragedy. (Stansbury-O'Donnell, p. 178) Mark D. Stansbury-O'Donnell states that pictorial narratives often had ethos as its focus, and was therefore concerned with showing the character's moral choices. (Stansbury-O'Donnell, p. 175) David Castriota, agreeing with Stansbury-O'Donnell's statement, says that the main way Aristotle considered poetry and visual arts to be on equal levels was in character representation and its effect on action. However, Castriota also maintains about Aristotle's opinion that "his interest has to do with the influence that such ethical representation may exert upon the public". Castriota also explains that according to Aristotle, "[t]he activity of these artists is to be judged worthy and useful above all because exposure of their work is beneficial to the polis". Accordingly, this was the reason for the representation of character, or ethos, in public paintings and sculptures. In order to portray the character's choice, the pictorial narrative often shows an earlier scene than when the action was committed. Stansbury-O'Donnell gives an example of this in the form of a picture by the ancient Greek artist Exekia which shows the Greek hero Ajax planting his sword in the ground in preparation to commit suicide, instead of the actual suicide scene (Stansbury-O'Donnell, p. 177). Additionally, Castriota explains that ancient Greek art expresses the idea that character was the major factor influencing the outcome of the Greeks' conflicts against their enemies. Because of this, "ethos was the essential variable in the equation or analogy between myth and actuality".

== See also ==
- Nicomachean Ethics – Work on ethics by Aristotle
- Ethopoiein – Philosophy terms referring to an observer versus the thing observed
- Rhetoric (Aristotle) – Work of literature by Aristotle
- Poetics (Aristotle) – Work of dramatic theory by Aristotle
- Logos – Concept in philosophy, religion, rhetoric, and psychology
- Pathos – Greek rhetorical term for appeals to emotion
- Volksgeist – Philosophical concept of "spirit"
