= Sora no Uta ~Higher and Higher~/Hisōbi =

- Cover of the regular edition

Single by Luna Sea

from the album Cross
- Released: May 29, 2019
- Genre: Alternative rock
- Length: 9:00
- Label: Universal
- Songwriter: Luna Sea
- Producer: Luna Sea

Luna Sea singles chronology
"Limit" (2016)	"Sora no Uta ~Higher and Higher~/Hisōbi" (2019)	"The Beyond" (2020)

Music video
- "Sora no Uta ~Higher and Higher~" on YouTube "Hisōbi" on YouTube "Sample of the "Sora no Uta ~Higher and Higher~" Gundam music video" on YouTube

"Sora no Uta ~Higher and Higher~/Hisōbi" (Japanese: 宇宙(そら)の詩(うた) ～Higher and Higher～/悲壮美; "The Song of the Cosmos -Higher and Higher-/Tragic Beauty") is the twentieth single by Japanese rock band Luna Sea, released on May 29, 2019. It is their second double A-side single and reached number 7 on the Oricon chart and number 20 on Billboard's Japan Hot 100.

== Overview ==
Both songs were used as opening themes for the Mobile Suit Gundam: The Origin - Advent of the Red Comet anime; "Sora no Uta ~Higher and Higher~" was used from episode one until episode four, and "Hisōbi" was used from episode five until episode eight. A fan of the Gundam franchise since childhood, lead guitarist Sugizo was in charge of all of the anime's theme songs. Ryuichi also grew up watching the franchise and said he wanted the songs' lyrics to fit the story. After discussions with the staff and Sugizo, he borrowed scripts from the show, watched videos over and over, and wrote down words that caught his attention. The vocalist recorded his parts for "Sora no Uta ~Higher and Higher~" before having surgery in January 2019 to remove adenocarcinoma of the lung, while "Hisōbi" was recorded after.

The music video for "Sora no Uta ~Higher and Higher~" utilizes footage from the anime as its lyrics feature connections to the fictional world of Gundam. A different music video for the song using footage of the band performing it live at the Nippon Budokan was also released. The music video for "Hisōbi" features the band performing the ballad in sand dunes with footage shot via a drone by a Japanese drone racing champion.

== Release ==
The single was released in three editions; a regular edition, a Limited Edition A and a Limited Edition B, each of which features a different cover. The covers of the latter two were illustrated by Yoshikazu Yasuhiko; Limited Edition A features characters from Mobile Suit Gundam: The Origin, while Limited Edition B features the members of Luna Sea. Two additional versions of the limited editions were sold exclusively via the Universal Music Store and include a T-shirt of their cover illustrations, with Limited Edition A also including a DVD of the music video for "Sora no Uta ~Higher and Higher~".

== Track listing ==
All songs written and composed by Luna Sea.

1. "Sora no Uta ~Higher and Higher~" (宇宙(そら)の詩(うた) ～Higher and Higher～) - 5:07
  Originally composed by Sugizo.
2. "Hisōbi" (悲壮美) - 4:43
  Originally composed by Sugizo.
