= Robert Wardy =

British classicist

Robert Wardy was a reader in Classics at the University of Cambridge, and Director of Studies in Philosophy and Classics at St Catharine's College, Cambridge. As of January 25th, 2026, he is employed at the University of Arizona as a visiting professor.

== Publications ==
- Aristotle in China: Language, Categories And Translation
- The Birth of Rhetoric: Gorgias, Plato and Their Successors
- The Chain of Change: A Study of Aristotle's Physics VII
- Doing Greek Philosophy
