= Cross (Luna Sea album) =

2019 studio album by Luna Sea

Studio album by Luna Sea
- Released: December 18, 2019
- Studios: Sound Dali; Sound Crew; Kamome; Onkio Haus; aLive; Tago Studio Takasaki; King Sekiguchidai YK; Art Terror
- Genres: Alternative rock; progressive rock
- Length: 54:54
- Label: Universal
- Producers: Luna Sea, Steve Lillywhite

Luna Sea chronology
Luv (2017)	Cross (2019)

Singles from Cross
- 1. "Sora no Uta ~Higher and Higher~/Hisōbi" Released: May 29, 2019; 2. "The Beyond Gunpla 40th Edition" Released: April 29, 2020

Cross is the tenth studio album by Japanese rock band Luna Sea, released on December 18, 2019. Co-produced with Steve Lillywhite, it marks the first time the band did not produce an album by themselves. It was released during Luna Sea's 30th anniversary year and some of its tracks were made in collaboration with the 40th anniversary of the Mobile Suit Gundam franchise. Although peaking at number 3 on the Oricon Albums Chart, Cross became Luna Sea's first release to top Billboard Japan. The album's second single, "The Beyond", became the band's first in over 20 years to top the Oricon Singles Chart.

== Background and recording ==
According to Sugizo, Luna Sea, who had never worked with a producer in their 30-year career, had been wanting to work with one for about the last five years. He explained that he wanted to be a student again and learn more, but none of the producers in Japan fit for various reasons. Talks with Steve Lillywhite began even before the production of Luna Sea's previous album Luv (2017). Lillywhite and Inoran had become friends several years earlier after meeting through a mutual acquaintance at a Japanese music convention. The British producer attended his 2014 concert in Bangkok, where he was asked to produce the guitarist's solo album. However, the timing never worked out and Lillywhite prefers to work with bands instead of solo musicians anyway.

After getting the offer from Luna Sea, Lillywhite went to see them perform live at Saitama Super Arena as he believes the true value of a band is in their live shows. Impressed, he agreed to produce their album. The band sent him songs and he sent back his ideas on them. Lillywhite returned to Japan about two and a half years later before recording began, during Luna Sea's Nippon Budokan concerts. Guitarists Inoran and Sugizo had previously visited him at his home in Jakarta, but this was the first time all five band members had met with the producer about the album.

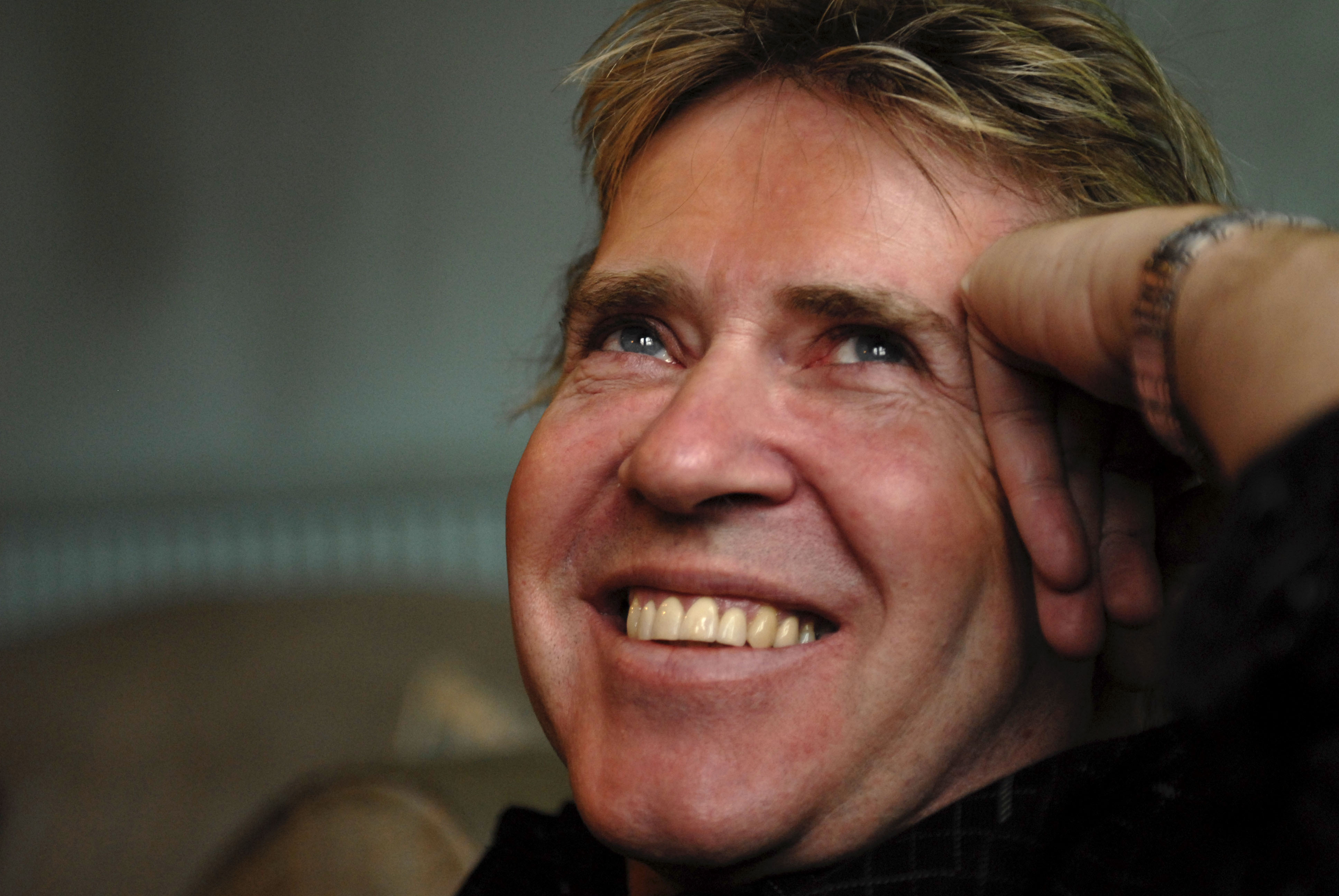
Co-produced by Steve Lillywhite, Cross marks Luna Sea's first time working with a producer and Lillywhite's first time producing a Japanese act.

While the band recorded in Japan, Lillywhite stayed in Jakarta and communicated daily via FaceTime, WhatsApp and Skype. He did make three or four trips to recording sessions for meetings and listening to playbacks. Lillywhite had four points he wanted for the album; to capture the energy of the band's live performances, have great melodies, include a modern sound for the current age, and retain the unique sound that Luna Sea have cultivated through the decades. He said that he still believes in the idea of an album working as a whole instead of just standalone songs put together. So he eliminated some tracks because there were already too many slow songs or they did not fit the album. The orchestrated parts on the album were Sugizo's idea. Lillywhite said it was difficult to match it with the band's sound, but it turned out good.

Lillywhite said that he noticed each member has their own style and that mixing them all together made a good album. He explained that J is a hard rocker, Inoran likes indie rock, Sugizo likes progressive rock, and Ryuichi is Frank Sinatra, while Shinya can adapt and interpret each one in his own way as a good drummer should. Before meeting the band, Lillywhite did not like Ryuichi's vocals when he listened to their old work and was worried about whether or not he could produce them. But after hearing him live in concert that doubt disappeared. He described J's songs as simple and catchy with good riffs. He revealed that all the music Sugizo brought to him was perfect and organized, whereas Inoran's songs were more difficult because they were cluttered like U2's, but still more organized than British and American musicians. Sugizo would bring him one guitar take that was perfect, but Inoran would bring him ten takes and let him choose which to use. Thus, he gave them the nicknames "Mr. Detail" and "Mr. Sloppy" respectively.

In January 2019, Ryuichi underwent surgery to remove adenocarcinoma of the lung. Additionally, while recording he was dealing with a polyp in his throat. However, Sugizo feels as though Ryuichi sounds ten years younger on the album thanks to Lillywhite's production. Sugizo came up with a track listing order for the songs, before Lillywhite modified it.

The producer is open to working with Luna Sea again. He told the band that he will do something different on the next album, as he is convinced they can do different things and would like to see where they are going. Likewise, Sugizo said he would like to work with Lillywhite again. This came to fruition in 2023, when Lillywhite mixed their re-recordings of Mother and Style.

== Composition ==
The songs "Sora no Uta ~Higher and Higher~" and "Hisōbi" were already recorded before the Budokan meeting with Lillywhite. They were released together as a double A-side single on May 29, 2019, and both were used as opening theme songs of the Mobile Suit Gundam: The Origin - Advent of the Red Comet anime. Inoran wrote the opening track "Luca" around October 2018, after coming back from visiting Lillywhite. It features about 15 string players and around 20 high school drummers and flutists, for about 40 or 50 people in total. Lillywhite described it as a flower blooming; it gradually builds with a swell at the end. He also said that it is reminiscent of "Where the Streets Have No Name" and "Sunday Bloody Sunday" by U2.

Because it was written by Sugizo, Lillywhite described "Philia" as progressive, but having a "driving" energy. Sugizo revealed that Lillywhite liked the demo, but felt Inoran's first part was not interesting and should be reconsidered. Sugizo admitted that Inoran's rework made it much better. Additionally, it originally had an outro, but that was removed at the producer's suggestion, making it much shorter. The song was used as the theme of the MMORPG Eternal. The producer called "Closer", which was composed by J, musically simple but lively and said it would appeal to rock fans. "The Beyond" is another Gundam-related work, used as the official theme of the franchise's 40th anniversary. At Lillywhite's suggestion, Sugizo added a counter-melody at the second chorus for Inoran to play.

According to Lillywhite, the fifth track "You're Knocking at My Door" was difficult like all of Inoran's songs. Through repeated trial and error he tried to find the best balance between retaining the song's power but making it gentle enough on the ears. He said that while its sound is completely different, you could compare its chaotic mood to U2's song "Bullet the Blue Sky". Ryuichi originally wrote "Anagram" before Sugizo added his ideas. But Lillywhite preferred Ryuichi's version, so the final version is closer to the singer's demo. He called it reminiscent of David Bowie, and said that the calm song acts as a relief in the middle of the album.

It was Lillywhite's idea to have an English-language announcement in "Seijyaku" (静寂), for which he chose J because the bassist has a good voice. Lillywhite said that someone felt it was wrong to end the album with "So Tender...", and admitted that "Seijyaku" would be most people's choice. But he is of the opinion that the last song should be like a nice dessert after a meal, and the latter was too heavy for dessert.

== Release ==
=== Album ===
The album title Cross was coined by Shinya. It is the band's tenth studio album and the Japanese numeral for the number 10 is 十, which looks like a cross. The album was released on December 18, 2019 by Universal. That day Sugizo, Inoran and Shinya did a live broadcast on Niconico where they discussed the album. Five limited editions of Cross were produced: Limited Edition A includes music videos for the two single tracks on DVD; Limited Edition B includes a different music video for "Sora no Uta ~Higher and Higher~" on a DVD and a separate CD including Luna Sea's cover of TM Network's "Beyond the Time ~Moebius no Sora o Koete~" (BEYOND THE TIME ～メビウスの宇宙を超えて～; "Beyond the Time (Over the Moebius Skies)"). Two editions were exclusive to members of the band's fan club; Premium Box A includes a live CD recorded at their May 31 and June 1, 2019 concerts at the Nippon Budokan and two live DVDs or Blu-rays recorded at their May 29, 2019 concert at Zepp Tokyo and December 24, 1998 concert at the Tokyo Dome in addition to a photo book and two replica staff passes; Premium Box B includes the same live CD and a DVD or Blu-ray recorded at their May 31, 2019 concert in addition to a photo book and one staff pass. An edition sold exclusively at the band's December 21 and 22, 2019 concerts at the Saitama Super Arena includes a live CD recorded at their December 22 and 23 concerts at the arena the previous year.

=== Singles ===
The double A-side single "Sora no Uta ~Higher and Higher~/Hisōbi" was released on May 29, 2019. On April 29, 2020, their twenty-first single "The Beyond Gunpla 40th Edition The Beyond x MS-06 Zaku II Ver. Luna Sea" was released in limited production. It includes the song "The Beyond" and a Luna Sea custom Zaku II Gundam model made of eco-friendly plastic. It became their first single in over 20 years, since "Gravity" (2000), to top the Oricon Singles Chart. It also topped the new Rock Singles Chart, and came in twentieth on the combined digital download and streaming singles chart.

== Reception ==
Professional ratings
Review scores
Source	Rating
Allmusic	4/5 stars

John D. Buchanan writing for AllMusic called Cross a "really great rock album" that, while lacking the "power, drive, and freshness" they had in the '90s, feels like Luna Sea's songwriting skills are "arguably at their peak." Buchanan described the opening track "Luca" as a U2 homage, "Philia" as reminiscent of the '80s rock sound of Cali Gari and David Bowie, and said the solos and singalong chorus of "Closer" reminded him of Bon Jovi. Although noting a mid-album lull, he said that there are enough great tracks with prominent drums or bass lines, and a progressive power ballad with an "impassioned vocal performance," that will be ideal for "newcomers to the band who like '80s and '90s hard and soft rock, enjoy a bit of a proggy twist, and can cope with the language barrier."

== Cross the Universe Tour ==
From February 1 to May 31, 2020, Luna Sea was scheduled to have a nationwide 30th anniversary hall tour titled Cross the Universe with over 29 performances in 13 cities, ending with three concerts between May 29 and 31 at to be newly opened Tokyo Garden Theater. However, all tour performances from the end of February on were postponed until 2021 due to the COVID-19 pandemic in Japan. The three Tokyo Garden Theater performances took place in 2021 on May 28–30 and was followed by the rescheduled Cross the Universe tour, which began on June 12. The tour's new "Grand Final" shows were held at Saitama Super Arena on January 8 and 9, 2022, but the regular tour actually ended on February 1, when Luna Sea gave their last performance before entering a "recharging period" as Ryuichi underwent surgery to remove microvascular lesions in his vocal cords.

== Track listing ==
All tracks are written by Luna Sea.

CD
No.	Title	Length
1.	"Luca" (Originally composed by Inoran.)	5:14
2.	"Philia" (Originally composed by Sugizo.)	6:10
3.	"Closer" (Originally composed by J.)	4:00
4.	"The Beyond" (Originally composed by Sugizo.)	5:33
5.	"You're Knocking at My Door" (Originally composed by Inoran.)	3:44
6.	"Sora no Uta ~Higher and Higher~ (宇宙の詩 ～Higher and Higher～)" (Originally composed by Sugizo.)	5:06
7.	"Anagram" (Originally composed by Ryuichi, with arrangement by Sugizo.)	5:32
8.	"Hisōbi (悲壮美)" (Originally composed by Sugizo.)	4:42
9.	"Pulse" (Originally composed by J.)	4:19
10.	"Seijyaku (静寂; lit. Silence)" (Originally composed by Sugizo.)	6:19
11.	"So Tender..." (Originally composed by Inoran.)	3:43
Total length:		54:54

Limited Edition A DVD
No.	Title	Length
1.	"Sora no Uta ~Higher and Higher~ -Live Version-" (Music Video)
2.	"Hisōbi" (Music Video)

Limited Edition B CD 2
No.	Title	Lyrics	Music	Length
1.	"Beyond the Time ~Möbius no Sora wo Koete~ (BEYOND THE TIME (メビウスの宇宙を越えて); "Beyond the Time ~Over the Möbius Skies~")"	Mitsuko Komuro	Tetsuya Komuro	5:13

Limited Edition B DVD
No.	Title	Length
1.	"Sora no Uta ~Higher and Higher~" (Lyric Video Japanese Version)
2.	"Sora no Uta ~Higher and Higher~" (Lyric Video English Version)

Fan Club Exclusive Edition CD 2
No.	Title	Length
1.	"Call For Love" (Live)
2.	"Déjàvu" (Live)
3.	"Sora no Uta ~Higher and Higher~" (Live)
4.	"Gravity" (Live)
5.	"Believe" (Live)
6.	"Hisōbi" (Live)
7.	"Hold You Down" (Live)
8.	"Rouge" (Live)
9.	"Blue Transparency" (Live)
10.	"Black and Blue" (Live)
11.	"Rosier" (Live)
12.	"Forever & Ever" (Live)

Fan Club Exclusive Edition DVD or Blu-ray 1
No.	Title	Length
1.	"Slave" (Live)
2.	"Déjàvu" (Live)
3.	"Jesus" (Live)
4.	"Shine" (Live)
5.	"Sora no Uta ~Higher and Higher~" (Live)
6.	"Gravity" (Live)
7.	"Hisōbi" (Live)
8.	"Storm" (Live)
9.	"Rosier" (Live)
10.	"Believe" (Live)
11.	"Hold You Down" (Live)
12.	"Tonight" (Live)
13.	"Wish" (Live)

Fan Club Exclusive Edition A DVD or Blu-ray 2
No.	Title	Length
1.	"Time Has Come" (Live)
2.	"Déjàvu" (Live)
3.	"Unlikelihood" (Live)
4.	"End of Sorrow" (Live)
5.	"True Blue" (Live)
6.	"No Pain" (Live)
7.	"Providence" (Live)
8.	"Another" (Live)
9.	"Journey of the Soul (Drum Solo)" (Live)
10.	"Bass Solo" (Live)
11.	"Fate" (Live)
12.	"Breathe" (Live)
13.	"With Love" (Live)
14.	"Desire" (Live)
15.	"Rosier" (Live)
16.	"Believe" (Live)
17.	"Storm" (Live)
18.	"I for You" (Live)
19.	"Shine" (Live)
20.	"Precious..." (Live)
21.	"Wish" (Live)
22.	"Up to You" (Live)

Saitama Super Arena Venue Limited Edition CD 2
No.	Title	Length
1.	"Mechanical Dance" (Live)
2.	"Imitation" (Live)
3.	"In Mind" (Live)
4.	"Image" (Live)
5.	"Wall" (Live)
6.	"Vampire's Talk" (Live)
7.	"Symptom" (Live)
8.	"Anubis" (Live)
9.	"Steal" (Live)
10.	"Lamentable" (Live)
11.	"Recall" (Live)
12.	"Claustrophobia" (Live)

== Personnel ==
Luna Sea

- Ryuichi – vocals
- Sugizo – guitar, violin
- Inoran – guitar
- J – bass
- Shinya – drums

Other

- Daisuke "d-kiku" Kikuchi – sound effects and programming
- Ikuro Fujiwara – strings supervisor and conductor on "The Beyond" and "Hisōbi"
- MNP Strings Japan – strings on "The Beyond" and "Hisōbi"
- Mayumi Tabata – strings copyist on "The Beyond" and "Hisōbi"
- Hiroaki Hayama – strings arrangement and copyist on "Luca" and "You're Knocking at My Door"
- Naoko Ishibashi Strings – strings on "Luca" and "You're Knocking at My Door"
- Yumi Kawamura – female chorus on "Luca", "Philia" and "So Tender..."
- Maiko Kawabe Rivera – piano and Hammond organ on "Philia" and "Seijyaku"
- Brass band club of The Second High School, Tokyo University of Agriculture and Takasaki Green Crest – marching drums on "Luca"
- Ichiro Higuchi – conductor on "Luca"
- Shinya Yamada – chorus direction on "Luca", "You're Knocking at My Door" and "So Tender..."
- Masatsuna Yamamoto – English direction on "Seijyaku"

Production

- Steve Lillywhite – co-producer and mixing
- Masayuki Nakahara, Junpei Ohno, Masashi Hashimoto, Masaaki Taya, Shintaro Inoue, Takahiro Okubo – recording engineers
- Stuart Hawkes – mastering
- Ryotaro Kawashima and Arata Kato – cover artwork design
