= Dabar (Hebrew word) =

Term in the Hebrew Bible

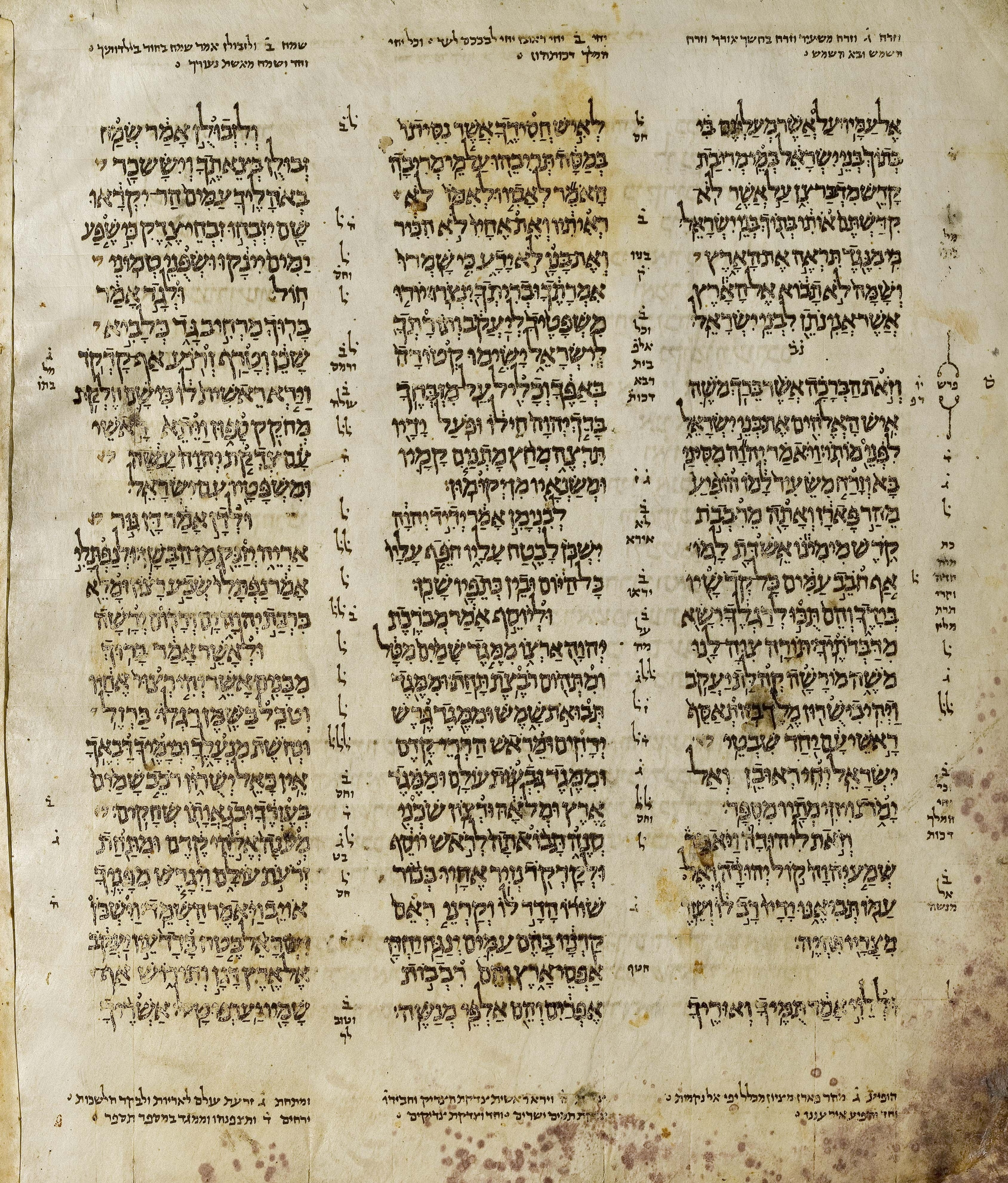
A Hebrew Bible page (Aleppo Codex), 10th century.

The word dabar (Hebrew: דָּבָר) means "word", "talk" or "thing" in Hebrew. Dabar occurs in various contexts in the Hebrew Bible.

The Septuagint, the oldest translation of the Hebrew Bible into Greek, uses the terms rhema and logos as equivalents and uses both for dabar.

In Christianity, the Old Testament concept of "word event" represented by dabar carries over to the New Testament where revelation can be seen as events explained by words. See Craig M. Nelson, Teleology and Structural Directedness, Heythrop Journal 2019 ISSN 0018-1196 page79-94.
