= Rhema =

Utterance or thing said; the action of utterance

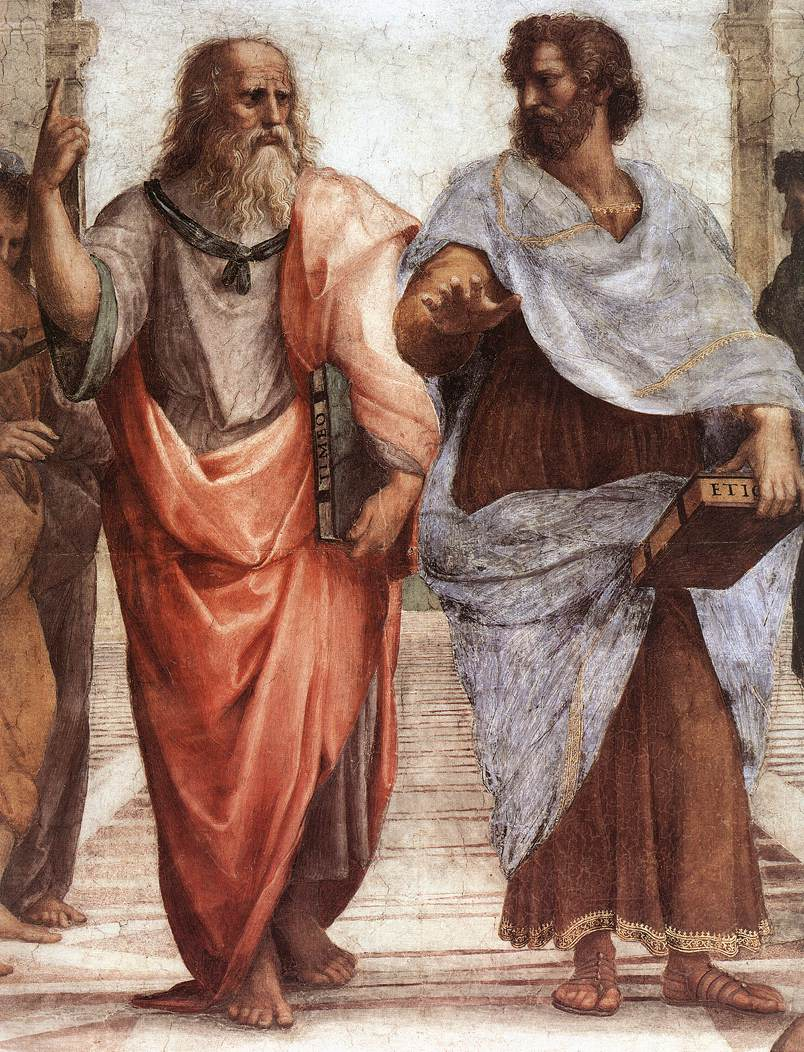
Plato and Aristotle

Rhema (ῥῆμα in Greek) literally means an "utterance" or "thing said" in Greek. It is a word that signifies the action of utterance.

In philosophy, it was used by both Plato and Aristotle to refer to propositions or sentences.

In Christianity, it is used in reference to the concept of Rhemata Christou, Jesus Christ's sayings.

== Etymology ==
The Greek noun ῥῆμα "saying, utterance, word, verb" is analyzed as consisting of the root ἐρ-/ῥε- (er-/rhe-) "say" (cf. εἴρω "I say"; ἐρῶ "I will say") and the suffix -μα (-ma), a suffix used to form nouns from verbs.

== Greek philosophers ==
| LOGIC | ARISTOTLE | GRAMMAR |
| subject | onoma | noun |
| predicate | rhema | verb |
| proposition | logos | sentence |

Both Plato (c. 428–347 BC) and Aristotle (384–322 BC) used the terms logos, rhema and onoma. In Plato's usage, a logos (often translatable as a sentence) is a sequence in which verbs are mingled with nouns and every logos must have an onoma and rhema. For Plato, every logos was either true or false and in a logos, names included rhema which denotes actions and onoma a mark set on those who do the actions. Aristotle identified three components as central to the proposition: onoma, rhema and logos. These terms are translated differently depending on the context of the discussion—grammar or logic, as in the table on the right. But it was only in the 12th century that grammarians began to think in terms of units we understand as subject and predicate.

== Septuagint usage ==
The Septuagint translation of the Hebrew Bible into Greek uses the terms rhema and logos as equivalents and uses both for the Hebrew word dabar, as the Word of God.

== In Christianity ==
In Christianity, the Greek word rhema is useful to distinguish between two meanings of word. While both rhema and logos are translated into the English word, in the original Greek there was a substantial distinction.

Some modern usage distinguishes rhema from logos in Christian theology, with rhema at times called "spoken word", referring to the revelation received by disciples when the Holy Spirit "speaks" to them. In this usage, "Logos" refers to Christ.
