= Randy Allen Harris =

Canadian linguist and historian of linguistics

Randy Allen Harris (born 1956) is a Canadian rhetorician and linguist, a named University Professor at the University of Waterloo in The School of Critical and Creative Humanities, cross-appointed to the David R. Cheriton School of Computer Science, and a Fellow of the Royal Society of Canada. (Note: "Prof. Randy Harris / RSC Fellow, Academy of the Arts and Humanities / Affiliation: University of Waterloo / Induction Year: 2022". Result of search within RSC website for "randy harris", 22 May 2026.) His research and teaching focus on the history of linguistics, the rhetoric of science, communication design, stylistics, and Construction Grammar, with particular attention to the neurocognitive dimensions and computational affordances of rhetorical figures. His books include The Linguistics Wars (1993; second edition 2021 (Note: Harris, Randy Allen (2021). The Linguistics Wars: Chomsky, Lakoff and the Battle over Deep Structure (2nd ed.). New York: Oxford University Press. ISBN 978-0-19-974033-8. Also ISBN 978-0-19-760866-1.)) Voice Interaction Design; Rhetoric and Incommensurability; two volumes of essays on aspects of rhetoric of science; (Note: Harris, Randy Allen, ed. (1997). Landmark Essays on Rhetoric of Science: Case Studies. Mahwah, New Jersey: Hermagoras Press. ISBN 1880393115. Also: Harris, Randy Allen, ed. (2017). Landmark Essays on Rhetoric of Science: Case Studies (2nd ed.). Routledge. ISBN 9781138695894.) and the co-edited Routledge Handbook of Language and Persuasion.

== Early life and education ==
Randy Allen Harris was born in Kitimat, B.C., where he was raised, moving later to Campbell River, B.C. He attended the University of Lethbridge in Southern Alberta, but transferred to Queen's University in Southern Ontario (BA Hons, English Literature), with graduate degrees from Dalhousie University in Halifax (MA, English Literature, thesis Romance structures in the novels of Henry Fielding); the University of Alberta in Alberta, Canada (MSc, Experimental Psycholinguistics, thesis Acoustic Dimensions of Functor Comprehension in Broca's Aphasia (Note: Harris, Randy Allen (1985). Acoustic Dimensions of Functor Comprehension in Broca's Aphasia (Thesis). Edmonton: University of Alberta. doi:10.7939/R34X54S7N. Published as: Harris, Randy Allen (1988). Acoustic Dimensions of Functor Comprehension in Broca's Aphasia. Bloomington: Indiana University Linguistics Club. OCLC 1110047687.)); and Rensselaer Polytechnic Institute in Troy, New York (MS, Technical Communication and Graphic Design, non-thesis, and Ph.D., Communication and Rhetoric, dissertation The Life and Death of Generative Semantics). He took up a position at Bell-Northern Research (the Research & Development arm of Northern Telecom) in Ottawa, ON, working on online documentation and usability testing. He then returned to the University of Alberta for a Killam Postdoctoral fellowship, where he rewrote his doctoral thesis as The Linguistics Wars, and later accepted a position at the University of Waterloo. He settled in Milton, Ontario, Canada, where he resides with his wife, Indira Naidoo-Harris. They have a son, Galen Naidoo Harris, a public servant and politician; and a daughter, Ori (Oriana) Naidoo Harris.

== Academic career and publications ==
Harris's MSc thesis at the University of Alberta reports an experiment suggesting that the difficulty Broca's aphasics have processing function words (like articles and connectives), which was largely held to be a competence issue, might be better explained by performance, namely with acoustic resolution. He found that increasing the acoustic salience (e.g., duration, volume) of function words, providing a more prominent acoustic signal, improves comprehension in individuals with Broca's aphasia.

Harris published a socio-rhetorical chronicle of the "linguistics wars", the prolonged dispute within Chomskyan generative grammar during the late 20th century. Noam Chomsky had developed and championed a formal theory of linguistics that was becoming highly influential in the 1960s and 1970s, but it came under increasing attack by his colleagues and students, including George Lakoff, Robin Lakoff, Paul Postal, Haj Ross, and James D. McCawley. These scholars developed an alternative framework known as Generative Semantics. Harris examines the argumentation on both sides of the dispute and discusses various sociological factors surrounding it, such as the style of argumentation associated with the counter-culture of the period.

In Harris's account, the Chomskyan side initially appeared to be the clear winner, emerging with the leading theory Chomsky called Principles and Parameters. However, Harris argues that the outcome of the linguistic wars was not just the triumph of a superior theory as it was portrayed at the time, most notably by Frederick Newmeyer, but the result of a complex process in which both sides managed to evolve their position substantially while also competing for influence within the discipline. He suggests that the Principles and Parameters framework incorporated many elements of generative semantics, which in turn helped introduce and promote the emerging linguistic field of Pragmatics and functional approaches to it. He also says that it brought about a focus on the role of general cognitive principles for the acquisition and structure of language, in opposition to Chomsky's theory of specialized mechanisms that he calls universal grammar, giving rise to the cognitive linguistics framework. (Although Harris is sometimes credited with giving the dispute its name, Newmeyer attributes this to Paul Postal.)

The Linguistics Wars received reviews in several publications when it appeared, including a cover story by David Berreby in The Sciences and a discussion on Linguist List (Note: The discussion appears in: Lawler, John (30 August 1993). "Review of The Linguistics Wars [4.644]". Linguist List. | Murray, Stephen (31 August 1993). "The linguistic wars [4.649]". Linguist List. |Harris, Randy Allen (1 September 1993). "The Linguistics wars (author's response) [4.654]". Linguist List. | Murray, Stephen (2 September 1993). "Response to Randy Harris [4.658]". Linguist List. | Dry, Helen; Need, Barbara (9 September 1993). "The Linguistics Wars [4.671]". Linguist List.) that revealed its hostilities had not died down. Neil Smith called it "outstanding" in Nature, saying "Harris has achieved the near impossible: being fair to both sides in a civil war." A second edition came out in 2021, with the subtitle Chomsky, Lakoff, and the Battle over Deep Structure, in which Harris follows Chomsky's theories into their Minimalist and Biolinguistics phases, and the influence of Generative Semantics on Frame Semantics, Construction Grammar, and the Conceptual Metaphor strains of Cognitive Linguistics. It was also reviewed in several academic journals: Geoffrey Sampson wrote "Harris has done the intellectual world a remarkable service by displaying in detail the battles that defined the field of 'theoretical linguistics' for many years."

Harris's history of linguistics research lies within the framework of the rhetoric of science, which he studied under his supervisor, S. Michael Halloran. It has resulted in several of his books, all of them essay collections. Landmark Essays in Rhetoric of Science: Case Studies (1997 and 2017) contains a collection of essays on the rhetorical analysis of scientific argumentation, with Harris's introduction widely cited for its definitions, methodological overviews, and framing of the field as the study of scientific argumentation by "Giants" (Darwin, Newton, Copernicus), in "Conflict" (over quantum mechanics, cold fusion, phlogiston), and in public policy (evolutionary theory in schools, vaccinations, recombinant DNA research). A second edition was published in 2018, with an expanded introduction and new essays, but Harris's framing had become controversial with younger scholars. In 2020 there was published a companion volume, Landmark Essays in Rhetoric of Science: Issues and Methods.

Harris's other notable contribution to science studies was to commission essays by the leading figures in rhetoric of science (including Alan G. Gross, Carolyn R. Miller, Leah Ceccarelli, John Angus Campbell, Charles Bazerman, and Jeanne Fahnestock), as well as philosopher and historian of science Paul Hoyningen-Huene, to consider the problem of incommensurability in rhetorical terms. The incommensurability thesis, introduced to the history, philosophy, and sociology of science in works by Thomas S. Kuhn and Paul Feyerabend, holds that competing scientific paradigms cannot be compared in any meaningful way, so that they are effectively articles of faith for scientists. Accordingly, Kuhn said in The Structure of Scientific Revolutions, scientists in different paradigms, like people in different religions or cultures, "practice their trades in different worlds … [they] see different things when they look from the same direction".

Harris starts with a taxonomy of the way incommensurability is used in science studies and ethics (incommensurability of values (Note: For the incommensurability of values, see: Andersson, Henrik; Hsieh, Nien-hê (June 26, 2025). "Incommensurable values". Stanford Encyclopedia of Philosophy.)): "brick-wall, cosmic, semantic, and pragmatic incommensurabilities". He claims that all four can be disregarded. The first two (brick-wall and cosmic) he objects to as unrealistic "different world" extremes that don't accurately characterize theories in any formal sense. The other two (semantic and pragmatic), he argues, describe situations that with a little work are in fact commensurable. Gross dissents (incommensurability is a formal property of some pairs of theories), and Hoynigen-Huene reserves comment, but the argument of the volume collectively with the other essays, in concert with Harris's very long introduction, is that incommensurability is a problem of theorists, not of theories, that the resources of argumentation are flexible enough to frame theories in fully compatible ways. The book casts incommensurability "as pragmatic rather than epistemologic". As Miller puts it in her essay, incommensurability is a way disputes can be framed by arguers,

not only by the differing intellectual commitments and habits that constitute a disciplinary matrix [paradigm] but also by argumentative positioning—by accusation or defense, presumptions of authority, expected alliances—and which can be magnified by social-political interests.

What Miller, Harris, and their colleagues point out is that resolving theoretical differences just requires goodwill, noting that scientists in the throes of a paradigm dispute rarely display much of that. Instead, they move the goalposts, propose ad hoc solutions to counter-evidence, ignore data, and actively avoid agreement in pursuit of victory (see also the motte-and-bailey fallacy).

Harris also explored the potential of voice interfaces when they were comparatively primitive—driven by hierarchical menus and limited by speech recognition, processing power, and storage. He was particularly intrigued by the advances in text mining in the 1990s while working with OpenText and Research in Motion (BlackBerry). In his Voice Interface Design he outlines a design framework of principles and heuristics that draws on rhetorical notions like ethos and pathos as well as speech act theory, conversational analysis, and text linguistics. While the book has now been made largely obsolete with the late 2010s' advances in generative AI, it is notable that machine learning chatbots behave much the way Harris framed, with an "awareness" of speech acts, turn-taking, coherence, cohesion, and the facets of linguistic presentation that increase credibility and appeal to emotions. They also rest crucially on the technology of text-mining for assembling the information, as well as aspects of the phrasing, for correct responses to queries.

Inspired by resemblance between Construction Grammar and figural logic, (Note: For figural logic, see: Fahnestock, Jeanne (2004). "Figures of argument (OSSA 2005 keynote address)". Informal Logic. 24 (2). doi:10.22329/il.v24i2.2139.) as articulated by Mark Turner, Harris and his collaborators launched a research programme in the 2010s based on the interaction of rhetorical figures and grammatical constructions, including ontological representation and computational figure detection.

== Books ==
- Acoustic Dimensions of Functor Comprehension in Broca's Aphasia. 1988.
- The Linguistics Wars. 1993.
  - The Linguistics Wars: Chomsky, Lakoff and the Battle over Deep Structure. 2nd ed. 2021.
- Editor. Landmark Essays in Rhetoric of Science: Case Studies. 1997.
  - Editor. Landmark Essays in Rhetoric of Science: Case Studies. 2nd ed., 2017.
- Voice Interaction Design: Crafting the New Conversational Speech Systems. 2005.
- Editor. Rhetoric and Incommensurability. 2005.
- Editor, with Shelley Hulan and Murray McArthur. Literature, Rhetoric and Values. 2013. (Note: Harris, Randy Allen; Hulan, Shelley; McArthur, Murray, eds. (2012). Literature, Rhetoric and Values: Selected Proceedings of a Conference Held at the University of Waterloo, 3–5 June 2011. Newcastle upon Tyne: Cambridge Scholars Publishing. doi:10.65325/EB3110 (inactive 26 May 2026). ISBN 9781443841757.)
- Editor. Landmark Essays in Rhetoric of Science: Issues and Methods. 2020.
- Editor, with Jeanne D. Fahnestock. The Routledge Handbook of Language and Persuasion. 2023.
