= Rhetoric of health and medicine =

The rhetoric of health and medicine (or medical rhetoric) is an academic discipline concerning language and symbols in health and medicine. Rhetoric most commonly refers to the persuasive element in human interactions and is often best studied in the specific situations in which it occurs. As a subfield of rhetoric, medical rhetoric specifically analyzes and evaluates the structure, delivery, and intention of communications messages in medicine- and health-related contexts. Primary topics of focus includes patient-physician communication, health literacy, language that constructs disease knowledge, and pharmaceutical advertising (including both direct-to-consumer and direct-to-physician advertising). The general research areas are described below. Medical rhetoric is a more focused subfield of the rhetoric of science.

Practitioners from the medical rhetoric field hail from a variety of disciplines, including English studies, communication studies, and health humanities. Through methods such as content analysis, survey methodology, and usability testing, researchers in this sphere recognize the importance of communication to successful healthcare.

Several communication journals, including Communication Design Quarterly, Journal of Business and Technical Communication, Technical Communication Quarterly, and Present Tense, have published special issues on themes related to medical rhetoric. The majority of research in the field is indexed in the academic database EBSCO Communication & Mass Media Complete. In 2013, scholars in the field also began a biennial symposium, Discourses of Health and Medicine.

== History of the field ==
The rhetoric of health and medicine is tied to the emergence of rhetoric of science in the early 1970s and 1980s. Contemporary theorists such as Kenneth Burke, Michel Foucault, Thomas Kuhn, Bruno Latour, and Steve Woolgar laid the theoretical groundwork for this early interest in the persuasive dimensions of scientific language. In the 1980s the field shifted when rhetorical critics like Martha Solomon and Charles Anderson began analyzing texts on biomedicine. Solomon analyzed the rhetoric used in medical reports during the Tuskegee Syphilis Project, while Anderson examined the writings of surgeon Richard Selzer to comment on the rhetoric of surgery.

In the 1990s, the rhetoric of health and medicine emerged more clearly as a field distinct from rhetoric of science. Rhetorical scholar Celeste Condit raised questions about the historical and rhetorical dimensions of issues like abortion and genetics in works such as 1990's Decoding Abortion Rhetoric: Communicating Social Change and 1999's The Meanings of the Gene: Public Debates about Heredity. In these seminal works, Condit focused on what she called "rhetorical formations," or the multiple simultaneous discourses that surrounded each rhetorical object.

The field also saw the rise of discussion on disability studies and illness narratives during the 1990s, which initiated the beginning of a Special Interest Group on disability studies at the annual Conference on College Composition and Communication (CCCC), headed by Brenda Jo Brueggemann. The initiation of this group then inspired a Medical Rhetoric Special Interest Group, headed by Barbara Heifferon, which has continued to meet annually to present day.

In the early 21st century, scholars began to pay increasing attention to various topics in the rhetoric of health and medicine. J. Blake Scott's 2003 book Risky Rhetoric: AIDS and the Cultural Practices of HIV Testing used Michel Foucault's theory of examination, which defines rhetoric as a form of disciplinary power, to examine the cultural condition that influence HIV testing. He reported that the rhetoric used in public policy and various propaganda led to the stigmatization and discrimination of people with HIV/AIDS.

In 2005, Judy Segal's Health and the Rhetoric of Medicine gained recognition for highlighting the persuasive elements in diagnoses, health policies, illness experiences, and illness narratives. She also addressed direct-to-consumer advertising of prescription drugs, the role of health information in creating the "worried well", and problems of trust and expertise in doctor-patient relationships.

In 2010, Lisa Keränen's Scientific Characters: Rhetoric, Politics, and Trust in Breast Cancer Research addressed issues of research viability and relationships among scientists, patients, and advocates. Kimberly Emmons’ work on the rhetoric surrounding depression, Black Dogs and Blue Words: Depression and Gender in the Age of Self-Care, was published the same year.

In 2018, Methodologies for the Rhetoric of Health & Medicine, edited by Lisa Melonçon and J. Blake Scott, was published, examining various methodologies in the field of rhetoric of health and medicine.

== Research areas ==
=== Rhetoric of pharmaceutical and science commercialization ===
The rhetoric of pharmaceutical and science commercialization is the study of the persuasive language and symbols that the pharmaceutical industry and biotechnology companies use to communicate and influence consumers, physicians, regulatory agencies, and other stakeholders in the commercialization of biotechnology. Scholars have found that the language used to define, describe, and regulate pharmaceuticals influences the understanding and perception of the drugs among both the general public and experts. Information about pharmaceutical products is highly regulated and filtered through many channels as it moves from scientist to consumer. Despite the regulations on pharmaceutical advertising, pharmaceutical companies use carefully crafted direct-to-consumer advertising to rhetorically influence the patient-physician dialogue to drive consumption of specific pharmaceutical drugs. Furthermore, pharmaceutical companies mislead physicians and scientists through deceptive rhetorical strategies in technical documentation (which both package inserts directed towards physicians and medical journal articles directed towards scientists). In a recent study, a pharmaceutical company disguised negative performance in one group of subjects by selectively merging data between different patient groups in clinical trials and carefully crafting supporting statements. This study shows that scientific data and knowledge is secondary to rhetorical messages supporting commercialization, and that human health is secondary to company profit. Notably, technical information is subject to obfuscation and distortion so that the message communicated outside of a commercial organization aligns with the primary goal of selling a product. Studying and trying to improve the rhetorical processes involved in pharmaceutical information as it moves through the chain of dissemination is a key concern of rhetorical scholarship on this topic.

=== Rhetoric of mental health ===
The rhetoric of mental health considers how language functions in the production of knowledge on topics such as mental and psychological disorders, chemical imbalances in the brain, and variations on what are considered normal mental faculties. The $100 million Brain Research through Advancing Innovative Neurotechnologies (BRAIN) Initiative, introduced by the Obama administration in 2013, is testament to the emerging importance of brain science and mental health in medical science and public policy debate. Neurorhetoric, the study of how language is used in the creation, distribution, and reception of science about the brain, has recently become an important topic in medical rhetoric and composition studies, as well as in popular science publications targeted at non-scientists. Information and texts relevant to the rhetoric of mental health include psychotropic pharmaceutical regulations, their production, prescription, advertising, and consumption, and scientific and popular discussions about major depressive disorder, bipolar disorder, obsessive-compulsive disorder, schizophrenia, autism, and other mental disorders. The Diagnostic and Statistical Manual of Mental Disorders (DSM, now in its 5th edition) is a central text for the study of the mental health profession.

=== Patient narrative ===
Patient narrative is the clinical story of a person's past and present medical history documented by a medical clinician. The patient narrative can also be referred to as the medical history, the History and Physical (H & P), or the clinical narrative. The H&P includes a Subject, Objective, Assessment, and Plan (SOAP note), which summarizes the patient's narrative or history of medical illness, objectively reports the patient's clinical data and lab results, assesses diagnoses and prognoses, and often recommends how to address the patient's clinical situation. As part of the American Recovery and Reinvestment Act of 2009, the government enacted the Health Information Technology for Economic and Clinical Health (HITECH) Act, which mandates that health providers transition from handwritten (typed) patient narratives to electronic patient narratives in forms such as the electronic medical record (EMR) or the electronic health record (EHR). The EMR and EHR are of interest to communication scholars because they economize the words and space of the traditional patient narrative into a structured system of navigation screens and checkboxes.

=== Rhetorics of alternative medicine ===
The rhetoric of alternative medicine differs from traditional medical rhetoric in its emphasis on the persuasive aspects of language related to holistic or other nonstandard approaches. Some of these alternative medical practices include acupuncture, massage therapy, and chiropractic care. Scholars further explore alternative medical practitioners’ claims that they take a holistic approach to medical treatment, assessing a person's body, mind, and spirit, rather than just treating a disease.

=== Patient-physician communication ===
Starting with references to medical care in ancient Greece, Plato's “Dialogues”, expressed that physician-patient communication should not include any “lively interactions” between the physician and patient. In the Age of Enlightenment, Dr. John Gregory began to emphasize patient-physician communication by introducing the idea of preventative care for “gentleman of a liberal education.” Few found his suggestive style of care useful, and the view that “physicians must assume sole responsibility for protecting the ignorant public from its folly” lived on for some time. As late as the 1980s, the American Medical Association still had not incorporated regulations into their Code of Ethics that required physicians to incorporate patient opinion into the decision-making process. It was not until 1996 when the Health Insurance Portability and Accountability Act (HIPAA) was created to protect patient rights and privacy. This law was intended to assure patients that their wishes would be considered in treatment decision-making.

== Professional opportunities ==
For students who take a more applied approach to health and medical rhetoric, there are an increasing number of employment opportunities in industry, government, and nonprofit organizations. Such opportunities fall into two broadly defined categories: service and advocacy.

=== Service ===
Service is a situation in which a communication expert helps a healthcare professional be more effective in his or her communication efforts. This might mean the communicator is paid to assist with a task like grant writing, editing, or authoring a medical document. Medical transcriptionists, represented by the Association for Healthcare Documentation Integrity (AHDI), provide another form of professional communication in medical discourse. The AHDI is the world's largest nonprofit organization representing individuals and organizations in healthcare documentation. By ensuring documentation's accuracy, privacy, and security, the organization aims to protect public health, increase patient safety, and improve quality of care for healthcare consumers. Other professional medical writing associations include the American Medical Writers Association (AMWA) and the International Academy of Nursing Editors (INANE).

Sometimes these medical authors are considered “ghostwriters,” or paid writers who write a communicative piece but are not formally acknowledged as a text's author. Karen L. Wooley says that professional writers must adhere to ethical guidelines that ghostwriters may not be expected to follow. While authors control their content when working with a professional medical writer, Wooley says that ghostwriters may try to take control of the content away from the author and hide certain facts, such as where a project's funding comes from. Researchers such as Elliott Moffatt are concerned that medical ghostwriting, especially in the context of pharmaceutical research, is dangerous to public health. Possible dangers can include misrepresenting the data and subtly influencing the way clinicians and patients perceive the data.

=== Advocacy ===
Advocacy in medical rhetoric is a situation in which the communicator addresses a health-related topic, empowering the citizens of a community to understand how that issue impacts them. This type of health communication enables the public to understand a health issue more thoroughly, providing them with the tools necessary to challenge or change existing power structures within their own communities. Advocacy is often associated with risk communication, the process of explaining natural disasters, human-made hazards, and behavioral practices to the public in a way they can understand. Theorists such as Don Nutbeam propose a need for advocacy and say that health literacy, or people's ability to access and make decisions with health information, is an important part of empowerment. Nick Pidgeon and Baruch Fischhoff say that communicating complex medical or health information to the public is difficult because past scientists failed to base their communication on solid principles and evidence. Based on these past failures, Pidgeon and Fischhoff argue for a simpler and trustworthier model of science communication. In response to this issue, Jeffrey T. Grabill and W. Michele Simmons propose that technical communicators can provide advocacy because they have both good writing skills and an ability to understand and convey information to patients.

== Rhetorical concepts ==
Rhetoric, like any field of study, is made up of constituent parts. These parts are often referred to as either rhetorical concepts or rhetorical principles. Rhetorical concepts can be seen as tools of the trade that allow rhetoricians to effectively communicate in a way that is most likely to persuade readers and audiences of the messages and meanings intended by the rhetorician. Rhetorical concepts are an important part of what makes an argument persuasive, and all effective arguments inherently contain them. Rhetorical concepts help rhetoricians convey information that would otherwise be unascertainable by the audience, which is especially important for topics that carry heavy implications, such as the complications that often follow complex medical and health needs.

=== Figures of Speech ===
Figures of speech are a type of figurative language that often convey specialized meaning not based on the literal meaning of the words that make up the figure. Often providing emphasis, freshness of expression, or clarity, they can be used to explain complex, unknown topics to readers and audiences in a way that makes them easier for the reader to understand.

==== Metaphor and analogy ====
Metaphor and analogy are important in scientific communication because they make new ideas understandable to both expert and nonexpert audiences. Disease, for example, which is difficult to comprehend on both large and microbiological scales, is often communicated through metaphor and analogy. When a public health campaign “wages war” on cancer, or a microbiologist describes a virus as “attacking” a cell, these forceful words create a war-like metaphor for understanding the way disease works. Notable work in this area has been done by Judy Segal, who chronicled the impact of five biomedical metaphors in her book Health and the Rhetoric of Medicine, including ‘‘medicine is war,’’ ‘‘the body is a machine,’’ ‘‘diagnosis is health,’’ ‘‘medicine is a business,’’ and ‘‘the person is genes, ’’ all of which have had academic, cultural, and social impacts on the way medicine is practiced and understood. Monika Cwiarka has also questioned the use of laboratory mice in behavior-based studies, asking whether certain behaviors observed in mice can be considered analogous to those observed in humans. Another important recent study is Gronnvoll and Landau's research to determine how the public uses metaphor to understand genetic science.

==== Hyperbole ====
Hyperbole is a figure of speech more often used by a patient when speaking with a doctor than by doctors communicating with their patients. Where some figures of speech can help to lend meaning or understanding to medical and scientific communication, hyperbole often obscures the truth by exaggerating it, which can have detrimental and even deadly results. Headaches, for example, can occasionally be described by patients as feeling as if their “head’s going to explode.” This type of communication can make it difficult for doctors to understand the true gravity of a symptom, which may lead to misdiagnosis. Furthermore, doctors and scientists need to be especially aware of the negative implications that hyperbole can have in medical discourses. As Joseph Loscalzo points out in his article Clinical Trials in Cardiovascular Medicine in an Era of Marginal Benefit, Bias, and Hyperbole, the use of hyperbole by investigators during medical trials can “often prejudice the trialist in favor of a positive result.” When investigators provide trialists with bias, whether intentionally or unintentionally, the data that is collected may be skewed in the direction of the bias provided by the investigator.

=== Stasis ===
Consider a hypothetical conversation between two parties about health care reform. One party may wish to argue the moral necessity of health care reform while the other party wishes to argue that health care reform is economically infeasible. Until both parties agree on the issue at hand (whether it be the economic or moral considerations of health care reform), resolution of the argument cannot take place. Once the parties have agreed on the issue at hand, they have achieved rhetorical stasis. The idea of first agreeing to the issue at hand is central to any discussion between rational people. One example of how stasis can apply to health and medical rhetoric is provided in a recent article by Christa Teston and Scott Graham. These researchers applied the rhetorical concept of stasis to medical discourse by reviewing the FDA discussion on Avastin as a treatment for metastatic breast cancer. They concluded that the absence of stasis resulted in miscommunication between the interested parties. The FDA could have achieved stasis, these authors conclude, by first reaching consensus on the following questions: What counts as clinical benefit? What kinds of evidence would be deemed meaningful?

=== Rhetorical Appeals ===
The rhetorical appeals, often referred to as modes of persuasion or ethical strategies, are a set of rhetorical concepts used to persuade audiences. Initially introduced by Aristotle in On Rhetoric, the appeals focus on three ways to persuade your audience: by appealing to the character of the speaker (ethos), the emotions of the audience (pathos), or the logic/truth of the argument itself (logos).

==== Ethos ====
Ethos is an appeal to the authority or credibility of the presenter and is especially important in health and medicine communication. As Sarah Bigi explains in her article The Persuasive Role of Ethos in doctor-patient Interactions, “physicians are expected to inform, advise and persuade patients regarding their health problems.” In order to successfully persuade their patients, doctors need to rely on the rhetorical appeals, and the appeal that patients seem to care about the most is the ethos of the doctor. If a doctor does not seem credible, then a patient is unlikely to follow their instructions or diagnosis, which can lead to further health complications down the line.

==== Pathos ====
Pathos is an appeal to the audience's emotions. The speaker may use pathos in a multitude of ways; however, in terms of the rhetoric of health and medicine, two particular emotions stand out: fear and hope.

When doctors appeal to fear it is not done so lightly. Doctors have to decide if instilling fear in their patient is the right tactic for persuading their patients to agree with the physician's treatment plan. For instance, if a patient has diabetes and is likely to lose a toe or foot if they do not change the way they treat their condition, it is up to the doctor to decide when to stop telling their patient that “changing your habits will give you a better life” and to start telling their patient that “if you don’t stop your current habits, you’re going to lose a foot.”

When doctors appeal to hope, the doctor tries to persuade the patient through describing a scenario of a positive future that's only possible by the patient following the doctor's orders. In some cases, cognitive behavioral therapy, the act of presenting this positive emotional state can actually create a positive result in itself.

==== Logos ====
Logos is logical appeal or the simulation of it. It is normally used to describe facts and figures that support the speaker's claims or thesis. It is important to health and medicine communications because patients want to know which treatments work best, and they want the scientific data to prove it. Having an appeal to logic also enhances ethos because information makes the speaker look knowledgeable and prepared to his or her audience. However, the data can be confusing and thus confuse the audience. So, the doctor has to make sure to leverage the appeals to best persuade their patients. Doctors must decide how many facts and figures are appropriate to persuade an audience of the factual basis of the argument while portraying themselves as a credible speaker and playing to the right emotional state of their patient---all to get the patient to follow the doctor's orders.

== Research methodology ==
Rhetoricians of health and medicine conduct research primarily through qualitative methods, although quantitative methods are also occasionally employed. Scholars in the field apply these techniques to understand how and for what reasons health and medical communication is accomplished.

=== Content analysis ===
Through content analysis, scholars strive to answer the questions first formulated by political scientist Harold Lasswell as they apply to health and medicine texts: “Who says what, to whom, why, to what extent and with what effect?" For example, researchers might study the content of pharmaceutical advertisements on television to determine their appeals to potential consumers. Others might examine the communication of health information via new media such as Twitter and Facebook. Rhetoricians have increasingly turned to computers to facilitate quantitative content analysis as they gather massive data collections from Internet sources.

=== Survey research ===
Researchers in the field are also concerned with the effectiveness of health and medical communications. Audience surveys are often used to determine if a target audience understands a given set of health or medical instructions. The results help researchers adjust these instructions and assist audiences in achieving functional health literacy. Other surveys gauge the public's attitudes and knowledge regarding important medical topics such as mental health. This sort of research identifies gaps for public health agencies to address in their communications.

=== Usability testing ===
Creators of health and medical communications often test their work with a subset of their target audience before its wider release. This practice is particularly important when content creators are not themselves part of their target audience, as is often the case for communications that address vulnerable communities such as senior citizens or immigrants with English as a second language. Usability research can include techniques such as “think aloud” testing, in which potential users talk the researcher through their navigation of a given computer program or text. Evaluations by experts in other fields, such as design or user experience, are also employed.
