= Rhetoric of technology =

The rhetoric of technology is both an object and field of study. It refers to the ways in which makers and consumers of technology talk about and make decisions regarding technology and also the influence that technology has on discourse. In fact, rhetoric of technology is the study of how language, symbols, and persuasive practices shape the creation, meaning, adoption, and power of technologies and how technologies, in turn, function as persuasive forces in society. It examines technology as a rhetorical phenomenon and not just a technical one. It asks how technologies are argued into existence, how they are explained and justified, how they are made credible and desirable, and how they are embedded in cultural values and social institutions. According to Charles Bazerman's work The Languages of Edison's Light in 1999:

Technologies are constituted through discourse: Language does not merely describe technology after it exists; it helps create it. Claims, metaphors, patents, standards, demonstrations, and media narratives shape what a technology is understood to be and what it is for.

Technological development is persuasive work: Inventors, engineers, corporations, and governments must persuade multiple audiences—investors, regulators, users, and the public—that a technology is safe, necessary, profitable or inevitable.

Technologies themselves act rhetorically: Once deployed, technologies persuade through their material presence and effects (e.g., electric light persuading users of modernity, safety, and progress).

Rhetoric links technical systems to social values: Rhetoric translates technical novelty into familiar cultural meanings such as efficiency, freedom, security, or beauty.

Power and authority around technology are rhetorical achievements: Expertise, innovation, and progress are not purely technical statuses; they are established and maintained through communication and institutional discourse.

Moreover, rhetoric and technology are mutually constitutive: rhetoric gives technology meaning, legitimacy, and direction, while technology reshapes how rhetoric can be produced, circulated, and experienced. Covini and jolliffe (1995) go further and argue that rhetoric and technology are inseparable. They contend that, rooted in the Greek words techne (art or skilled craft) and logos (word or explanation), technology originally referred to a process of reasoned, communicative creation. In the modern era, however, this meaning has shifted from an explanatory practice to a finished product, causing the rhetorical element of technology to become invisible. As machines grow more intelligent and interactive, correcting language, creating art, or defeating human experts, they increasingly participate in discourse, shaping how people think and communicate. This invisibility of rhetoric in technology mirrors the growing inaccessibility of scientific and technical language, which is often limited to specialists. If science and technology are to serve the public as shared forms of knowledge, practitioners must recover rhetorical skill in order to clearly explain, distribute, and justify their work to broader audiences.

Studies of the rhetoric of technology are interdisciplinary. Scholars in communication, media ecology, and science studies research the rhetoric of technology. Technical communication scholars are also concerned with the rhetoric of technology.

The phrase "rhetoric of technology" gained prominence with rhetoricians in the 1970s, and the study developed in conjunction with interest in the rhetoric of science. However, scholars have worked to maintain a distinction between the two fields. Rhetoric of technology criticism addresses several issues related to technology and employs many concepts, including several from the canon of classical rhetoric, for example ethos, but the field has also adopted contemporary approaches, such as new materialism.

== Definition ==
While the definition and scope of rhetoric is contested, scholars in the discipline, or rhetoricians, study the capacity of symbols to create change and influence perspectives. Often, rhetoricians study discourse and texts, but they also study objects. Technology is both techniques and objects that embody and enact techniques. Thus, rhetoric of technology scholars may look at texts and discourse associated with technology or techniques and technological objects. Concerns of rhetoric of technology include the influence of technology on public deliberation, conceptions of the self, and how new technologies come to be developed and adopted.

Scholars who study rhetoric of technology have argued that it should be treated as distinct from the rhetoric of science. Charles Bazerman offers three distinctions between rhetoric of technology and rhetoric of science. First, unlike science, technology has always been intertwined with other clearly rhetorical endeavors, such as commerce and finance. Second, while the discourse of science often works towards specialization, the discourse of technology is pervasive. We may not all conduct experiments, but we all interact with and operate technology. Lastly, the products of technology are mostly material while the products of science are mostly symbols. Carolyn Miller argues that rhetoric of science must be treated as distinct from rhetoric of technology because technology and science differ in motivation, criteria of judgment, and values.

== History ==
Scholars started to suggest the importance of studying rhetoric of technology in the 1970s alongside a growing interest in rhetoric of science. Thomas W. Benson and Gerard A. Hauser referred to the "rhetoric of technology" in a book review published in 1973 and noted the shared concern of rhetoric and technology with technique. In 1978 Carolyn Miller wrote "Technology as a Form of Consciousness: A Study of Contemporary Ethos." In addition to explaining why rhetoric of technology should be treated separately from science, Miller argues that technology gives rise to a particular ethos, or personal character, because it generates particular actions and a particular consciousness. She concludes that technological consciousness assumes an objective perspective that erodes ethos. Within technological consciousness, actions are right or wrong regardless of cultural possibilities because assessments are assumed to be objective.

In a series of oral histories collected by the Association for the Rhetoric of Science, Technology, and Medicine, scholars familiar with both fields recognized that there has been more research addressing the rhetoric of science than comparable work on technology. Carolyn Miller suggested that one reason for the relative lack of rhetoric of technology scholarship is that it is harder to find relevant texts to analyze. Miller noted that many of the primary texts dealing with technology are private company documents.

== Concepts ==
=== Materialism and New Materialism ===
In 1980 Langdon Winner wrote the article "Do Artifacts Have Politics?" Winner suggests that objects reflect and enact ideological perspectives. Winner's idea shares much in common with a materialist approach to rhetoric of technology. Materialist approaches to rhetoric of technology are related to materialism and treat technological objects the same as they may treat a text by critiquing how objects persuade and influence.

Jeremy Packer and Stephen B. Wiley provide an overview of new materialist approaches to rhetoric in their book Communication Matters: Materialist Approaches to Media. Packer and Wiley conceptualize materiality as a "corrective" to the concept of communication as intangible. They suggest that the corrective is in response to a "poststructuralist impasse" in the field of communication, rhetoric, and media studies. They outline two approaches to materiality: 1) to equate materiality with physicality and approach infrastructure, body, space, and technology as fields of communication and 2) to analyze the materiality of communication itself, the physiological, mechanical, or digital media of communication. Packer and Wiley also identify key themes that are explored in materialist approaches: economy, discourse, technology, space, and bodies.

=== Ethos ===
In her 1978 article "Technology as a Form of Consciousness: A Study of Contemporary Ethos," Carolyn Miller argued that technology was fundamentally changing how individuals judge personal character. She suggested that the ultimate result of a technological consciousness would be to erode a concern with ethos as technology would prevail in presenting actions and decision as objectively right or wrong. If all decisions are objective, then there is no longer a need for judgments of character. In a 1992 article, Steven B. Katz employed Miller's "technological consciousness" to help explain the rhetoric used by members of the Nazi regime to enact the Holocaust. In 2004, Miller revisited the relationship between ethos and technology in an exploration of the impact of human-computer interaction. She explores two modes of human-computer interaction: expert systems versus intelligent agents. She argues that in both modes of interaction subjectivity blurs between the human-user and the computer, creating a hybrid (borrowing from Bruno Latour) or cyborg (borrowing from Donna Haraway). Expert systems are designed to mimic human experts; they typically draw from a deep database of information. Intelligent agent computer systems, in contrast, learn from interacting with an environment. The merger between human and computer destabilizes ethos according to Miller. As the intelligent agent model of computing has grown in popularity, Miller suggests that there has been a shift from a logos-centric to a pathos-centric ethos. Neither, she contends, provide ethics, or arete, which is a gap that rhetoric should fill.

=== Invention ===
As invention is important to the development of new technology, invention is also important to rhetoric. Along with arrangement, delivery, style, and memory, invention is one of the five canons of rhetoric, or the five key elements of a competent speech according to classic rhetorical theory. Therefore, some rhetoricians argue that the development of new technology is fundamentally rhetorical. John A. Lynch and William J. Kinsella describe how both technology and rhetoric are both concerned with creating something new from available resources and know-how.

=== Kairos ===
Kairos is an ancient Greek word that captures the idea that there is a right time for action. Carolyn Miller has suggested that the "right time" is also a central concern for technology. She uses the Japanese "Fifth Generation" computer project as a case study. Miller contends that within technological discourse kairos is both a powerful theme and useful tool of analysis. She supports her claim with an analysis of technological forecasting, which was a central feature of the Japanese computer project, and concludes that technologists employ kairos to justify investment in particular technologies.

== Bibliography ==
- Bazerman, Charles (1998). "The Production of Technology and the Production of Human Meaning". Journal of Business and Technical Communication. 12 (3): 381–387. doi:10.1177/1050651998012003006. S2CID 62551692.
- Bazerman, Charles. The Languages of Edison's Light. Inside Technology. Cambridge, Mass.: MIT Press, 1999.
- Benson, Thomas W; Hauser, Gerard A (2009). "Ideals, Superlatives, and the Decline of Hypocrisy". Quarterly Journal of Speech. 59 (1): 99–105. doi:10.1080/00335637309383157.
- Durack, Katherine T. "Gender, Technology, and the History of Technical Communication." Technical Communication Quarterly 6, no. 3. (1997): 249–260. https://doi.org/10.1207/s15427625tcq0603_2.
- Katz, Steven B (1992). "The ethic of expediency: Classical rhetoric, technology, and the Holocaust". College English. 54 (3): 255–275. doi:10.2307/378062. JSTOR 378062.
- Lynch, John A. and William J. Kinsella. "The Rhetoric of Technology as a Rhetorical Technology." Poroi 9, Iss. 1 (2013): Article 13. http://dx.doi.org/10.13008/2151-2957.1152.
- Miller, Carolyn. "Technology as a Form of Consciousness: A Study of Contemporary Ethos." Central States Speech Journal 29, no. 4 (1978): 228–236. https://doi.org/10.1080/10510977809367983.
- Miller, Carolyn R (1994). "Opportunity, Opportunism, and Progress: Kairos in the Rhetoric of Technology". Argumentation. 8 (1): 81–96. doi:10.1007/bf00710705. S2CID 144819973.
- Miller, Carolyn. "Expertise and Agency: Transformations of Ethos in Human-Computer Interaction." In The Ethos of Rhetoric. Edited by Michael J. Hyde, 197–218. Columbia: University of South Carolina Press, 2004.
- Packer, Jeremy, and Stephen B. Crofts Wiley. "Introduction: The Materiality of Communication." In Communication Matters: Materialist Approaches to Media, Mobility and Networks. Edited by Jeremy Packer and Stephen B. Crofts Wiley, 3–16. New York: Routledge, 2012.
- Wallace, Karl Richards, Speech Communication Association, and National Conference on Rhetoric National Conference on Rhetoric (1970 : St. Charles, Ill.). The Prospect of Rhetoric: Report of the National Developmental Project, Sponsored by Speech Communication Association. Edited by Lloyd F Bitzer and Edwin Black. Prentice-Hall Speech Communication Series. Englewood Cliffs, N.J: Prentice-Hall, 1971.
- Winner, Langdon. "Do Artifacts Have Politics?" Daedalus, 109, no. 1, Modern Technology: Problem or Opportunity? (Winter, 1980): 121-136
