= Global rhetorical studies =

Academic field

Global rhetorical studies, also known as comparative world rhetorics, is an interdisciplinary field examining rhetoric and persuasive practices across diverse cultures, languages, historical periods, and geopolitical contexts. It seeks to move beyond the traditional Euro-American rhetorical canon, focusing instead on a pluralistic, comparative, and often decolonial orientation to understanding how different societies conceptualize and engage in rhetorical activity.

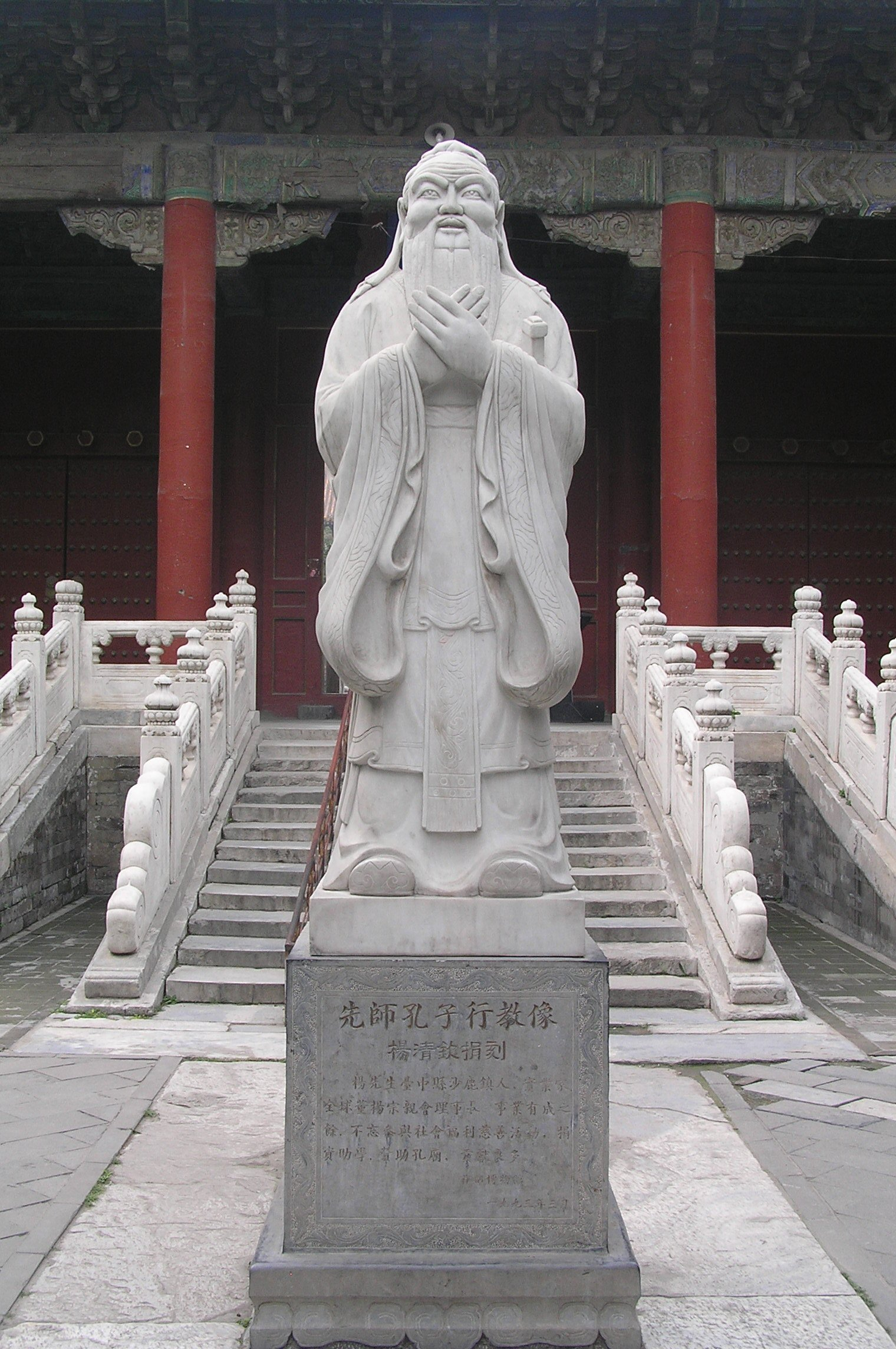
Confucianism has a major impact in classical Chinese rhetoric studies, noticeably with the idea of virtue.

The study originates from the comparative analysis of different rhetorical practices, noticeably rhetoric employed in non-Western powers like China and the Arab world. Prior to the development of global rhetorical studies, modern rhetoric scholars primarily focus the research on traditional, Western rhetoric, namely the practices from Ancient Greek literature and their counterpart from Ancient Rome. While studies on non-Western rhetoric begin to emerge in mid-20th century, they are widely considered as a separate academic topic.

By re-examining and empowering marginalized rhetoric practices, global rhetorical studies introduce Interdisciplinarity toward the study of the diverse global culture, facilitating the understanding and communication between different nationalities and contexts while offering a more equal perspective.

== Scope ==
Global rhetorical studies encompasses comparative rhetoric, transnational and decolonial approaches, digital rhetoric in global contexts, feminist transnational rhetoric, and rhetoric of science and technology worldwide. A common objective of global rhetorical studies is to transcend dominant Western perspectives and recover marginalized rhetorical traditions.

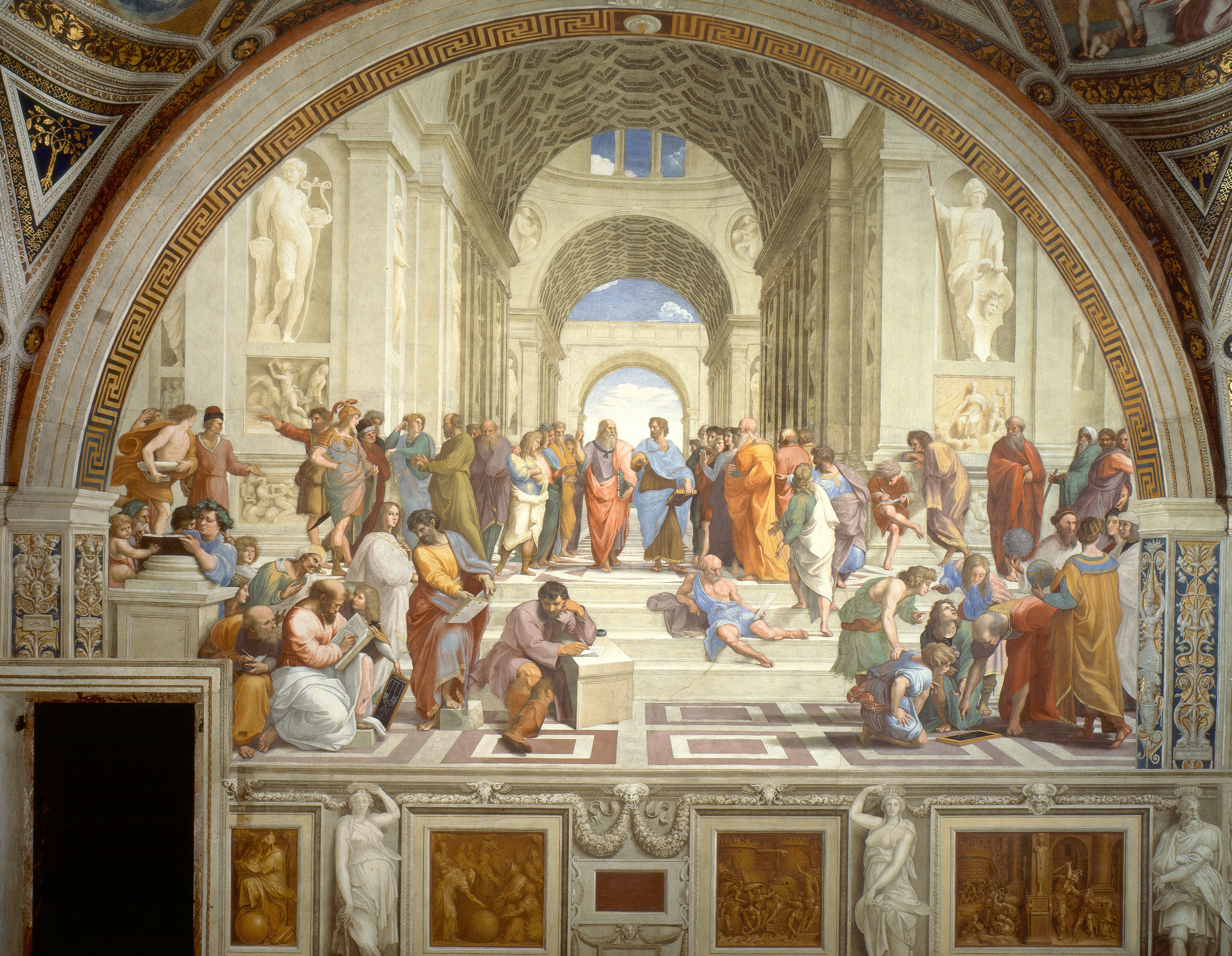
Ancient Greek rhetoric, like the one depicted in The School of Athens, is the primary focus of rhetoric studies prior to mid-20th century.

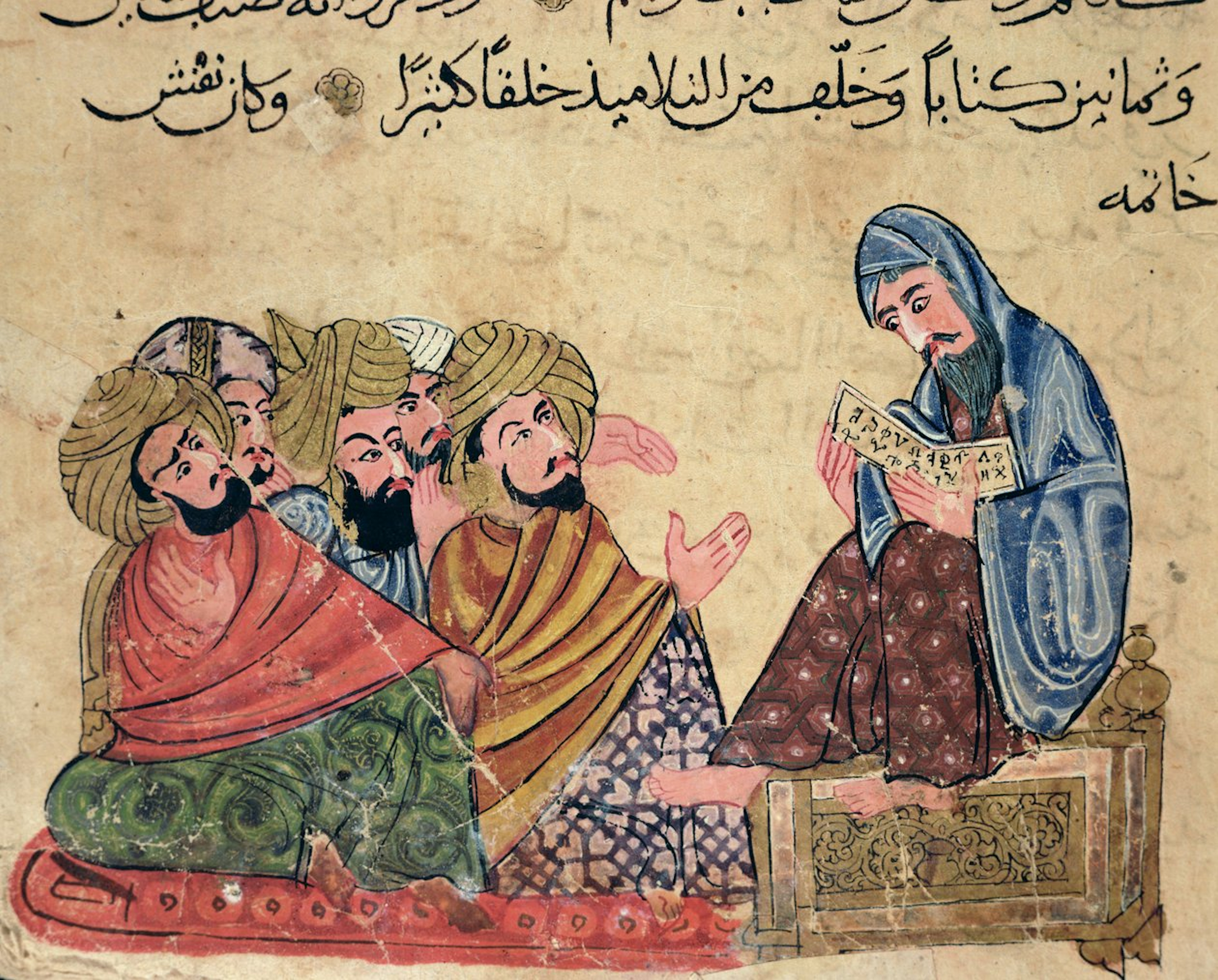
Islamic rhetorical studies are known for the combination of theological and social contexts.

== History ==
Global rhetorical studies grew out of comparative rhetorical approaches such as Robert T. Oliver’s examination of ancient Indian and Chinese rhetoric in 1971 and George A. Kennedy’s cross-cultural surveys in 1998. Although both scholars would later be criticized for re-inscribing western paradigms and promoting east/west binaries through their comparative work across cultures, they are generally recognized as influential to the field's beginnings.
