= Lawrence J. Prelli =

Lawrence J. Prelli is Professor and Chair of the Communications Department at the University of New Hampshire. He is known for his book on rhetoric of science, A Rhetoric of Science: Inventing Scientific Discourse (1990), which was well-reviewed. and cited.

== Works ==
- A Rhetoric of Science: Inventing Scientific Discourse. University of South Carolina Press, 1989.
- (ed.) Rhetorics of Display. University of South Carolina Press, 2006.
