= Gerhard Blechinger =

German media theorist

Gerhard Blechinger (* 1964 in Erding, Upper Bavaria) is a German media theorist. Since October 2015 he has been Rector of the Salzburg University of Applied Sciences.

== Life ==
Blechinger studied art history, ethnology, aesthetics and design theory in Munich and Wuppertal. He completed his master's degree at LMU Munich in 1989 with a thesis on the relationship between architecture and philosophy. In 1996, he received his doctorate at the University of Wuppertal near Bazon Brock with a thesis on the French philosopher Jacques Derrida. His work was published by Passages publisher Wien in 1997 under the title "Apophatik und Politik".

At the beginning of the 1990s, Gerhard Blechinger recognized the increasing influence that rapidly developing electronic media would have on many areas of life. In addition to his work on his doctorate, he also ran an agency at the time that dealt with first-generation media products. In 1997, Heinrich Klotz, founder of the Centre for Art and Media Technology (ZKM), brought him to Karlsruhe as a representative for Expo 2000. In 1998, he became deputy director of the new media museum under Hans-Peter Schwarz and at the same time head of Medialab. Blechinger concentrated on expanding media production and research. The first prototypes for Web 3.0 applications were created in Blechingers Medialab at the end of the nineties.

Following Hans-Peter Schwarz's appointment as Rector of the Hochschule für Gestaltung und Kunst Zürich (HGKZ), Blechinger followed him in 2000 as Vice Rector for Research, Development, Services and Technology Transfer. His task was to orient research in the field of design to the new technological possibilities and to advance the digitisation of the university. At the same time, Blechinger was also head of the IT department at the university and increased the technology budget by a factor of 100 during his seven years of activity. At times, the Zurich University of Art and Design raised up to 80% of Swiss research funds for universities of applied sciences.

In 2004, Blechinger founded the "TRACE" research group together with the philosopher Heiner Mühlmann and Thomas Grunwald (linguist, neuroscientist and medical director of the Swiss Epilepsy Centre). The acronym "TRACE" means "Transmission in Rhetorics, Arts and Cultural Evolution" In close cooperation with the founding president Yun Jeduk († 2012) and in cooperation with several colleges and universities in Germany (Technical University of Munich, RWTH Aachen University, Filmhochschule Babelsberg), Blechinger was involved in the founding of the "Korean German Institute of Technology" from 2003 in a leading position. Horst Teltschik was the founding director of the institute. Blechinger received a professorship for media at KGIT 2007.

In 2007, Blechinger founded the Institute for Design and Technology at the Zurich University of the Arts (ZHdK) and cooperated with technology and media partners such as Vodafone Pilot Development, Swisscom, Lucent, Alcatel, Pro7 and Ars Electronica.

After leaving Switzerland in 2010, Blechinger and Thomas Langhanki founded the company "Experimental Game" in Berlin, where he was a member of the management during the founding phase. At the same time, he was a lecturer in media theory at the Macromedia University in Munich. In 2011, Blechinger became head of the Multimedia Art course at Salzburg University of Applied Sciences, specialising in Film, Animation, Media Design, Audio and Management and Producing. The "CHE Ranking", renowned in German-speaking countries, named Multimedia-Art the best course of studies in Austria in 2014.

Also in 2014, the Salzburg Urstein Institute (SUI), which serves as the sponsoring company of the Berlin School of Sustainable Futures, University of Applied Sciences gGmbH, was founded by the Salzburg Urstein Institute (SUI). The state recognition as a private university pursuant to Section 123 of the Act on Higher Education in the State of Berlin (BerlHG) took place on 1 June 2018. The BSSF offers four Master's programmes that close an existing gap in the higher education landscape because they place sustainability, media, culture and society in the context of globalisation developments and digitisation.

Blechinger has been Academic Director of the conference format futur.io since 2016 and a member of the European Academy of Sciences and Arts Salzburg in the technology class since 2017; since 2018 he has been a member of the board of the Berlin School of Creative Leadership Foundation. In April 2019 he was re-elected for a second term from October 2019. From 2020 to 2021, Blechinger is the regular chair of the Salzburg University Conference.

== Fonts (selection) ==
- A Short History of Moonshots, in: Harald Neidhardt, Moonshots for Europe, future.io, Berlin 2019
- Publisher of the book series "Transmissions in Rhetorics, Art and Cultural Evolution", (TRACE) Fink Verlag since 2016
- The Idea and Death, in: Festschrift Klaus Dieter Müller, Potsdam Babelsberg HFF, 2011
- Brain Electrical Response to High and Low Architecture, Ilan Oppenheim, Heiner Mühlmann, Gerhard Blechinger, Ian W. Mothersill, Peter Hilfiger, Henric Jokeit, Martin Kurthen, Günter Krämer and Thomas Grunwald, in: Clinical EEG and Neuroscience, Phoenix Arizona, USA 2009
- Editor of the book series "Transmissions in Rhetorics, Art and Cultural Evolution", (TRACE) Vienna and New York 2004 - 2008 What comes after "Song for C". Catalog Ars Electronica, Linz 2006
- The Renaissance of Meta-narrative. On the relationship between art and technology as paragons in: Hans-Peter Schwarz (Ed.), Zurich Yearbook of the Arts, Zurich 2004
- Art and the ideology of suffering in: Cultural Policy 9/98
- Apophatic and Politics, On a Deconstruction of the Rhetorical by Jacques Derrida, Passages publisher, Vienna 1997

== Presentations (selection) ==
- High-Tech and the R/evolution of Art, Friedrichshafen, Zeppelin University, 2019
- Art and Innovation, Red Bull Academy, Lisbon 2019
- Heiner Mühlmann as political philosopher, Berlin Heiner Mühlmann for the 80th birthday 2019
- War, lecture Series at the Salzburg University of Applied Sciences 2017
- Insights on how to Manage Expert Systems and how to better leverage them, Startup Executive Round Table, Salzburg 2017
- Suh Yongsun as political painter in Korea, Stifterverband für die Deutsche Wissenschaft, Wissenschaftszentrum DAAD Bonn 2014
- Neuro Research, Media, Innovation, Potsdam 2013
- Inspiration and Rhetoric, subnet; Castle Leopoldskron Salzburg 2012
- Where's the Cash? New value chains in the gaming industry. Berlin 2012
- Innovative Zurich. An R&D Status Quo & Outlook, Zurich 2005
- Mobile Application Design, Boston 2005
- MPEG 7 and the Poetry of the Gesture, San Marino 2000
- New Tendencies in Media Art, Berkeley CA 1999 · Wireless Art and Mixed Reality, Lisbon 1998
