= Bazerman =

Bazerman is a surname. Notable people with the surname include:

- Charles Bazerman (born 1945), American educator and scholar
- Max H. Bazerman (born 1955), American academic
