= Jeanne Fahnestock =

American academic, argumentation scholar

Jeanne Fahnestock is a rhetorician of science and stylistics, argumentation scholar, translator, professor emeritus in English at the University of Maryland, College Park (1982–2012), and Fellow of the Rhetoric Society of America. Her books include Rhetorical Figures in Science, Rhetorical Style: The Uses of Language in Persuasion, three editions of A Rhetoric of Argument with Marie Secor, with whom she also edited the Readings in Argument collection, The Routledge Handbook of Language and Persuasion, edited with Randy Allen Harris, and the translation of Philip Melanchthon's sixteenth-century Erotemata Dialectices [The Dialectical Questions].

== Figural logic ==
Fahnestock's work in what she calls figural logic marks her most influential contributions to rhetoric and argumentation studies. Building on the insights of Chaïm Perelman and Lucie Olbrechts-Tyteca in The New Rhetoric, figural logic is a programme of argument critique anchored in the conceptual proximity of some rhetorical figures with some of Aristotle's topoi and based on the claim that some rhetorical figures epitomize lines of reason. The claim is uncontroversial for metaphor and simile, which epitomize argument from analogy, but Fahnestock puts those figures completely aside, arguing in a polemical section of Rhetorical Figures in Science entitled, "The Dominance of Metaphor," that:

the fixation on metaphor as a stimulus in scientific creativity, as a device in scientific argument or pedagogy ... and, finally, as an explanatory resource for textual scholars overemphasizes the role of analogy in human reasoning and begs the question of whether all or even most scientific cases can be 'explained' by a core metaphor. What about the gas laws, superconductivity, electromagnetic induction, the periodic table, the positron, or retroviruses?

As Alan G. Gross notes in an influential review of the book, figural logic "undermines our comfortable sense that, aside from metaphor, the figures can be safely ignored" by rhetoric and argumentation theorists. Fahnestock's achievement is not so much with the polemic (the fixation with metaphor has not abated) but, as Gross shows, in the broadened understanding she brings to figural argumentation. Gross's appreciation was widely shared in book's reception, though they also reveal some discontent that Fahnestock is too cautious, that she fails to see the cognitive dimensions of her work, a complaint to which she later responded, and its epistemological implications, and that it neglects the crucial political and ideological aspects of all scientific research.

Fahnestock's explication of the role other rhetorical figures play in argumentation includes antithesis (opposing predications, as in the stronger leads, the weaker follows) and incrementum (a series of terms in a semantic incline, as in bronze, silver, and gold). Antithesis, in particular, is very prominent in argumentation. Opposing parties often frame each other in extreme terms, perhaps most obviously in the political divisions labelled with the antonyms left and right. The figure's best known role in science is perhaps with Charles Darwin's Principle of Antithesis in The Expression of the Emotions in Man and Animals, which suggests that many behavioural expressions take the form they do because they are conceptually opposed. "[W]hen a directly opposite state of mind is induced," Darwin writes, "there is a strong and involuntary tendency to the performance of movements of a directly opposite nature." When we are happy, we smile: our eyes open wide, our mouth turns up. When we are angry, we frown: our eyes narrow, our brows furrow, our mouth turns down. When a dog is aggressive, it is fully upright, tail extended. When it is submissive, it crouches, tail between its legs.

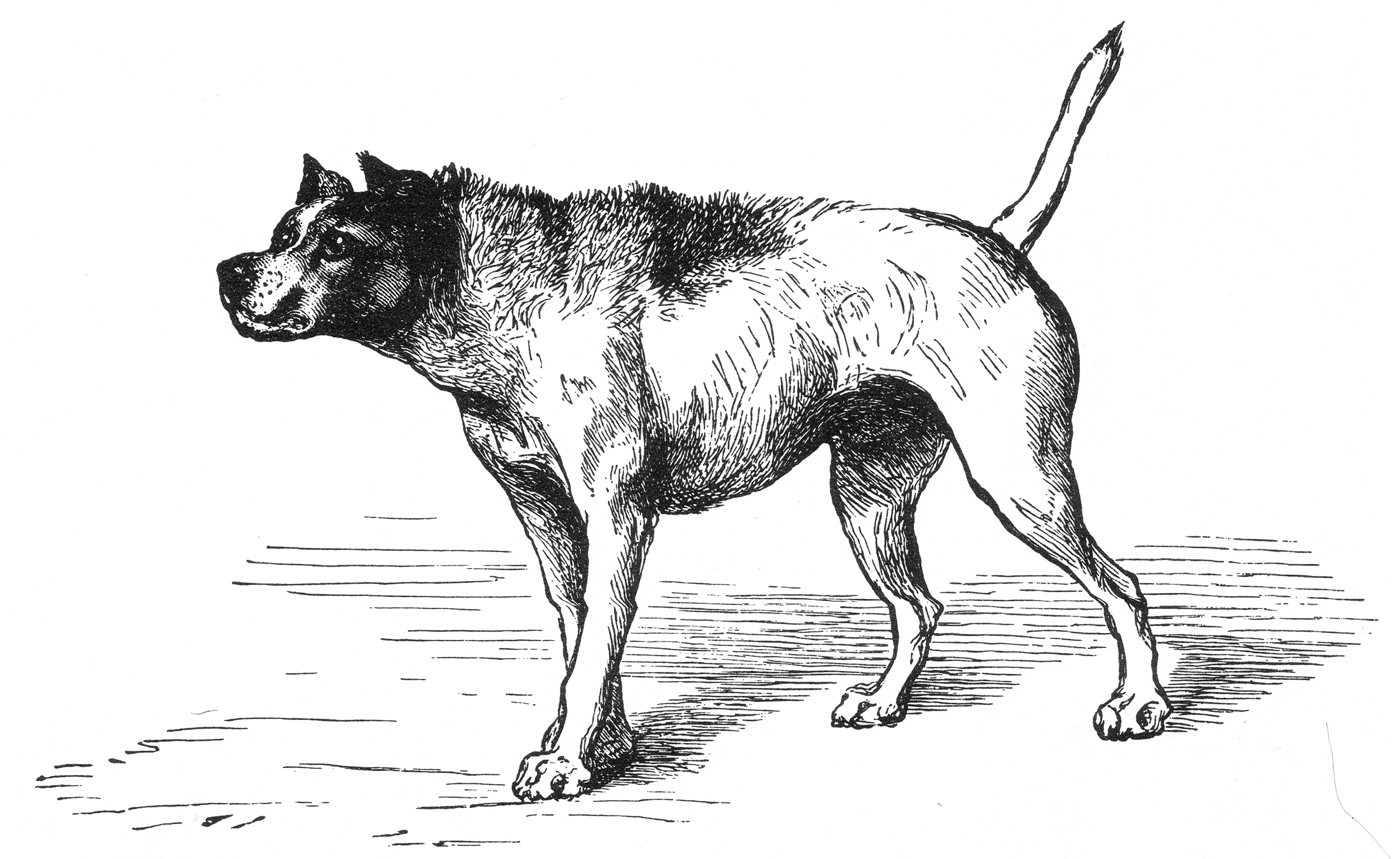
"Dog approaching another dog with hostile intentions."

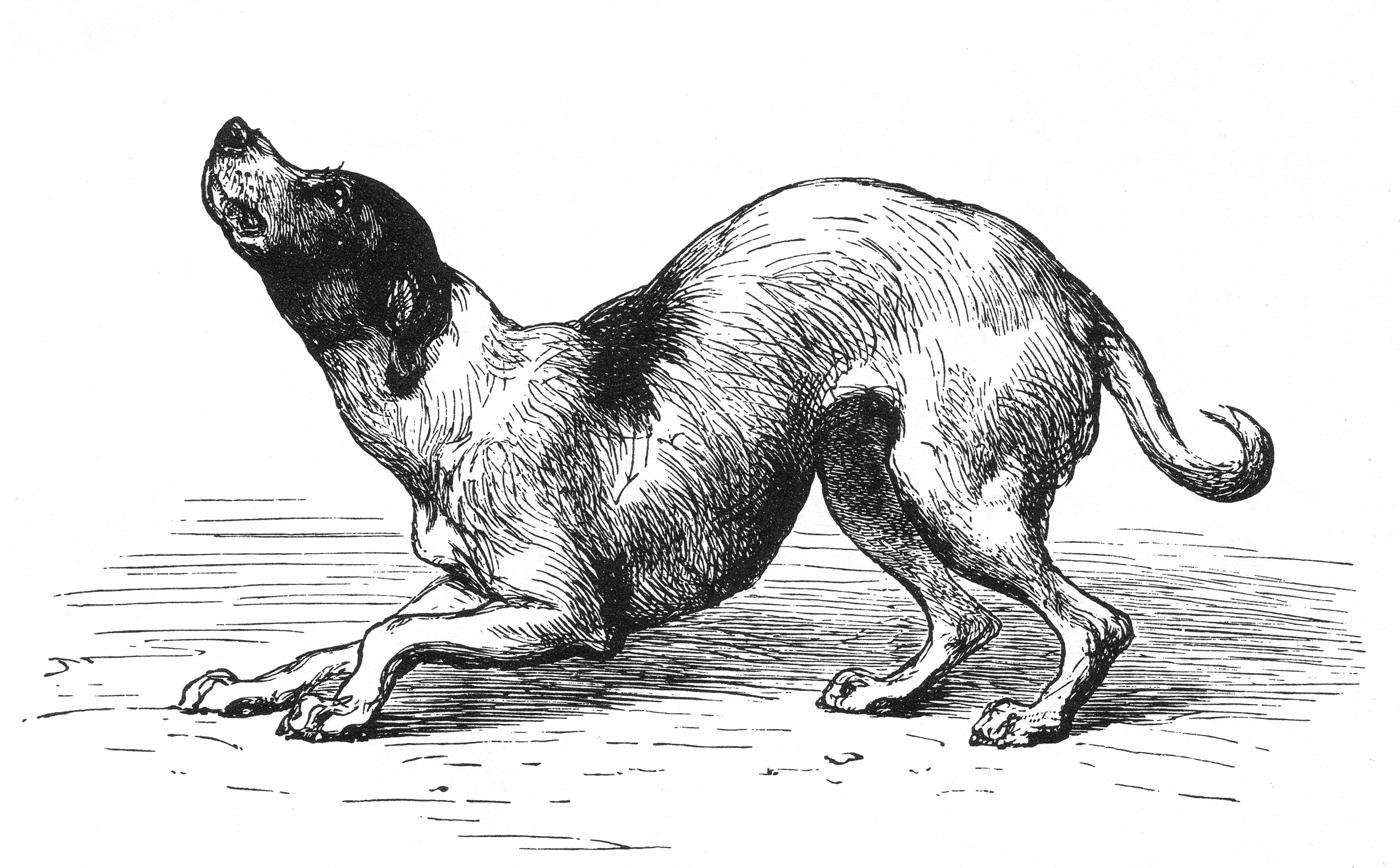
"The same in a humble and affectionate frame of mind"

Incrementum is also familiar in the argumentation of evolutionary theory, and argumentation adjacent to evolutionary theory, since differences within and between species manifest in clines of size, specialization, characteristics of display, and so on. Such differences are also evident in the fossil record, charting lines of descent. Figural logic, like argumentation generally, can also be visual, as Fahnestock repeatedly demonstrates. She cites the visually oppositional imagery Darwin uses in his argument for the Principle of Antithesis, like the familiar engravings of the same dog in an aggressive and a submissive posture. She illustrates an incremental visual argument with series of images showing a size cline from eohippus to the modern horse. The notorious March of Progress imagery is another clear example of the figural logic of incrementum, used ideologically.

Antithesis and incrementum are semantic figures ("tropes"), like metaphor and simile, so their role in epitomizing conceptual relations is not an unexpected extension of figural reasoning. But Fahnestock also analyzes several material rhetorical figures ("schemes") that are mostly unfamiliar outside of academic rhetoric studies. Antimetabole (a type of chiasmus), for instance, is the inverse repetition of words, frequently mediated by a common term, as in all for one and one for all, made famous by Alexandre Dumas's The Three Musketeers. Fahnestock demonstrates that this figure epitomizes an argumentation scheme of reciprocity. All for one and one for all expresses reciprocal obligation. The group is obliged to defend and uphold the interests of the individual, who is in turn equally obliged defend and uphold the interests of the group. Fahnestock's milieu is scientific argumentation, and she shows how Isaac Newton encodes his third law of motion, expressing the reciprocal nature of forces between interacting bodies, even if one of them appears inert, with the following antimetabole:

"Si equus lapidem funi allegatum trahit, retrahetur etiam & equus aequaliter in lapidem: nam funis utrinq; distentus eodem relaxandi se conatu urgebit Equum versus lapidem, ac lapidem versus equum." ("If a horse draws a stone tied to a rope, the horse (if I may so say) will be equally drawn back towards the stone: for the distended rope, by the same endeavour to relax or unbend itself, will draw the horse as much towards the stone as it does the stone towards the horse.")

The English translation loosens the antimetabole somewhat from the tighter Latin version, Equum versus lapidem, ac lapidem versus equum, '[drawing] the horse towards the stone and the stone towards the horse.' But they both express the reciprocal expenditure of forces directly in the figurative syntactico-lexical structure of the expression: "the changing syntactic order changes the grammatical relation of the two terms ... and makes, overall, reciprocal claims ... about their causal connection to each other." While she does not explicitly make the connection, this argumentation uses antimetabole perfectly to realize Charles Sanders Peirce's notion of diagrammatic iconicity. Other schemes Fahnestock employs to demonstrate her epitome-of-argument-lines claim include the morpholexical figure, polyptoton (repetition of the same lexical stem with different affixes, as in hate the sin, love the sinner), which is extraordinarily common in scientific taxonomy (sulfite, sulfate; phosphite, phosphate; nitrite, nitrate), and gradatio (a series of repetitions over clausal boundaries, as in for want of a nail, the shoe was lost; for want of a shoe, the horse was lost; for want of a horse, the rider was lost...), exemplified in this passage from Richard Feynman:

[A]ll the efforts of intellectual kinds, are an endeavour to see the connections of the hierarchies, to connect beauty to history, to connect history to man's psychology, man's psychology to the working of the brain, the brain to the neural impulse, the neural impulse to the chemistry, and so forth, up and down, both ways.

Beyond Fahnestock's own work, figural logic has been promoted most vigorously in the work of philosopher Christopher Tindale's rhetorical argumentation framework. But its more diffuse influence is considerable. See also Christian Plantin's closely resembling proposals, which similarly builds on Perelman and Olbrechts-Tyteca's New Rhetoric and leverages Aristotelian topoi, while somehow avoiding mention of Fahnestock.

Computational linguistics, especially in the subfield of argument mining, has also adopted a version of figural logic. Lawrence et al. call Fahnestock's work "a major advance" because of its "compelling case for the conception of rhetorical figures of speech [...] as couplings of linguistic form and function." What makes figural logic so promising for argument mining is the relative ease of detecting the form of figures like antithesis, antimetabole, and epanaphora, compared to metaphor, and the coupled function is a key to the argument's inferential structure. Mark Turner has also argued that the form/function coupling of Fahnestock's figural logic is highly compatible with the linguistic theory of construction grammar.

== Honors and awards ==
Fahnestock was a Marshall Scholar in 1967. Other honors include a fellowship with the Rhetoric Society of America, an Excellence in Teaching Award from the University of Maryland (2012), a Distinguished Scholarship Award for Lifetime Achievement from the International Society for the Study of Argumentation (2010), and the Outstanding Administrator Award from the Maryland Association of Higher Education (1994).
