= Heiner Mühlmann =

German philosopher (born 1938)

Heiner Mühlmann (born 1938) is a German philosopher.

== Biography ==
Heiner Mühlmann was born in Regensburg in 1938. He studied art history and philosophy in Germany, France and Italy before he received his doctorate in 1981 with a dissertation on the Renaissance humanist Leon Battista Alberti. He wrote his habilitation thesis about catastrophe theory, graph theory and architecture at the University of Wuppertal where he then became a professor.

His work has focused on cultural theory. He is a co-founder of the interdisciplinary research project TRACE which uses neuroanthropology to study memory.

Mühlmann's 1996 book The Nature of Cultures received considerable attention in the fields of systems theory, polemology, mediology and neurorhetorics upon its publication. In it, he presents what he calls the Maximal-Stress-Cooperation (MSC) model, which attempts to explain the relationship between stress and the birth of cultural groups.

== Selected works ==
=== Published in English ===
- The Nature of Cultures: A Blueprint for a Theory of Culture Genetics. Vienna; New York: Springer. 1996. ISBN 978-3-211-82800-7
- MSC: Maximal Stress Cooperation: The Driving Force of Cultures. Vienna; New York: Springer. 2005. ISBN 978-3-211-25678-7
