= Worried well =

Healthy people concerned about illness

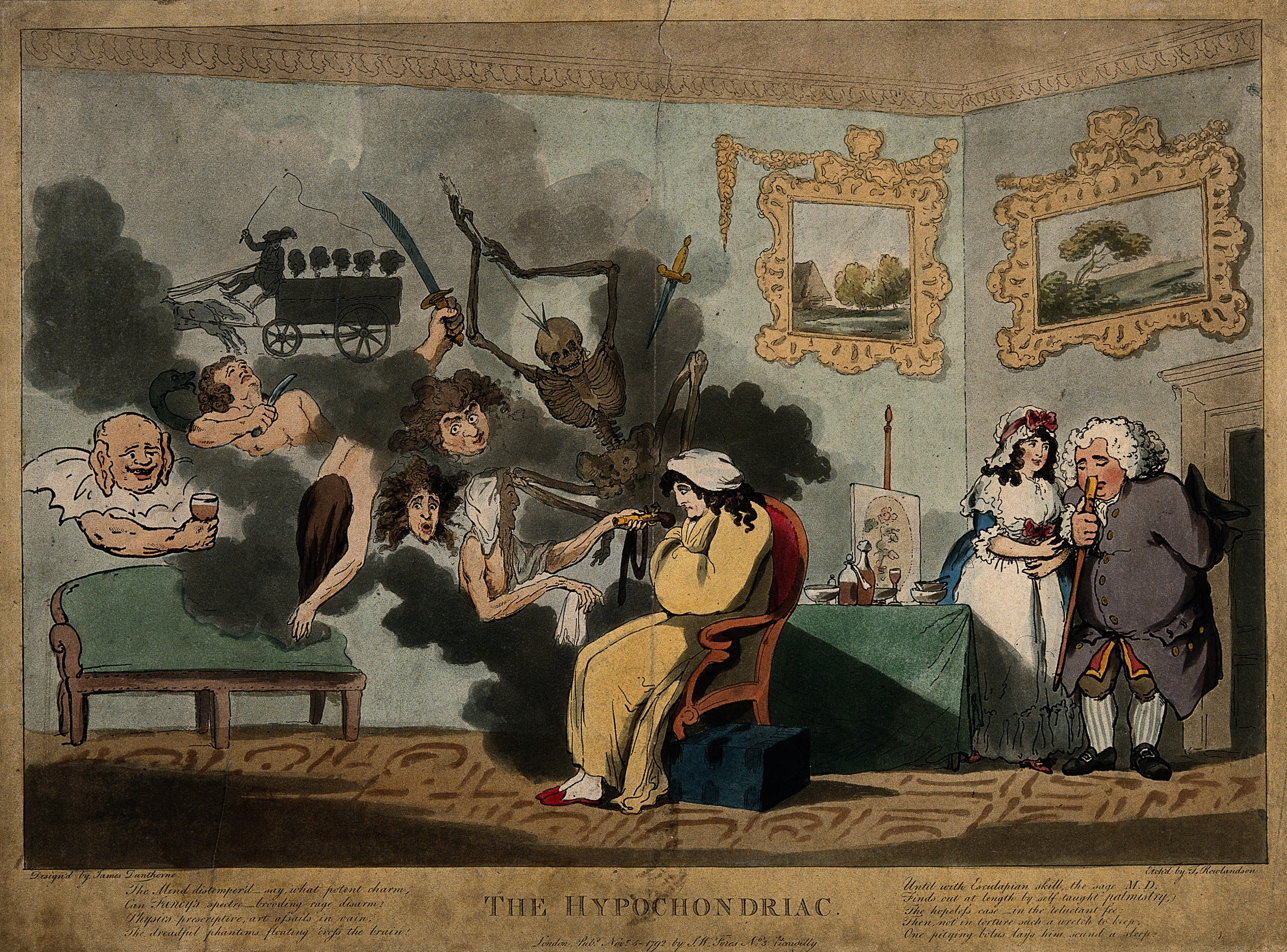
The Hypochondriac, colored etching by Thomas Rowlandson, 1788

The worried well is a term that describes persons who are in relatively good health but believe themselves to be ill or likely to get an illness based on a current circumstance. As a collective noun, the term is typically used for groups of patients, not clearly defined, who are perceived to be using health services inappropriately or disproportionately.

The phenomenon is also known as worried well syndrome. The worried well are within ICD-10 code Z71.1—"Person with feared complaint in whom no diagnosis is made."

They are distinct from those suffering from hypochondriasis (health anxiety), whose health concerns are chronic and rise to the level of a psychiatric condition; in contrast, anxiety experienced by worried well patients is usually caused by a specific event.

== Etymology ==
The term worried well, according to the Oxford English Dictionary, was first used in a 1970 Scientific American article by physician Sidney Garfield, who described a "variable entry mix into medical care consisting of (1) the well, (2) the ‘worried well’, (3) the ‘early sick’ and (4) the sick."

In 1997, The Times wrote that "Mental health experts...have...nicknamed them the ‘worried well’—too disturbed to sail through life's challenges but too well to warrant medical treatment."

== Causes, issues, and examples ==
Reasons for the presentation of worried-well syndrome may vary. The anxiety that the worried-well experience is likely related to the information to which people are regularly exposed and the uncertainties that arise as result. Any event, be it factual or fictional, can lead to anxiety in worried-well patients.

In 1976, Sidney Garfield and others explained in the New England Journal of Medicine how the "worried well" posed challenges in delivering healthcare.

In the 1980s, government campaigns following the arrival of AIDS in the United Kingdom provided genitourinary clinics with drastic increases in the amount of patients wanting to get tested for HIV. However, those testing positive for HIV hardly rose at all; evidently, many of those who tested negative had little to no risk for infection anyway, but had disproportionate anxiety about possibly contracting the virus.

In 2001, following the news of Anthrax being discovered at the Brentwood mail facility in Washington, DC, the George Washington University Hospital received hundreds of walk-ins. Also that year, during a U.S. congressional hearing on "risk communication," Representative Chris Shays stated that, "Driven by fear alone, hordes of the 'worried well' could overwhelm emergency rooms and clinics, impeding diagnosis and treatment of the genuinely ill."

In 2014, following the death of a patient from Ebola in Texas, visits to emergency departments in Metropolitan Dallas–Fort Worth increased by over 1000 per day.

In 2017, research by Imperial College London discovered that the worried well in the UK may be costing £56,000,000 (US$72,000,000) to the National Health Service because of unnecessary appointments with general practitioners. They estimated that up to 1 in 5 people attending medical clinics had abnormal health anxiety, which has possibly been worsened with the increase in cyberchondria—people who have researched their symptoms online and use it as evidence that they have a life-threatening disease.

The idea has also been discussed in relation to the COVID-19 pandemic, as there has been concern that 'worried-well' patients could place significant strain on healthcare resources. For instance, experiencing overwhelming numbers of residents concerned about their health, some health officials have found it necessary to establish criteria under which residents could get tested to preserve supply. As result, when Hayward, California, for example, offered free COVID-19 testing, ultimately 9 out of 10 walk-in residents and 4 out of 5 drive-in residents were denied tests on the opening day (24 March 2020).

Prevalence of the 'worried-well' may also come as a side-effect of the pandemic, as suggested by Pamela Aaltonen—professor emerita of nursing in Purdue University's College of Health and Human Sciences:

One concern during a pandemic is that it is not easy, and sometimes even risky, to seek in-person health care. Conversations individuals might typically be having with one’s health care providers are not occurring and clarity of the meaning of symptoms are left undiscussed. The use of telemedicine is filling this gap in some communities.

== Criticism ==
The negative connotations associated with the perceived feelings of inappropriate use of health services has led some to advocate for the term to not be used, arguing that it reflects the idea of there being a 'deserving' and 'undeserving' class of people. In fact, labelling patients with the term can lead to dismissing those who may:

- present with a worrying symptom that later turns out to have no worrying cause;
- have a real physical illness; or
- have severe health anxiety and therefore a mental illness requiring medical treatment.

In his February 2020 paper in the British Journal of General Practice, general practitioner Denis Pereira Gray states:

For doctors, it is wrong to imply that worry in patients does not matter and is a lesser symptom than others. The implication of the phrase is that pathologically based disease is more important than emotionally based disease, so the phrase reflects old-fashioned ideas about mental health being less important than physical health.

== See also ==
- Hypochondriasis
- Cyberchondria
- Neurosis
