= Technical Communication Quarterly =

- Discipline: Technical writing
- Language: English
- Edited by: Rebecca Walton

Publication details
- History: 1992-present
- Publisher: Routledge on behalf of the Association of Teachers of Technical Writing
- Frequency: Quarterly

Standard abbreviations
- ISO 4: Tech. Commun. Q.

Indexing
- CODEN: TCQEAB
- ISSN: 1057-2252 (print); 1542-7625 (web)
- LCCN: 92642719
- OCLC no.: 795955005

Links
- Journal homepage; Online access; Online archive

Technical Communication Quarterly is a quarterly peer-reviewed academic journal that covers technical communication in a variety of fields (business, science, and technology, among others). It combines both theoretical and practical perspectives in its research articles. The journal was established in 1992 and is published by Taylor & Francis on behalf of the Association of Teachers of Technical Writing (ATTW). The editor-in-chief is Rebecca Walton (Utah State University). Previous editors have been Donald Cunningham (founding editor), Victoria Mikelonis, Mary Lay, Billie Wahlstrom, Charlotte Thralls, Mark Zachry, Amy Koerber, and Donna Kain.

== Abstracting and Indexing ==
The journal is abstracted and indexed in ABI/Inform, Academic Search Premier, MLA International Bibliography, PsycINFO/Psychological Abstracts, and Scopus.
