= Journal of Business and Technical Communication =

- Discipline: Business, communication
- Language: English
- Edited by: Jo Mackiewicz

Publication details
- Former names: Iowa State Journal of Business and Technical Communication
- History: 1987-present
- Publisher: SAGE Publishing (United States)
- Frequency: Quarterly
- Impact factor: 0.900 (2018)

Standard abbreviations
- ISO 4: J. Bus. Tech. Commun.

Indexing
- CODEN: JBTCE9
- ISSN: 1050-6519 (print); 1552-4574 (web)
- LCCN: 2004214326
- OCLC no.: 18973702

Links
- Journal homepage; Online access; Online archive

The Journal of Business and Technical Communication is a quarterly peer-reviewed academic journal that focuses on communication best practices, problems, and trends in business and academic venues. The journal was established in 1987 and is published by SAGE Publishing. The editor-in-chief is Jo Mackiewicz (Iowa State University) Article types include research articles, commentaries, book and software reviews, and comments and responses.

== Abstracting and indexing ==
The journal is abstracted and indexed in Scopus, EBSCO databases, ERIC, ProQuest databases, and the Social Sciences Citation Index. According to the Journal Citation Reports, its 2018 impact factor is 0.900, ranking it 77th out of 88 journals in the category "Communication" and 129th out of 147 journals in the category "Business". The journal has a CiteScore of 4.6 as of 2022.
