= Charles Bazerman =

American educator and scholar

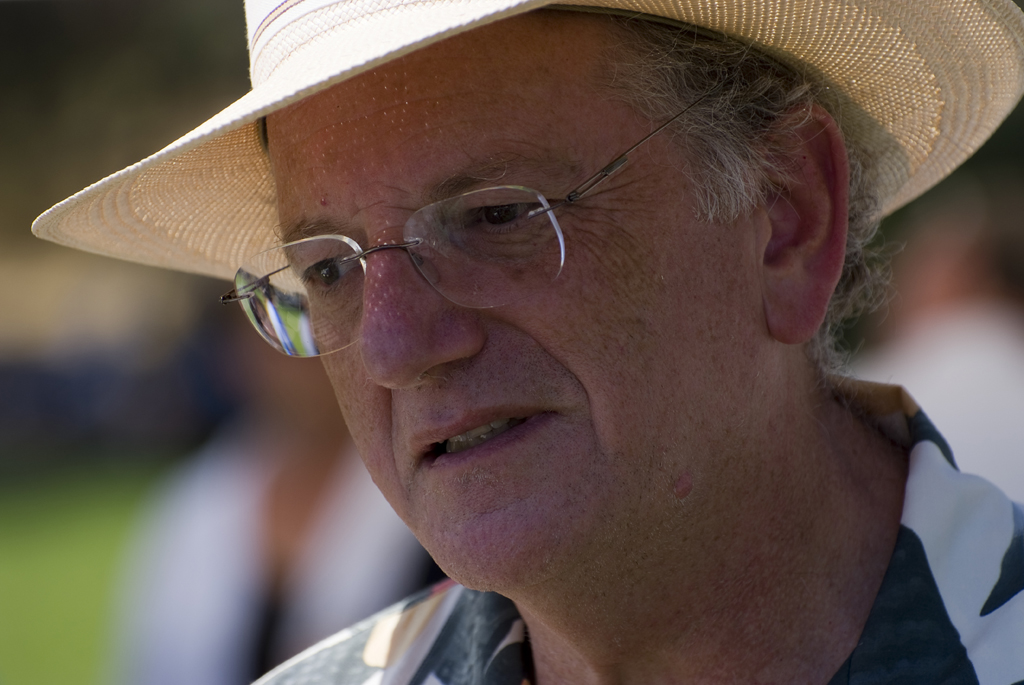
- Born: June 30, 1945 (age 81); New York, United States
- Education: B.A. Cornell University, Ph.D. Brandeis University
- Spouse: Shirley Geok-lin Lim
- Awards: 2018 James R. Squire Award from the National Council of Teachers of English; 2020 Conference on College Composition and Communication Exemplar Award.
- Scientific career
- Fields: Genre studies, rhetoric of science, development of writing abilities
- Workplaces: University of California, Santa Barbara
- Doctoral advisor: J.V. Cunningham

Charles Bazerman (born 1945) is an American educator and scholar. He has contributed significantly to the establishment of writings as a research fielder, evidenced by the collection of essays written by international scholars in Writing as A Human Activity: Implications and Applications of the Work of Charles Bazerman. Best known for his work on genre studies and the rhetoric of science, he is a Professor of Education at the University of California, Santa Barbara, where he served as Chair of the Program in Education for eight years. He served as Chair of the Conference on College Composition and Communication, delivering the 2009 CCCC Chair's Address, "The Wonders of Writing," in San Francisco, California.

He is the author of over 18 books, including Shaping Written Knowledge, Constructing Experiences, The Languages of Edison’s Light, A Theory of Literate Action, and a Rhetoric of Literate Action. He also edited over 20 volumes, including Textual Dynamics of the Profession, Writing Selves/Writing Societies, What Writing Does and How it Does It, as well as the Handbook of Research on Writing and the two series Rhetoric, Knowledge and Society and Reference Guides to Rhetoric and Composition. He also wrote textbooks supporting the integration of reading and writing that have appeared in over 30 editions and versions including The informed writer: Using sources in the disciplines, The Informed Reader, and the English Skills Handbook.

== Academic career ==
Bazerman did his undergraduate work at Cornell University (B.A. 1967), and earned a Ph.D. in English and American Literature at Brandeis University in 1971. In 2016 the Argentinian National Universities of Cordoba, Entre Ríos, Río Cuarto, and Villa María granted him a Doctor Honoris Causa. He has taught at Baruch College, City University of New York from 1972 to 1990, becoming a full professor in 1985. He was professor of Literature, Communication and Culture at the Georgia Institute of Technology from 1990 to 1994.

In 1994 he joined the English faculty at the University of California, Santa Barbara (UCSB), and in 1997 he became a Professor of Education in the Gevirtz Graduate School of Education at the University of California, Santa Barbara, where he also served as chair of the program in education from 2000 to 2006. He has also taught at Cornell University, the National University of Singapore, Universidade Federale de Pernambuco, University of the Lorraine (France), Masaryk University (Czech Republic), China University of Geosciences (Beijing), University of Porto (Portugal), and PS93K elementary school in Brooklyn. His work has been translated into Portuguese, Italian, French, Spanish, and Chinese.

His work has won numerous awards, including two lifetime achievement awards, the 2018 James R. Squire Award from the National Council of Teachers of English and the 2020 Conference on College Composition and Communication Exemplar Award.

== Writing across the curriculum and disciplinary writing ==
Bazerman, as an early advocate of Writing across the curriculum (WAC), sought to establish a research basis to understand a movement within contemporary composition studies that concerns itself with writing in classes outside of composition, literature, and other English courses. His 1981 analysis of research papers in the sciences, social sciences, and humanities identified differences in the way they represented the material studied, established a relationship with the disciplinary audiences, presented the author, and used the disciplinary literature.

In consequent publications, he studied such topics as the changing genres of disciplinary research articles, the development of reference and citation practices and the use of evidence in student learning and professional domains. With his students, he wrote a reference guide to Writing Across the Curriculum, which integrated studies of writing in different disciplines together with educational practices and programs.

== Genre and activity theory ==
Drawing on his various historical and empirical studies and the work of colleagues, Bazerman developed theories about genre and how they participated in and helped form activity systems, initially in his book Shaping Written Knowledge. He later elaborated theoretical ideas in several chapters on genre systems, typification and originality, concepts in activity, and the social origins of genres in letter writing. He fostered work of other scholars on activity through co-editing a number of volumes with David Russell. His two volumes of Literate Action provided a comprehensive view of his rhetorical theory and interdisciplinary sources.

To further investigate how consequential social actions engage multiple activity and genre systems in interaction, he examined how Thomas Edison and his colleagues needed to communicatively engage with multiple journalistic, financial, technical, legal, cultural, and corporate spheres in the course of inventing and producing central light and power. In a series of articles he also applied this reasoning to understand the rise of environmental knowledge, public and governmental engagement with the environment, and the politics of climate change legislation.

== Relation of Sociocultural factors to cognition and lifespan development of writing ==
While his work has centrally focused on the historical and social situatedness of writing, he has sought to understand how those sociocultural factors set the conditions for psychology processes, development of writing abilities and intellectual development. Through the study of historical examples, he has examined how the growing understanding of the communicative world of such innovative thinkers as Joseph Priestley and Adam Smith went hand in hand with their changing ways of writing. He consequently studied how writing and reading practices influenced growth of thinking in students.

The question of the development of individual writers within their social circumstances and their changing understanding of their communicative need and social circumstances resulted in a series of inquiries into the lifespan development of writing and the methodological difficulties of such a project; and his participation in collaborative groups to engage that inquiry.

In his research, Bazerman explains that Lifespan Writing development can be seen in changes across childhood, adulthood, and professional life. Personal circumstances like one's education and social environment are also seen to be key factors in writing development. He also emphasizes how this development is not linear.

== Leadership roles ==
Bazerman is a founding organizer of the Research Network Forum, a forum for early career scholars and graduate students that has been held annually since 1987 at the Conference on College Composition and Communication (CCCC), the Consortium of Doctoral Programs in Rhetoric and Composition, and the Rhetoricians for Peace. In 2011, Bazerman became the Inaugural Chair of the International Society of the Advancement of Writing Research, which holds conferences on writing research around the world.

== Bibliography ==
=== Primary works ===
- Shaping Written Knowledge: The Genre and Activity of the Experimental Article in Science (1988)
- Bazerman, Charles. "Reporting the Experiment: The Changing Account of Scientific Doings in the Philosophical Transactions of the Royal Society, 1665-1800." In Landmark Essays on Rhetoric of Science: Case Studies. Ed. Randy Allen Harris. Mahwah: Hermagoras Press, 1997.
- Constructing experience, SIU Press, 1994, ISBN 978-0-8093-1906-0
- The Languages of Edison's Light, MIT Press, 2002, ISBN 978-0-262-52326-4
- The informed writer: Using sources in the disciplines, Houghton Mifflin, 1995, ISBN 978-0-395-68723-9

=== Edited collections ===
- Bazerman, Charles, Joseph, Little, Lisa, Bethel, Teri, Chavkin, Danielle, Fouquette, & Janet, Garufis. (2005). Reference Guide to Writing Across the Curriculum. Parlor Press; The WAC Clearinghouse. https://wac.colostate.edu/books/referenceguides/bazerman-wac/Parlor Press LLC, 2005.
- Landmark essays on writing across the curriculum, Charles Bazerman, David R. Russell Eds. Routledge, 1994, ISBN 978-1-880393-09-3
- Charles Bazerman, Paul A. Prior, Ed, What writing does and how it does it: An introduction to analyzing texts and textual practices, Lawrence Erlbaum Associates, 2004, ISBN 978-0-8058-3806-0
