= Rhetoric of science =

Body of scholarly literature

Rhetoric of science is a body of scholarly literature exploring the notion of the practice of science as a rhetorical activity. It emerged after a number of similarly oriented topics of research and discussion during the late 20th century, including the sociology of scientific knowledge, history of science, and philosophy of science, but it is practiced most typically by rhetoricians in academic departments of English, speech, and communication.

== Overview ==
Rhetoric is best known as a discipline that studies the means and ends (i.e., methods and goals) of persuasion. Science, meanwhile, is typically considered to be the discovery and recording of knowledge about nature. A major contention of the rhetoric of science is that the practice of science itself is, to varying degrees, persuasive. The study of science from the viewpoint of rhetoric variously examines modes of inquiry, logic, argumentation, the ethos of scientific practitioners, the structures of scientific publications, and the character of scientific discourse and debates.

For instance, scientists must convince their community of scientists that their research is based on sound scientific method. In terms of rhetoric, the scientific method involves problem-solution topoi (the materials of discourse) that demonstrate observational and experimental competence (arrangement or order of discourse or method), and as a means of persuasion, offer explanatory and predictive power. Experimental competence is itself a persuasive topos. Rhetoric of science is a practice of suasion that is an outgrowth of some of the canons of rhetoric.

== History ==
Since its flourishing during the 1970s, rhetoric of science has contributed to a shift of opinions concerning science to include the claim that there is not any single scientific method, but rather a plurality of methods or styles.

The rhetoric of science has included various sub-topics, as indicated by these examples. John Angus Campbell has studied the works of Charles Darwin with the intention of showing Darwin's rhetorical manipulations and strategic use of the social beliefs of his time. Carolyn Miller has emphasized genres within technology and the influence of technology on genre change. Jeanne Fahnestock has identified the use of classical rhetoric in scientific reasoning and argument. Greg Myers has studied how scientific publications, grants, and other scientific texts are the result of social processes and the pragmatics of politeness in scientific discussions.

Charles Bazerman's examination of the evolution of the varieties of writing characterized as experimental report through the first century and a half of the Philosophical Transactions of the Royal Society, the formation of social roles and norms concerning the publication of this journal, the Physical Review since its founding in 1893, and the evolution of the Publication Manual of the American Psychological Association, along with scrutiny of works by Newton and Compton, and an analysis of the reading habits of physicists indicate the many social, organizational, ideological, political, theoretical, methodological, evidentiary, intertextual and intellectual factors that have influenced the character of writing and rhetoric. Bazerman's work has built upon these studies to consider the way knowledge is methodically produced and communicatively circulated in various activity systems. His work follows the lead of Ludwik Fleck on Thought Collectives and thought styles, structuration theory and phenomenology.

Other rhetoricians consider the rhetoric of science effectively beginning with Thomas Kuhn'sThe Structure of Scientific Revolutions (1962). Kuhn first examines "normal" science, that is, practices which he considered routine, patterned and accessible with a specific method of problem-solving. Normal science advances by building on past knowledge, through the accretion of further discoveries in a knowledge base. Kuhn then contrasts normal science with "revolutionary" science (new science marked by a paradigm shift in thought). When Kuhn began to teach Harvard undergraduates historical texts such as Aristotle's writings on motion, he examined case studies, and sought first to understand Aristotle in his own time, and then to locate his problems and solutions within a wider context of contemporary thought and actions. That is to say, Kuhn sought first to understand the traditions and established practices of science. In this instance, Michael Polanyi's influence on Kuhn becomes apparent; that is, his acknowledgement of the importance of inherited practices and rejection of absolute objectivity. Observing the changes in scientific thought and practices, Kuhn concluded that revolutionary changes happen through the defining notion of rhetoric: persuasion. The critical work of Herbert W. Simons – "Are Scientists Rhetors in Disguise?" in Rhetoric in Transition (1980) – and subsequent works show that Kuhn's Structure is fully rhetorical.

The work of Thomas Kuhn was extended by Richard Rorty (1979, 1989), and this work was to prove fruitful in defining the means and ends of rhetoric in scientific discourse (Jasinski "Intro" xvi). Rorty, who invented the phrase "rhetorical turn", was also interested in assessing periods of scientific stability and instability.

Another component of the shift in science that occurred during the past concerns the claim that there is no single scientific method, but rather a plurality of methods or styles. Paul Feyerabend in Against Method (1975) contends that science has found no "method that turns ideologically contaminated ideas into true and useful theories", in other words; no special method exists that can guarantee the success of science (302).

As evidenced by the early theory papers after Kuhn's seminal work, the idea that rhetoric is crucial to science became much discussed. Quarterly journals in speech and rhetoric included much discussion of topics such as inquiry, logic, argument fields, ethos of scientific practitioners, argumentation, scientific text, and the character of scientific discourse and debates. Philip Wander (1976) observed, for instance, the phenomenal penetration of science (public science) in modern life. He labelled the obligation of rhetoricians to investigate science's discourse "The Rhetoric of Science" (Harris "Knowing" 164).

As rhetoric of science began to flourish, discussion began of a number of topics, including:

- Epistemic rhetoric and the discourses on the nature of semantics, knowledge, and truth: One example is the Robert L. Scott's work on viewing rhetoric as epistemic (1967). By the 1990s, epistemic rhetoric was a point of contention in the writing of Dilip Gaonkar (see "Critique" below).
- The early 1970s Speech Communication Conference ("Wingspread conference") gave recognition to the fact that rhetoric, in its globalization (multidisciplinary nature), has become a universal hermeneutic (Gross Rhetorical 2–5). Much scholastic output evolved concerning the theory of interpretation (hermeneutics), the knowledge-making and truth-seeking (epistemic) potential of rhetoric of science.
- Argument Fields (part of the Speech Communication Association and American forensic Association program): In this domain the work of Toulmin on argument appeals is exemplary. In addition, Michael Mulkay, Barry Barnes and David Bloor, as pioneers of the "Sociology of Scientific Knowledge" (SSK) movement, fostered a growing sociobiology debate. Others as Greg Myers expressed the benefits of a collaboration between rhetoricians and sociologists. Contributors to discussion pertaining to audience – the way arguments change as they move from the scientific community to the public – include John Lyne and Henry Howe.
- Scientific Giants: The important works that investigate the suasive powers of exemplars in science include those of Alan G. Gross (Newton, Descartes, argument fields in optics), John Angus Campbell (Darwin), and Michael Halloran (Watson and Crick). J. C. Maxwell introduced differentiable vector fields E and B to express Michael Faraday's findings about an electric field E and a magnetic field B. Thomas K. Simpson has described his rhetorical methods, first with a guided study, then a literary appreciation of A Treatise on Electricity and Magnetism (1873), and with a book attending to the mathematical rhetoric.

Other major themes in rhetoric of science include the investigation of the accomplishments and suasive abilities of individuals (ethos) who have become influential in their respective sciences as well as an age old concern of rhetoric of science – public science policy. Science policy involves deliberative issues, and the first rhetorical study of science policy was made in 1953 by Richard M. Weaver. Among others, Helen Longino's work on public policy implications of low-level radiation continues this tradition.

The reconstitution of rhetorical theory around the lines of invention (inventio), argumentation and stylistic adaptation is occurring currently (Simons 6). The major question is whether training in rhetoric can in fact help scholars and investigators make intelligent choices between rival theories, methods or data collection, and incommensurate values (Simons 14).

Rhetoric of science is also an important theoretical body for rhetoric and composition studies in higher education. This body of work examines how to best prepare communicators for participation with science, such as in the work of Michael Zerbe, Carl Herndl, and Caroline Gottschalk Druschke. Through rhetorical historiography Madison Jones seeks to unearth the influence of other disciplines, such as ecology, on the ways contemporary rhetoricians theorize and define rhetorical inquiry. Interdisciplinary and transdisciplinary collaboration in science also complicates rhetoric and composition pedagogy and provides a new emphasis on collaborative writing across scientific disciplines and with community groups and stakeholds.

== Developments and trends ==
=== Epistemic rhetoric ===
Considering science fin terms of texts exhibiting epistemology based on prediction and control offers new comprehensive ways to consider the function of rhetoric of science (Gross "The Origin" 91–92). Epistemic rhetoric of science, in a broader context, confronts issues pertaining to truth, relativism, and knowledge.

Rhetoric of science, as a type of inquiry, does not consider natural science texts as a means of conveying knowledge, but rather it considers these texts as exhibiting persuasive structures. Although the natural sciences and humanities differ in a fundamental manner, the enterprise of science can be considered hermeneutically as a stream of texts which exhibit an epistemology based on understanding (Gross "On the Shoulders 21). Its task then is the rhetorical reconstruction of the means by which scientists convince themselves and others that their knowledge claims and assertions are an integral part of privileged activity of the community of thinkers with which they are allied (Gross "The Origin" 91).

In an article titled "On Viewing Rhetoric as Epistemic" (1967), Robert L. Scott offers "that truth can arise only from cooperative critical inquiry" (Harris "Knowing" 164). Scott's probe of the issues of belief, knowledge and argumentation substantiates that rhetoric is epistemic. This train of thought goes back to Gorgias who noted that truth is a product of discourse, not a substance added to it (Harris "Knowing" 164).

Scientific discourse is built on accountability of empirical fact which is presented to a scientific community. Each form of communication is a type of genre that fosters human interaction and relations. An example is the emerging form of the experimental report (Bazerman "Reporting" 171–176). The suite of genres to which the rhetoric of science comes to bear on health care and scientific communities is legion.

Aristotle could never accept the unavailability of certain knowledge, although most now believe the contrary (Gross "On Shoulders" 20). That is to say, Aristotle would have rejected the main concern of rhetoric of science: knowledge. Knowing itself generates the explanation of knowing, and this is the domain of the theory of knowledge. The knowledge of knowledge compels an attitude of vigilance against the temptation of certainty (Maturana 239–245).

The claim of the epistemic problematic of rhetoric of science concerns:

- truth - property of statements with respect to other statements
- knowledge - configuration of mutually supporting true statements
- arguments - are situational (first principle of rhetoric)

(Harris "Knowing" 180–181).

=== Argument fields ===
By the 1980s, Stephen Toulmin's work on argument fields published in his book titled The Uses of Argument (1958) came to prominence through rhetorical societies such as the Speech Communication Association which adopted a sociological consideration of science. Toulmin's main contribution is his notion of argument fields that included a reinvention of the rhetorical concept topoi (topics).

Toulmin discusses at length the pattern of an argument – data and warrants to support a claim – and how they tend to vary across argument fields (Toulmin 1417–1422). He delineated two concepts of argumentation, one which relied on universal (field-invariant) appeals and strategies, and one which was field dependent, particular to disciplines, movements, and the like. For Toulmin, audience is important because one speaks to a particular audience at a particular point in time, and thus an argument must be relevant to that audience. In this instance, Toulmin echoes Feyerabend, who in his preoccupation with suasive processes, makes clear the adaptive nature of persuasion.

Toulmin's ideas pertaining to argument were a radical import to argumentation theory because, in part, he contributes a model, and because he contributes greatly to rhetoric and its subfield, rhetoric of science, by providing a model of analysis (data, warrants) to show that what is argued on a subject is in effect a structured arrangement of values that are purposive and lead to a certain line of thought.

Toulmin showed in Human Understanding that the arguments that would support claims as different as the Copernican revolution and the Ptolemaic revolution would not require mediation. On the strength of argument, men of the sixteenth and seventeenth centuries converted to Copernican astronomy (Gross "The Rhetoric" 214).

=== Incommensurability ===
The rhetorical challenge presently is to find discourse that crosses disciplines without sacrificing the specifics of each discipline. The objective is to render description of these disciplines intact – that is to say, the goal of finding language that would make various scientific topics "commensurable". In contrast, incommensurability is a situation where two scientific programs are fundamentally at odds. Two important authors who applied incommensurability to historical and philosophical notions of science during the 1960s are Thomas Kuhn and Paul Feyerabend. Various strands grew out of this idea that bear on issues of communication and invention. These strands are explicated in Randy Allen Harris's four-part taxonomy that in turn emphasizes his viewpoint that "incommensurability is best understood not as a relation between systems, but as a matter of rhetorical invention and hermeneutics" (Harris "Incommensurability" 1).

Incommensurability of theory at times of radical theory change is the basis of Thomas Samuel Kuhn's theory of paradigms (Bazerman 1). Kuhn's Structure of Scientific Revolutions offers a vision of scientific change that involves persuasion, and thus he brought rhetoric to the heart of scientific studies.

Kuhn's Structure provides important accounts related to the concept representation, and the key conceptual changes that occur during a revolution in science. Kuhn sought to determine ways of representing concepts and taxonomies by frames. Kuhn's work attempts to show that incommensurable paradigms can be rationally compared by revealing the compatibility of attribute lists of say a species outlined in a pre-Darwinian and a post-Darwinian milieu accounted for in two incommensurable taxonomies, and that this compatibility is the platform for rational comparison between rival taxonomies. With a view to comparing normal science to revolutionary science, Kuhn illustrates his theory of paradigms and theory of concepts within the history of electricity, chemistry and other disciplines. He gives attention to the revolutionary changes that came about as a result of the work of Nicolaus Copernicus, Isaac Newton, Albert Einstein, Wilhelm Röntgen, and Antoine Lavoisier.

Some scholars, like Thomas C. Walker, feel that Kuhn's theory of paradigms implies knowledge that is "gained in small, incremental, and almost unremarkable installments." Walker states that while "normal science is narrow, rigid, esoteric, uncritical, and conservative, Kuhn considers it to be the most efficient way to ensure a cumulation of knowledge." According to Walker, while "ignorance and intolerance toward other theoretical frameworks are regrettable features of Kuhn's normal science...meaningful conversations can only occur within a single paradigm."

Kuhn's work was influential for rhetoricians, sociologists, and historians (and, in a lesser manner, philosophers) for the development of a rhetorical perspective. His opinion concerning perception, concept acquisition and language suggest, according to Paul Hoyningen-Huene's analysis of Kuhn's philosophy, a cognitive perspective.

=== Ethos ===
Scientists are not just persuaded by logos or argument. Innovative initiatives in science test scientific authority by invoking the authority of past results (initial section of a scientific paper) and the authority of procedure, which establish the scientist's credibility as an investigator (Gross Starring 26–27).

Examinations of the ethos of scientists (individually and collectively) spawned significant contributions in the topic of rhetoric of science. Michael Halloran notes in "The Birth of Molecular Biology" (Rhetoric Review 3, 1984) – an essay that is a rhetorical analysis of James D. Watson and Francis H. Crick's "A Structure for Deoxyribose Nucleic Acid" – that a large part of what constitutes a scientific paradigm is the ethos of its practitioners. This ethos is about an attitude and a way of attacking problems and propagating claims.

In "The Rhetorical Construction of Scientific Ethos," Lawrence Prelli provides a systematic analysis of ethos as a tool of scientific legitimation. Prelli's work examines the exchange of information in the court of public opinion. His work provides insight into the ways in which scientific argumentation is legitimized, and thus insight into public science policy. One of the domains of rhetoric is civic life. Rhetorical criticism of science offers much in the investigation of scientific matters that impinge directly upon public opinion and policy-making decisions.

=== Rhetoric and language-games ===
Rhetoric can also be defined as the strategic use of language: each scientist tries to make those statements that - given the statements made by their colleagues, and the ones the former expects they will do in the future (e.g., accepting or rejecting the claims made by the former) - maximise the chances of the former's attaining the goals he or she has. So, game theory can be applied to study the choice of the claims one scientist makes. Zamora Bonilla argues that, when rhetoric is understood this way, it can be discussed whether the way scientists interact - e.g., through certain scientific institutions like peer review - causes them to make their claims in an efficient or an inefficient way, that is, whether the 'rhetorical games' are more analogous to invisible hand processes, or to prisoner's dilemma games. If the former is the case, then we can assert that scientific 'conversation' is organised in such a manner that the strategic use of language by scientists causes them to attain cognitive progress, and if the opposite is the case, then this would be an argument to reform scientific institutions.

=== Rhetorical figures in science ===
Corresponding to distinct lines of reasoning, figures of speech are evident in scientific arguments. The same cognitive and verbal skills that are of service to one line of inquiry – political, economic or popular – are of service to science (Fahnestock 43). This implies that there is less of a division between science and the humanities than anticipated initially. Argumentatively useful figures of speech are found everywhere in scientific writing.

Theodosius Dobzhansky in Genetics and the Origin of Species offers a means of reconciliation between Mendelian mutation and Darwinian natural selection. By remaining sensitive to the interests of naturalists and geneticists, Dobzhansky – through a subtle strategy of polysemy – allowed a peaceful solution to a battle between two scientific territories. His expressed objective was to review the genetic information bearing on the problem of organic diversity. The building blocks of Dobzhansky's interdisciplinary influence that included much development in two scientific camps were the result of the compositional choices he made. He uses, for instance, prolepsis to make arguments that introduced his research findings, and he provided a metaphoric map as a means to guide his audience. One illustration of metaphor is his use of the term "adaptive landscapes". Considered metaphorically, this term is a way of representing how theorists of two different topics can unite.

Another figure that is important as an aid to understanding and knowledge is antimetabole (refutation by reversal). Antithesis also works toward a similar end.

An example of antimetabole:

- Antimetabole often appears in writing or visuals where the line of inquiry and experiment has been characterized by mirror-image objects, or of complementarity, reversible or equilibrium processes. Louis Pasteur's revelation that many organic compounds come in left-and right-handed versions or isomers as articulated at an 1883 lecture illustrates the use of this figure. He argues in lecture that "life is the germ and the germ is life" because all life contains unsymmetrical/asymmetrical processes (Fahnestock 137–140).

=== New Materialist Rhetoric of Science ===
A more recent trend in rhetorical studies involves participation with the broader new materialist ideas concerning philosophy and science and technology studies. This new topic of inquiry investigates the role of rhetoric and discourse as an integral part of the Materialism of scientific practice. This method considers how the methods of natural sciences came into being, and the particular role interaction among scientists and scientific institutions has to play. New materialist rhetoric of science include those proponents who consider the progress of the natural sciences as having been obtained at a high cost, a cost that limits the scope and vision of science. Work in this area often draws on scholarship by Bruno Latour, Steve Woolgar, Annemarie Mol, and other new materialist scholars from science and technology studies. Work in new materialist rhetoric of science tends to be very critical of a perceived over-reliance on language in more conservative variants of rhetoric of science and has significantly criticized long-standing areas of inquiry such as incommensurability studies.

=== Critique of rhetoric of science ===
==== Globalization of rhetoric ====
Renewed interest today in rhetoric of science is its positioning as a hermeneutic meta-discourse rather than a substantive discourse practice. Exegesis and hermeneutics are the tools around which the idea of scientific production has been forged.

Criticism of rhetoric of science is mainly limited to discussions of the concept of hermeneutics, which can be considered as follows:

- Rhetorical hermeneutics is about a way of reading texts as rhetoric. Rhetoric is both a discipline and a perspective from which disciplines can be viewed. As a discipline, it has a hermeneutic task and generates knowledge; as a perspective, it has the task of generating new points of view (Gross Rhetorical 111). Whether rhetorical theory can function as a general hermeneutic, a key to all texts, including scientific texts, is still today a point of interest to rhetoricians. Although natural sciences and humanities differ in fundamental ways, science as enterprise can be viewed hermeneutically as a suite of texts exhibiting a study of knowledge (epistemology) based on understanding (Gross "On Shoulders" 21).

A recent critique about the rhetoric of science literature asks not if science is understood properly, but rather if rhetoric is understood properly. This dissension concerns the reading of scientific texts rhetorically; it is a quarrel about how rhetorical theory is considered as a global hermeneutic (Gross "Intro" Rhetorical 1–13).

Dilip Gaonkar in "The Idea of Rhetoric in the Rhetoric of Science" examines how critics argue about rhetoric, and he unfolds the global ambitions of rhetorical theory as a general hermeneutic (a master key to all texts), with the rhetoric of science as a perfect site of analysis - a hard and fast case.

In his analysis of this 'case', Gaonkar looks at rhetoric's essential character first in traditional sense (Aristotilean and Ciceronian). Then he examined at the practice of rhetoric and the model of persuasive speech from the point of agency (productive orientation) or who controls the speech (means of communication). The rhetorical tradition is one of practice, while the theory evinces practice and teaching (Gross "Intro" Rhetorical 6–11). Gaonkar asserts that rhetoric considered as a tradition (Aristotilean and Ciceronia), and from the point of view of interpretation (not production or agency), rhetorical theory is "thin." He argues that rhetoric appears as a slightly disguised language of criticism in such a way that it is applicable to almost any discourse.

Gaonkar believes that this type of globalization of rhetoric undermines rhetoric's self-representation as a situated practical art, and in so doing, it runs counter to a humanist tradition. It runs counter to the interpretative function of a critical metadiscourse. If there is no more substance, no anchor, no reference to which rhetoric is attached, rhetoric itself is the substance, or the supplement, and thus becomes substantial, giving rise to the question how well rhetoric functions as interpretative discourse.

Dilip Gaonkar's provocations have begun a broad reaching discussion that resulted in the defense of rhetoric analyses of scientific discourse. Responses to Gaonkar's provocations are many, of which two examples follow.

- When Gaonkar asks if a theory grounded in practice can be translated into a theory of interpretation, Michael Leff in "The Idea of Rhetoric as Interpretative Practice: A Humanist's Response to Gaonkar" see his views as too extreme, treating as opposites two positions that are in dialectic tension (rhetoric as production and rhetoric as interpretation), and separating interpretation from practice in order to establish a causal, rather than accidental, relationship between rhetoric and the globalalization of rhetoric (Gross "Intro" Rhetorical 11).
- John Angus Campbell in "Strategic Readings: Rhetoric, Intention, and Interpretation" also found in Rhetorical Hermeneutics is a verification of Leff's analysis (113). He argues, however, against Gaonkar's notion of invention and the mediation between producer or writer and the audience of a text(114). The differences between Campbell and Gaonkar is one of theory, and not whether agency figures in criticism (115).

==== New Materialist Rhetoric of Science ====
The new materialist method of rhetoric of science has endorsed Goankar's criticisms of rhetoric of science more generally and seeks to overcome them through interdisciplinary engagement with science and technology studies. However, the new materialist approach, itself, has been subjected to significant criticism within the field, and identified as a radical variant. The question as to the adequacy of rhetoric in its encounter with scientific texts (natural sciences) is problematic for two reasons. The first concerns traditional rhetoric and its capacity to analyze scientific texts. Secondly, the answer to the question relies on an attack of the epistomological presuppositions of a classical rhetoric of science. For this reason, the radical critique is a demand for the renewal of rhetorical theory.

== See also ==
- Contingency
- Demarcation problem
- Epistemology
- Falsifiability
- Rhetoric of health and medicine

== Works cited ==
- Bazerman, Charles and René Agustin De los Santos. "Measuring Incommensurability: Are toxicology and ecotoxicology blind to what the other sees?" 9 January 2006. .
- Bazerman, Charles. "Reporting the Experiment: The Changing Account of Scientific Doings in the Philosophical Transactions of the Royal Society, 1665-1800." In Landmark Essays on Rhetoric of Science: Case Studies. Ed. Randy Allen Harris. Mahwah: Hermagoras Press, 1997.
- Booth, Wayne C. The Rhetoric of Rhetoric: The Quest for Effective Communication. Malden: Blackwell Publishing, 2004.
- Campbell, John Angus. "Scientific Discovery and Rhetorical Invention." In The Rhetorical Turn: Inventions and Persuasion in the Conduct of Inquiry. Ed. Herbert W. Simons. Chicago: The University of Chicago Press, 1990.
- Dawkins, Richard. The Selfish Gene. Oxford: Oxford UP, 1989.
- Fahnestock, Jeanne. Rhetorical Figures in Science. New York: Oxford UP, 1999.
- Feyerabend, Paul. Against Method: Outline of an Anarchistic Theory of Knowledge. London: Verso, 1975.
- Gross, Alan G. "On the Shoulders of Giants: Seventeenth-Century Optics as an Argument Field." In Landmark Essays on Rhetoric of Science: Case Studies. Ed. Randy Allen Harris. Mahwah: Hermagoras Press, 1997.
- Gross, Alan G., Starring The Text: The Place of Rhetoric in Science Studies. Carbondale: Southern Illinois UP, 2006.
- Gross, Alan G. "The Origin of Species: Evolutionary Taxonomy as an Example of the Rhetoric of Science". In The Rhetorical Turn: Invention and Persuasion in the Conduct of Inquiry. Ed. Herbert W. Simons. Chicago: The University of Chicago Press, 1990.
- Gross A., and William M. Keith. Eds. "Introduction." Rhetorical Hermeneutics: Invention and Interpretation in the Age of Science. Albany: State University of New York Press, 1997.
- Harris, Randy Allen. "Knowing, Rhetoric, Science." In Visions and Revisions: Continuity and Change in Rhetoric and Composition. Ed. James D. Williams. Carbondale: Southern Illinois UP, 2002.
- Jasinski, James. "Introduction." Sourcebook on Rhetoric: Key Concepts in Contemporary Rhetorical Studies. Thousand Oaks: Sage Publications, 2001.
- Kuhn, Thomas S. The Structure of Scientific Revolutions. 3rd ed. Chicago: University of Chicago Press, 1996.
- Maturana, Humberto R., and Varela, Francisco J. The Tree of Knowledge: The Biological Roots of Human Understanding. Boston: Shambhala Publications, Inc., 1987.
- Toulmin, S. "The Uses of Argument." In The Rhetorical Tradition: Readings from Classical Times to the Present. 2nd ed. Eds. Bizzell, Patricia and Bruce Herzberg. Boston: Bedford, 1990.
