= Alan G. Gross =

American academic (1936–2020)

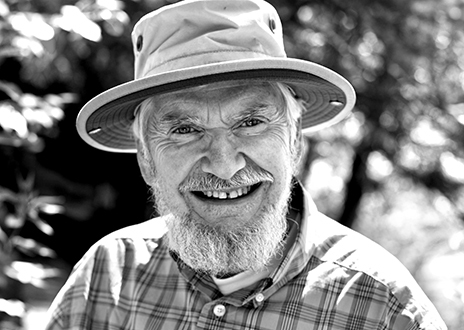
- Gross, photographed in 2009
- Born: June 2, 1936; New York City, New York, U.S.
- Died: October 16, 2020 (aged 84); Minneapolis, Minnesota, U.S.
- Education: Princeton University
- Children: 3
- Scientific career
- Fields: Rhetoric; Rhetoric of science; Communication studies
- Workplaces: University of Minnesota; Purdue University Northwest; Macomb Community College; Wayne State University

Alan G. Gross (June 2, 1936 - October 16, 2020) was an American professor of rhetoric and Communication Studies at the University of Minnesota, Twin Cities where he also held appointments in the Center for Philosophy of Science, and in the rhetoric, scientific, and technical communication graduate program, the latter of which he was a founding faculty member.

Gross was a prolific author of dozens of articles, and author, co-author, or editor of more than a dozen books in rhetorical theory, rhetorical criticism, and the rhetoric of science, perhaps the most well-known being The Rhetoric of Science (Harvard University Press, 1990 and 1996) which was reviewed by the historian and philosopher of science Joseph Agassi.

In 2008, Gross and co-author Joseph Harmon won Best Book in Technical or Scientific Communication from NCTE for The Scientific Literature: A Guided Tour. In 2014, he was named Distinguished Scholar by the National Communication Association, their highest honor.

An internationally recognized scholar, Gross held appointments at Australian National University; at the Centre for Rhetoric Studies, Cape Town; at the Internationales Forschungszentrum Kulturwissenschaften, Vienna; and at the Institute for Advanced Study, Hebrew University, Jerusalem.

A video of Gross discussing his scholarship and research, and the development of the Rhetoric of Science as a field, was produced by the Association for the Rhetoric of Science and Technology and can be found online.

Gross received his Ph.D. in 1962 from Princeton University.

== Selected books ==
- The Rhetoric of Science, Harvard University Press, 1990 and 1996.
- Rhetorical Hermeneutics: Invention and Interpretation in the Age of Science, co-editor William M. Keith, State University of New York Press, 1997.
- Rereading Aristotle's Rhetoric, (co-editor Arthur E. Walzer) Southern Illinois University Press, 2000.
- Chaim Perelman, co-author Ray D. Dearin, State University of New York Press, 2003.
- Communicating Science: The Scientific Article from the 17th Century to the Present, co-authors Joseph E. Harmon, Michael Reidy, Oxford University Press, 2002.
- Starring the Text: The Place of Rhetoric in Science Studies, Southern Illinois University Press, 2006.
- The Scientific Literature: A Guided Tour, co-editor Joseph E. Harmon, University of Chicago Press, 2007.
- The Craft of Scientific Communication, co-author Joseph E. Harmon, University of Chicago Press, 2010.
- Science from Sight to Insight: How Scientists Illustrate Meaning, co-author Joseph E. Harmon, University of Chicago Press, 2014.
- The Internet Revolution in the Sciences and Humanities, co-author Joseph E. Harmon, Oxford University Press, 2016.
- The Scientific Sublime: Popular Science Unravels the Mysteries of the Universe, Oxford University Press, 2018.

== See also ==
- Rhetoric of science
